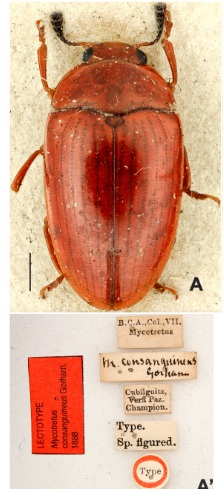

Scientific classification
- Kingdom: Animalia
- Phylum: Arthropoda
- Class: Insecta
- Order: Coleoptera
- Suborder: Polyphaga
- Infraorder: Cucujiformia
- Family: Erotylidae
- Genus: Mycotretus
- Species: M. consanguineus

Binomial name
- Mycotretus consanguineus Gorham, 1888

= Mycotretus consanguineus =

Species of beetle

Mycotretus consanguineus is a species of beetle of the Erotylidae family. This species is found in Guatemala and Panama.
