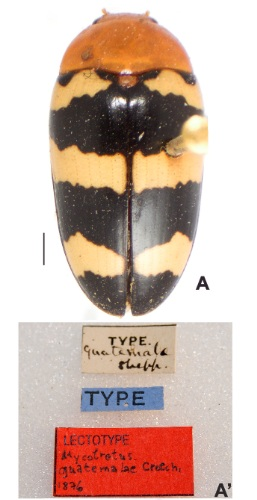

Scientific classification
- Kingdom: Animalia
- Phylum: Arthropoda
- Clade: Pancrustacea
- Class: Insecta
- Order: Coleoptera
- Suborder: Polyphaga
- Infraorder: Cucujiformia
- Family: Erotylidae
- Genus: Mycotretus
- Species: M. guatemalae

Binomial name
- Mycotretus guatemalae Crotch, 1876

= Mycotretus guatemalae =

Species of beetle

Mycotretus guatemalae is a species of beetle of the Erotylidae family. This species is found in Guatemala, El Salvador and Venezuela.
