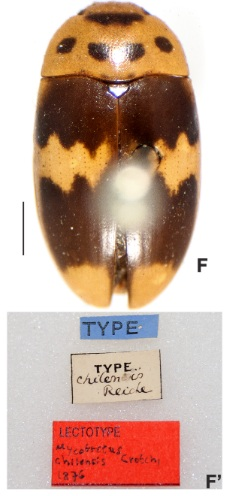

Scientific classification
- Kingdom: Animalia
- Phylum: Arthropoda
- Clade: Pancrustacea
- Class: Insecta
- Order: Coleoptera
- Suborder: Polyphaga
- Infraorder: Cucujiformia
- Family: Erotylidae
- Genus: Mycotretus
- Species: M. chilensis

Binomial name
- Mycotretus chilensis Crotch, 1876

Synonyms
- Mycotretus bicinctus Guérin, 1949a

= Mycotretus chilensis =

Species of beetle

Mycotretus chilensis is a species of beetle of the Erotylidae family. This species is found in southern and southeastern Brazil. The type locality is Chile, but the type specimen is possibly mislabelled. Records from Chile are therefore doubtful.
