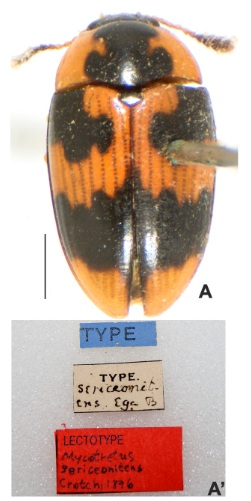

Scientific classification
- Kingdom: Animalia
- Phylum: Arthropoda
- Clade: Pancrustacea
- Class: Insecta
- Order: Coleoptera
- Suborder: Polyphaga
- Infraorder: Cucujiformia
- Family: Erotylidae
- Genus: Mycotretus
- Species: M. sericeonitens

Binomial name
- Mycotretus sericeonitens Crotch, 1876

= Mycotretus sericeonitens =

Species of beetle

Mycotretus sericeonitens is a species of beetle of the Erotylidae family. This species is found in Ecuador, Peru, Bolivia and northern Brazil.

== Subspecies ==
- Mycotretus sericeonitens sericeonitens (Ecuador, Peru, Bolivia, North Brazil)
- Mycotretus sericeonitens monticola Crotch, 1876 (Ecuador)
