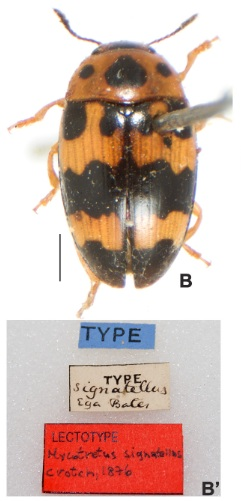

Scientific classification
- Kingdom: Animalia
- Phylum: Arthropoda
- Clade: Pancrustacea
- Class: Insecta
- Order: Coleoptera
- Suborder: Polyphaga
- Infraorder: Cucujiformia
- Family: Erotylidae
- Genus: Mycotretus
- Species: M. signatellus

Binomial name
- Mycotretus signatellus Crotch, 1876

Synonyms
- Mycotretus signatellus imperfectus Crotch, 1876; Mycotretus fragosoi Alvarenga, 1983

= Mycotretus signatellus =

Species of beetle

Mycotretus signatellus is a species of beetle of the Erotylidae family. This species is found in northern Brazil.
