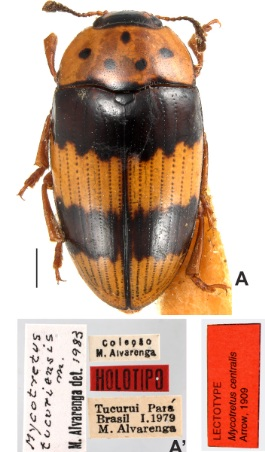

Scientific classification
- Kingdom: Animalia
- Phylum: Arthropoda
- Clade: Pancrustacea
- Class: Insecta
- Order: Coleoptera
- Suborder: Polyphaga
- Infraorder: Cucujiformia
- Family: Erotylidae
- Genus: Mycotretus
- Species: M. tucuruiensis

Binomial name
- Mycotretus tucuruiensis Alvarenga, 1983

= Mycotretus tucuruiensis =

Species of beetle

Mycotretus tucuruiensis is a species of beetle of the Erotylidae family. This species is found in northern Brazil.

In addition, there is collection material of this species from Peru.
