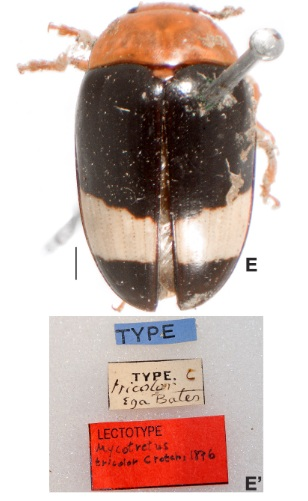

Scientific classification
- Kingdom: Animalia
- Phylum: Arthropoda
- Clade: Pancrustacea
- Class: Insecta
- Order: Coleoptera
- Suborder: Polyphaga
- Infraorder: Cucujiformia
- Family: Erotylidae
- Genus: Mycotretus
- Species: M. tricolor

Binomial name
- Mycotretus tricolor Crotch, 1876

= Mycotretus tricolor =

Species of beetle

Mycotretus tricolor is a species of beetle of the Erotylidae family. This species is found in Peru and northern Brazil.
