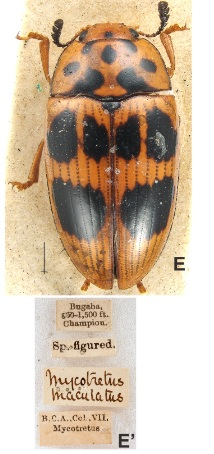

Scientific classification
- Kingdom: Animalia
- Phylum: Arthropoda
- Clade: Pancrustacea
- Class: Insecta
- Order: Coleoptera
- Suborder: Polyphaga
- Infraorder: Cucujiformia
- Family: Erotylidae
- Genus: Mycotretus
- Species: M. maculatus

Binomial name
- Mycotretus maculatus (Olivier, 1792)

Synonyms
- Erotylus maculatus Olivier, 1792; Mycotretus figuratus Lacordaire, 1842; Mycotretus mutabilis Crotch, 1876

= Mycotretus maculatus =

Species of beetle

Mycotretus maculatus is a species of beetle of the Erotylidae family. This species is found in the Neotropical region.
