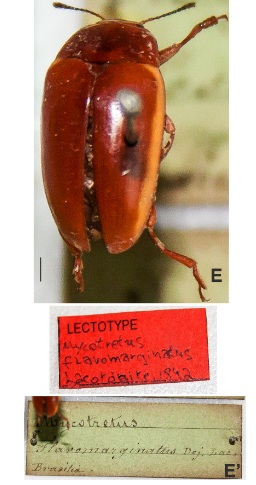

Scientific classification
- Kingdom: Animalia
- Phylum: Arthropoda
- Clade: Pancrustacea
- Class: Insecta
- Order: Coleoptera
- Suborder: Polyphaga
- Infraorder: Cucujiformia
- Family: Erotylidae
- Genus: Mycotretus
- Species: M. flavomarginatus

Binomial name
- Mycotretus flavomarginatus Lacordaire, 1842

Synonyms
- Mycotretus major Mader, 1955

= Mycotretus flavomarginatus =

Species of beetle

Mycotretus flavomarginatus is a species of beetle of the Erotylidae family. This species is found in Paraguay and southeastern Brazil.
