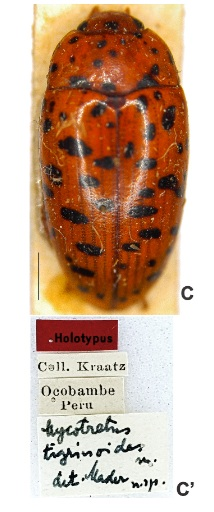

Scientific classification
- Kingdom: Animalia
- Phylum: Arthropoda
- Class: Insecta
- Order: Coleoptera
- Suborder: Polyphaga
- Infraorder: Cucujiformia
- Family: Erotylidae
- Genus: Mycotretus
- Species: M. tigrinoides

Binomial name
- Mycotretus tigrinoides Mader, 1942

= Mycotretus tigrinoides =

Species of beetle

Mycotretus tigrinoides is a species of beetle of the Erotylidae family. This species is found in Peru, northern and central-western Brazil.
