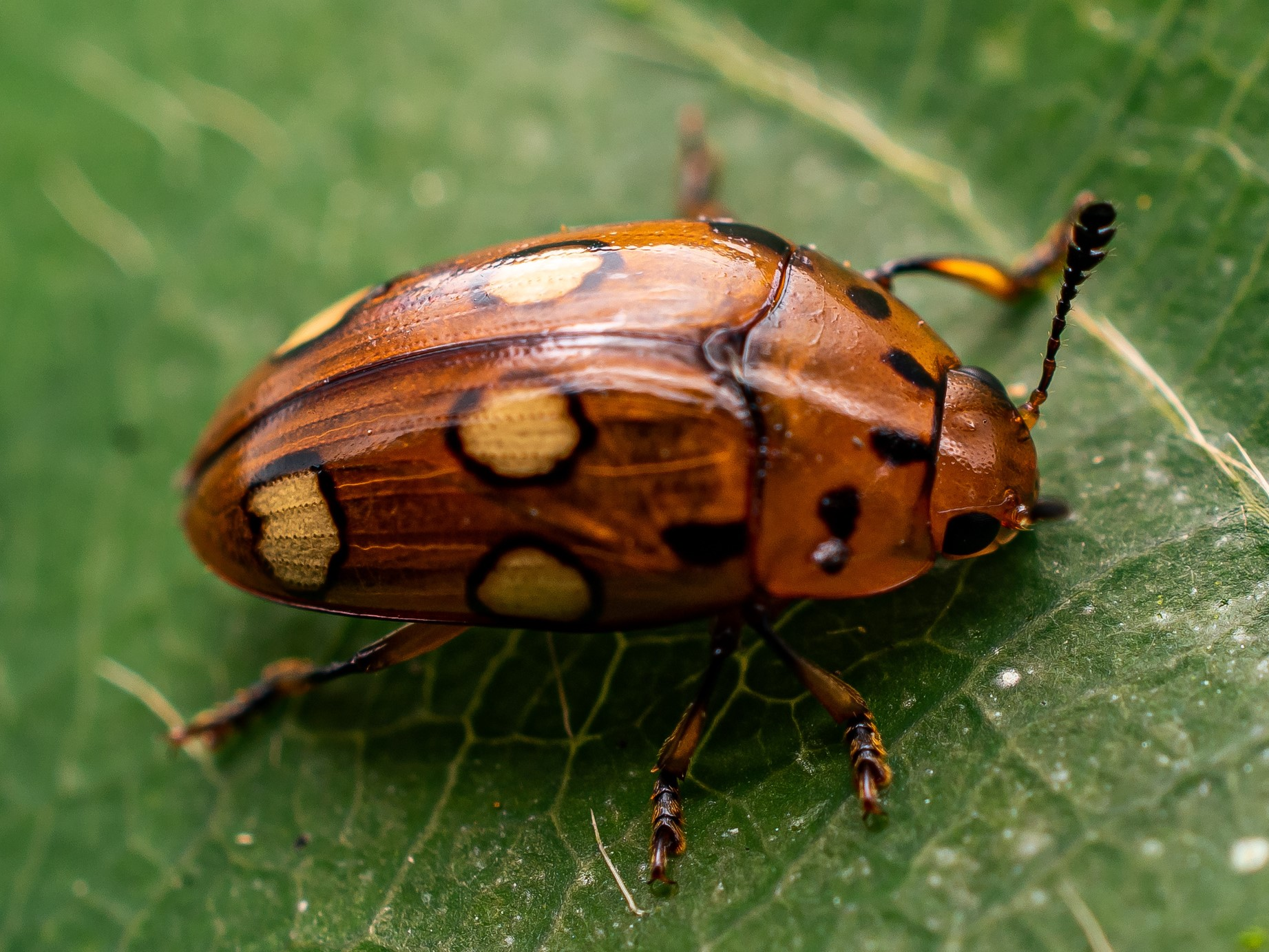
- Adult Mycotretus sexoculatus, São Bernardo do Campo, Brazil

Scientific classification
- Kingdom: Animalia
- Phylum: Arthropoda
- Clade: Pancrustacea
- Class: Insecta
- Order: Coleoptera
- Suborder: Polyphaga
- Infraorder: Cucujiformia
- Family: Erotylidae
- Tribe: Tritomini
- Genus: Mycotretus; Lacordaire, 1842

Type species
- Erotylus lesueuri Lacordaire, 1842

Synonyms
- Lybas Dejean, 1836 ("1837"; unavailable); Mycotretus Chevrolat, 1837 (lapsus); Mycotretus Dejean, 1836 ("1837"; unavailable)

= Mycotretus =

Genus of beetles

Mycotretus is a large American genus in the pleasing fungus beetle family (Erotylidae). They are small, oval beetles, and often very colorful and boldly patterned in yellowish, orange-red to chestnut-brown, and black hues; historically, they were popular with insect collectors. Among its family, this genus is placed in subfamily Tritominae, or – in taxonomic arrangements that prefer a more comprehensive subfamily Erotylinae – in tribe Tritomini of the Erotylinae.

These beetles are found throughout the Neotropics except on high mountain ranges. Some isolated records from temperate North America presumably refer to introduced specimens. One species (M.nigromanicatus) ranges as far north as the Chiricahua Mountains of Arizona, USA, while in the south of the genus' range, several species are found in Paraguay and northern Argentina. While some species, such as M.ornatus, M.pygmaeus and M.scitulus, occur almost across the entire range of the genus, many are restricted to a single range of hills or to one area bordered by large rivers, with Mexico and the Amazon Basin having the highest diversity of Mycotretus. Like some of their relatives, they do not eat mainly polypores (shelf fungi) as most pleasing fungus beetles do, but prefer gilled Agaricales fungi; unlike in the close relative Pselaphacus, larvae of Mycotretus species feed individually and do not receive parental care.

This genus has a convoluted nomenclatural history involving the related genera Ischyrus and Lybas. In addition, its delimitation against Mycomystes was long disputed and as of 2023 is still not fully resolved, and it possible that some little-known genera such as Haematochiton turn out to properly belong into Mycotretus. Altogether, Mycotretes seems to form the core of a vast and still little-understood assemblage which in addition to the above also includes such genera as Mycolybas, Neoxestus or Xalpirta.

== Description ==
Mycotretus are small beetles, about 4-10 mm long and 2.5-6 mm wide as adults, and usually only about half that size at most. Their body is elliptical, sometimes with a slightly blunter head, smoothly rounded on all sides, fairly flat-backed, and twice as long as it is wide or slightly longer. They are usually two- to four-colored, in a blackish and one or two orange-yellow to reddish-brown hues, and sometimes some yellowish-white; the exact pattern varies according to species, but typically is spotted or striped.

Head
The head generally seems to lack file-like structures for stridulation, and has no constriction between the rather small compound eyes. The individual ommatidia are also small; this genus is probably diurnal or crepuscular, but generally does not seem to rely on eyesight much. The "cheek" lobes are so little developed as to be invisible in most species; the clypeus has no margin on its smooth front edge. The epistome is unmargined, due to the ocular striae at most barely reaching the antenna insertion points, and ends in an almost straight edge with a slight concave indentation. The antenna length is about two-thirds of the pronotal base width or a bit more, with antenna segment 3 almost as long as the segments 4 and 5 together, and a "clubbed" antenna tip. This is usually formed by the last 4 segments and gradually widens; in some it only consists of 3 segments, with the initial one (segment 9) abruptly wider than the preceding, in some other species the eighth segment is already notably widened. The "club" is rather compact, with its segments often hard to distinguish.

The maxillary palps have an end segment that is rounded and shortened (in some species only one-third as long as it is wide), cup-shapedn, and does not carry a brush; the maxillary lacinia in some species lack teeth at the tip, but the type species M.lesueuri has small curved teeth as found in many other closely related Erotylidae (e.g. Triplax). The labium has a large and rounded or weakly pentagonal mentum with a weakly pointed tip, and palps which end in a comparatively small hatchet-shaped segment with a strong bristle at the outer side and a sharply cut-off tip which bears a tiny brush. The mouth-cavity sides are flattened lobes.

Body, wings and legs
The prothorax is almost as wide at the base as the wings at their widest point. The pronotum is fairly wide and approximately square- to trapezoid-shaped, with the forward edge about the same length as the rear edge or slightly shorter, and the pronotal length somewhat smaller than the forward edge; the sides curve towards the forward end. A thin margin runs all around the pronotum, but may be less well developed on the front edge between the compond eyes, unlike in Haematochiton where the pronotal margin is clearly absent between the eyes. There are no conspicuous pores in the corners of the pronotum. The tip of the prosternum is either compressed into a pitcher-like lip, or vertically evenly rounded; the lengthwise lines at the center margin of the leg attachments extend forward of these a tiny bit or not at all, are strongly engraved, and run almost parallel.

On the mesosternum, the lines between the leg attachments are scarcely visible or entirely absent; on the metasternum they are more clearly engraved. The scutellum is bluntly heart-shaped to pentagonal. The elytra are ornamented with regular lines of small punctuations; they also have a distinct margin at the base, which is very pronounced in some species but fairly weak in others, and does not extend all the way to the tip.

The attachments of each leg pair are neither particularly close or conspicuously far away. The tibiae are not widened towards the ends. The first three segments of the tarsi are increasingly widened, segment 4 of the tarsi is reduced, attached to the upper centerside of segment 3, and rigidly connected to segment 5.

At least in most Mycotretus (but perhaps not in all), the males, but not the females, have a conspicuous roughly punctated spot in the center of the underside of the first abdominal segment. The aedeagus of the male genitalia at least in some species strikingly resembles that of Haematochiton in having a distinctive anterior end of the internal sac, whose main body is long and may even wind around the ejaculatory duct which is also sizeable. On the other hand, the female genitalia are more reminiscent of Triplax species such as T.thoracica, with an eighth tergite which has strongly sclerotized lines along the sides, and in the centerline near the tip a deep but narrow membranous indentation. Nonwithstanding their wide distribution, considerable diversity, and conspicuous appearance, the ecology of these beetles remains almost unknown – and what is known is mostly conjectural – even today. As late as the mid-20th century, no study had been done on their larvae and pupae.

== Nomenclature and taxonomy ==
Mycotretus is one of the largest genera in this family – possibly the second-largest; after its latest revision in 2023, when numerous supposed species were synonymized with others (in particular the highly variable Mycotretus ornatus) or moved to other genera, it still contained almost 170 accepted species.

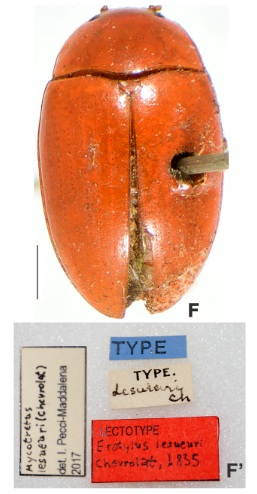
This Mexican specimen of Mycotretus lesueuri, initially named Erotylus leseuri by Chevrolat and placed in Lybas by Dejean, is the name-bearing type of its species, and thus also of the entire genus Mycotretes

The genus names Ischyrus, Lybas and Mycotretus were first published by Pierre Dejean in the second edition of his Catalogue des Coléoptères in 1836; however, he attributed these names to Louis Chevrolat instead of claiming authorship himself. Dejean's catalog was a simple list of names, with no diagostic criteria or descriptions, but as he included well-known species that hat been extensively described by previous authors in each of his genera, his genera are technically valid.

Jean Lacordaire in 1842 published a monograph on the pleasing fungus beetles. Therein, he also used the genus names Ischyrus, Lybas and Mycotretus, attributing them to Chevrolat just as Dejean did. However, Lacordaire placed Dejean's Lybas species in Mycotretus and re-established the genus Lybas for Lybas normalis, a species mentioned by preceding authors such as Dejean, but never validly described until Lacordaire's 1842 work. Meanwhile, most of Dejean's small Mycotretus species were moved into Ischyrus by Lacordaire, where they formed a second "division" (subgenus) distinct from the large tropical species which had already been placed in Ischyrus by Dejean.

In 1873, George Crotch split genus Ischyrus, elevating Lacordaire's groups to full genus status. But he retained the name Ischyrus for the second group, which had been treated as Mycotretus by Dejean. The first group, Dejean's Ischyrus, was named Megischyrus by Crotch. For his remaining Ischyrus, Crotch designated Olivier's Erotylus quadripunctatus as type species. As he only referred back to Lacordaire, Crotch overlooked that Dejean had included this species in Mycotretus, preventing its use as type species of Ischyrus.

However, Crotch failed to designate a type species for Mycotretus. W.W.Boyle attempted to correct this in 1956, and selected the beetle described as Erotylus leseuri by Chevrolat in 1935. But like Crotch with his Ischyrus type species, Boyle did not note that Dejean had included this species in his genus Lybas at the time when he established Mycotretus, making Boyle's type designation invalid.

Subsequent authors applied the genus names as proposed by Crotch and Boyle, until Moacyr Alvarenga in 1965 revalidated Dejean's Ischyrus with E.undatus as type species, making Megischyrus a junior objective synonym and invalidating it. For the second group, containing most of Dejean's Mycotretus, Alvarenga established the genus Micrischyrus, with E.quadripunctatus as type species to exactly replace Crotch's Ischyrus which had become a junior homonym by the abolishment of Megischyrus, and likewise invalidated. However, almost all Erotylidae research at that time was published in English, with Japanese and German having some minor relevance due to prolific experts Michio Chûjô and Kurt Delkeskamp, whereas Alvarenga published in Brazilian Portuguese and his nomenclatural acts appeared in the then little-known zoological bulletin of the Federal University of Paraná (now Acta Biologica Paranaense). Consequently, unaware of Alvarenga's proposed solution to a problem they often were not even aware of in the first place, other erotylid researchers continued to apply Crotch's nomenclature. As for Mycotretus, its authorship was mistakenly referred by Alvarenga to Chevrolat, 1837, with M.ornatus (under its original name Erotylus ornatus) as alleged type species.

To resolve this situation, Paul E. Skelley and Michael A. Goodrich in 1994 petitioned the ICZN to rule Dejean's descriptions as invalid; this would preserve the prevailing genus assignments. In 1996, the ICZN agred to this proposal, establishing Lacordaire as the author of Mycotretus due to Crotch's and Boyle's revalidation of his genus. This also permitted E.leseuri to be type species of Mycotretus, courtesy of Lacordaire having moved it there.

=== Species ===
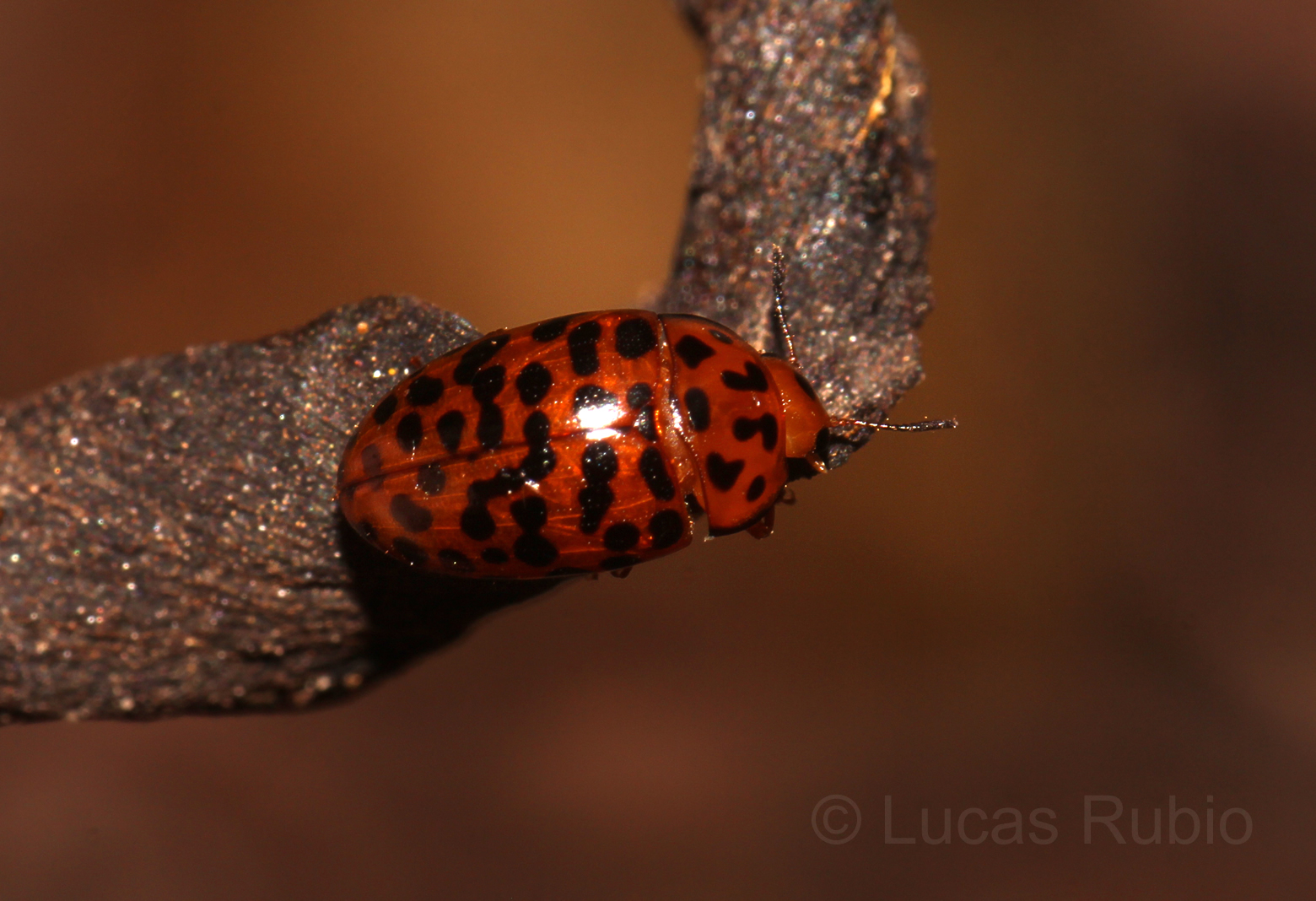
Mycotretus centralis in Santa Rosa de Calamuchita, Argentina

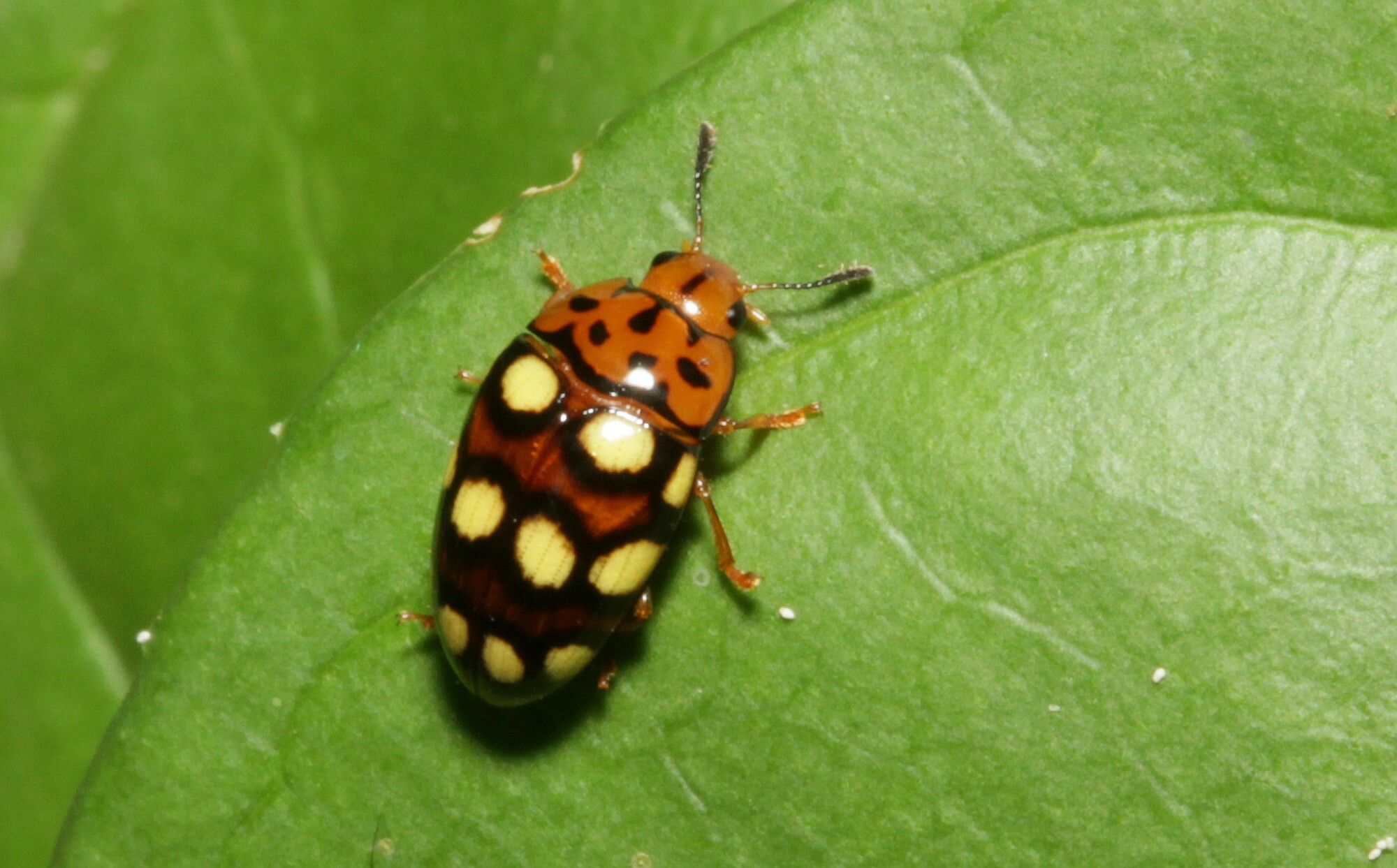
Mycotretus duodecimguttatus in Panguana, Peru

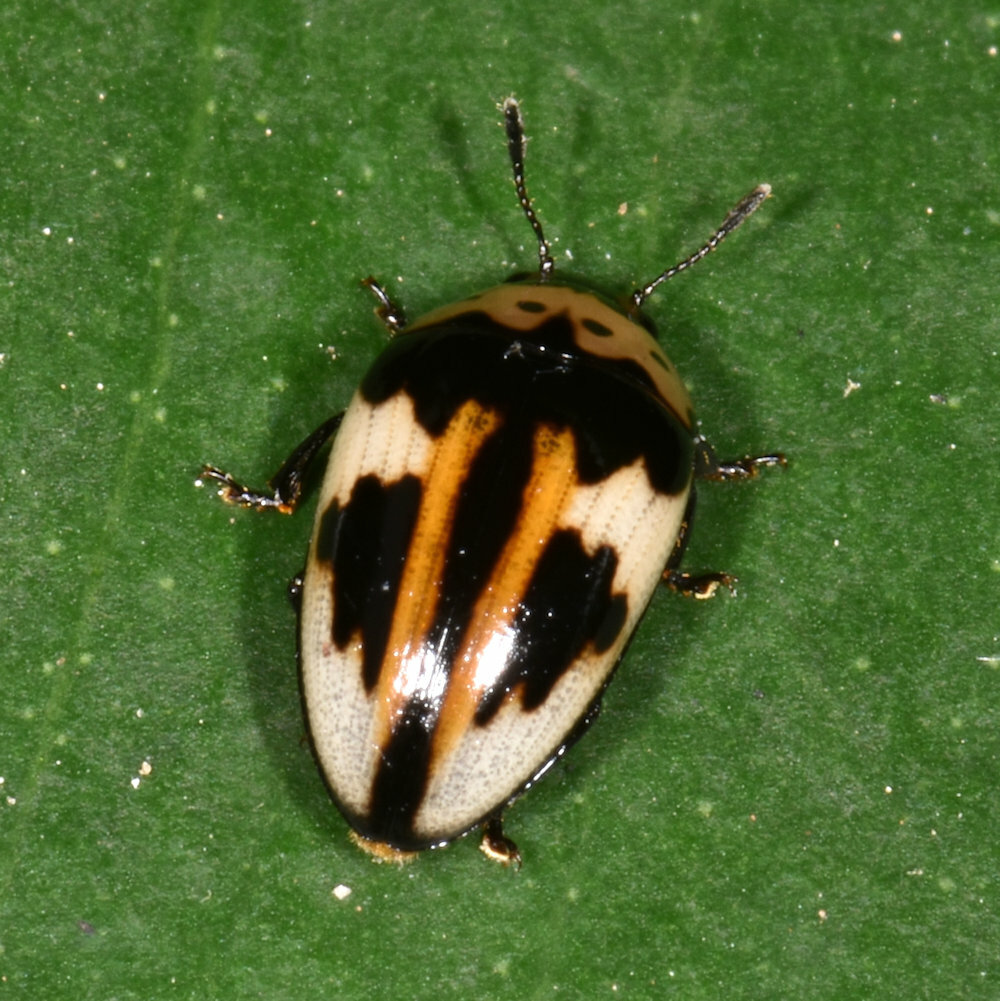
Mycotretus fallax in Iguaçu National Park, Brazil

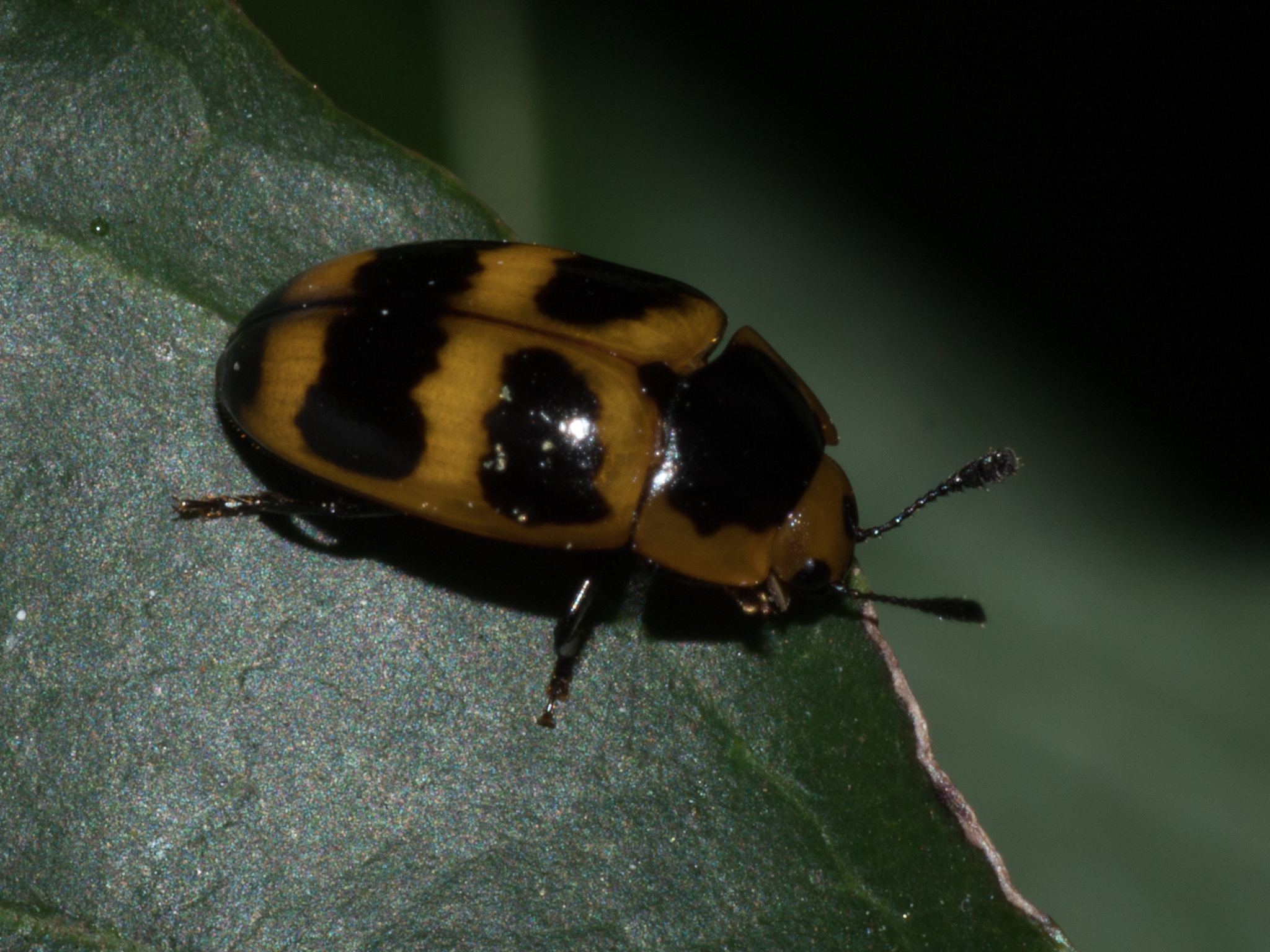
Mycotretus marginicollis in Cruz Alta, Brazil

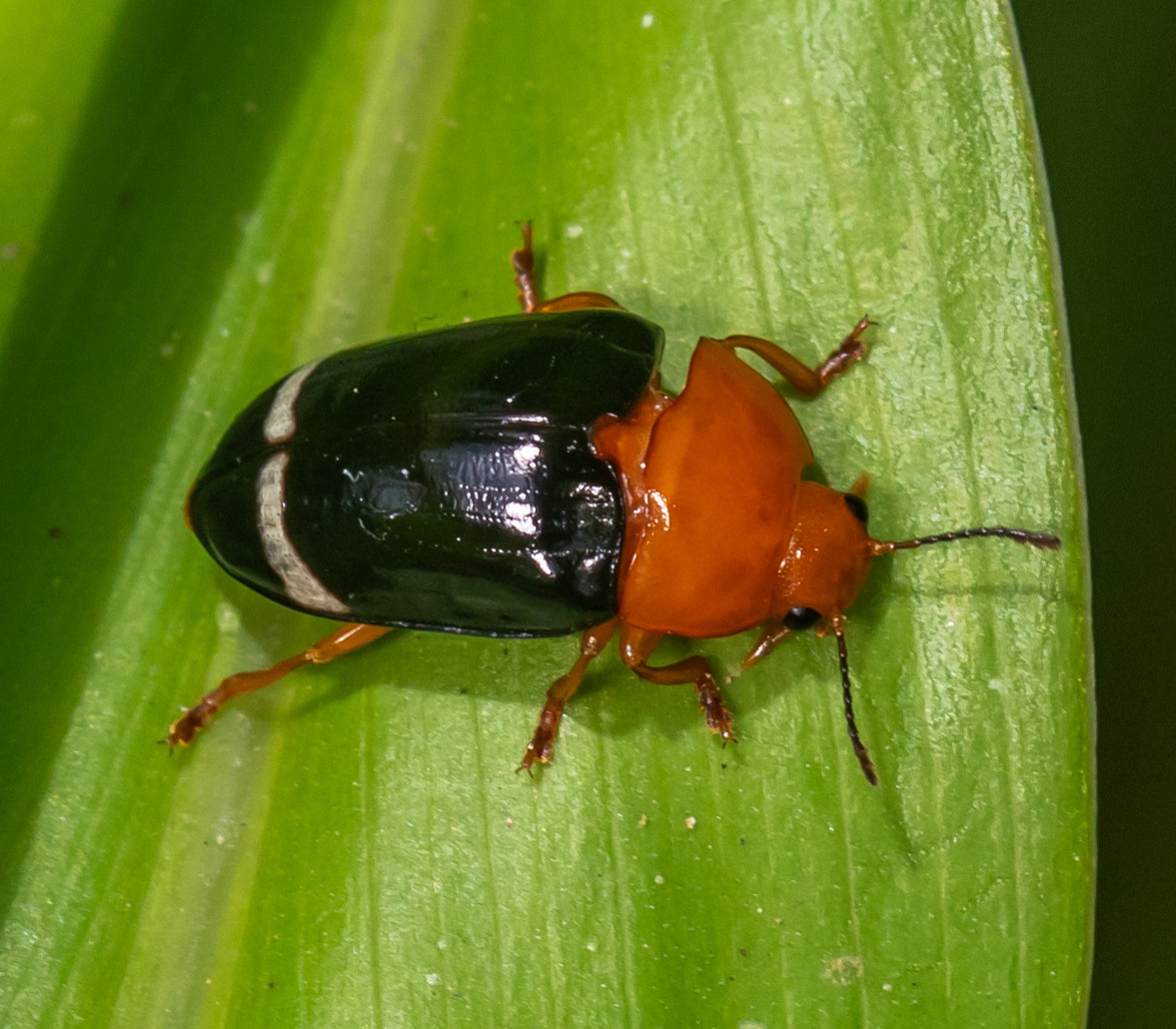
Mycotretus mycetophagoides in San Roque de Cumbaza, Peru

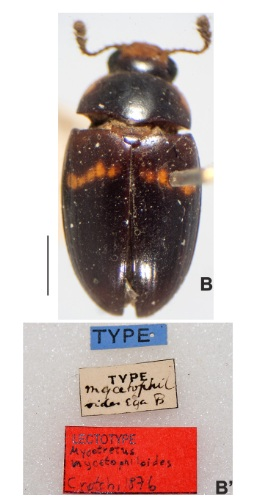
Mycotretus mycetophiloides specimen from Tefé, Brazil

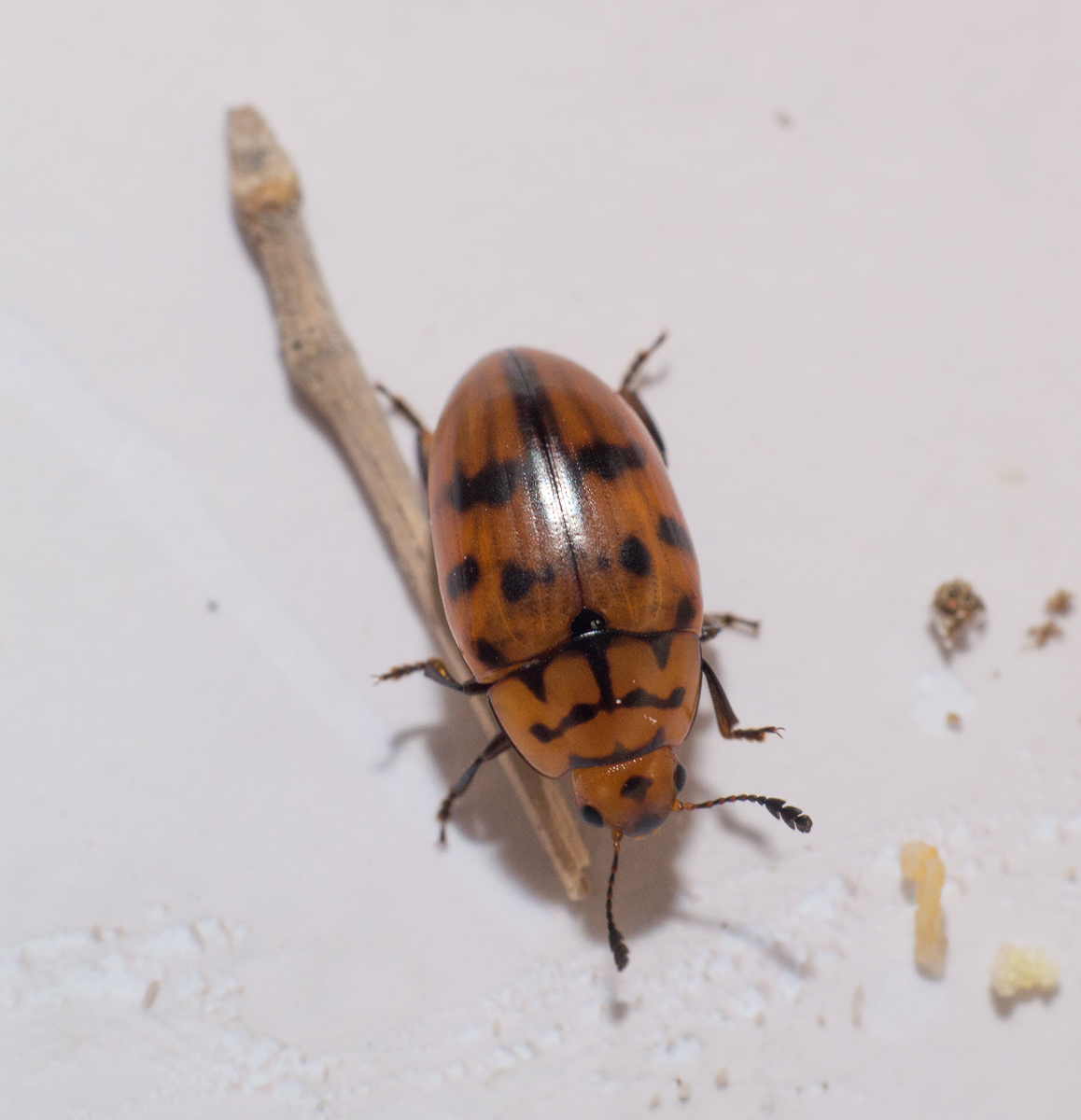
Mycotretus ornatus in Buenos Aires, Argentina

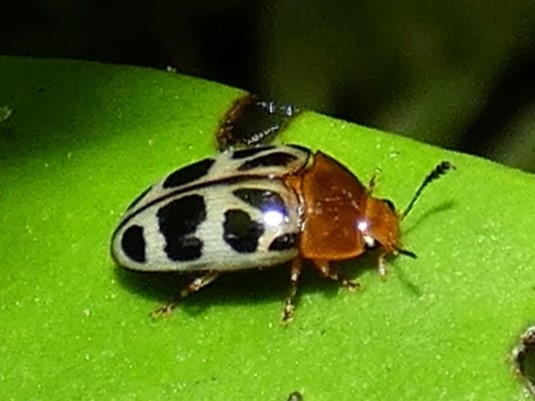
Mycotretus pecari in El Valle de Antón, Panama

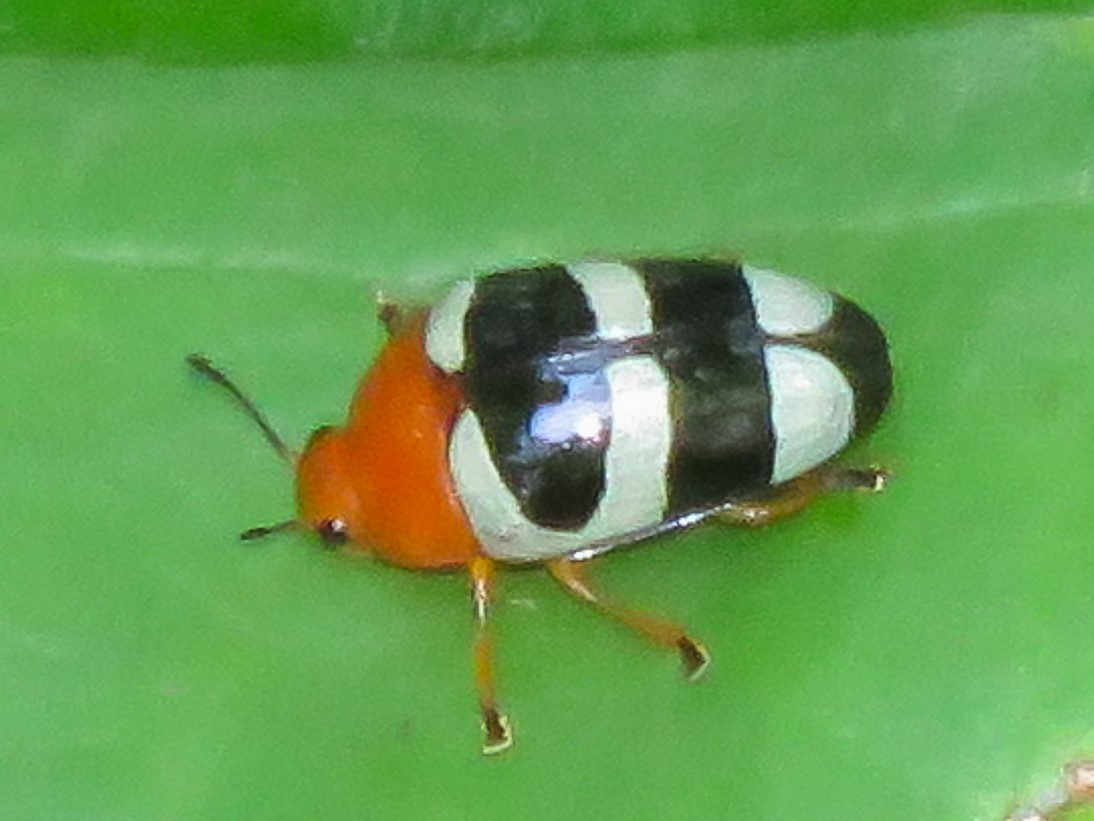
Mycotretus psittacus in Tinguá, Brazil

- Mycotretus adalioides Crotch, 1876 (tentatively placed here)
- Mycotretus aegrotus Gorham, 1888
- Mycotretus aestuans Lacordaire, 1842
- Mycotretus alvarengai Pecci-Maddalena & Lopes-Andrade, 2018
- Mycotretus ambulator Lacordaire, 1842
- Mycotretus anchoralis Guérin, 1956
- Mycotretus arcuatus Lacordaire, 1842
- Mycotretus argus Lacordaire, 1842
- Mycotretus atricaudatus Gorham, 1888
- Mycotretus badius Gorham, 1888
- Mycotretus balteatus Crotch, 1876
- Mycotretus bicolor Taschenberg, 1870 (= M.monrosi)
- Mycotretus bicoloratus Kuhnt, 1911 (= M.bicolor Kirsch, 1876, nec Taschenberg, 1870: preoccupied)
- Mycotretus bipunctatus Gorham, 1888
- Mycotretus bistrigatus Lacordaire, 1842
- Mycotretus bistrioculatus Alvarenga, 1983
- Mycotretus brasilianus Crotch, 1876
- Mycotretus brevis Gorham, 1888
- Mycotretus centralis Arrow, 1909 (= M.tigrinus Gorham, 1887, nec Olivier, 1792: preoccupied)
- Mycotretus cercyonoides Gorham, 1888
- Mycotretus chilensis Crotch, 1876 (= M.bicinctus)
- Mycotretus cinctiger Crotch, 1876 (= M.luizi)
- Mycotretus clitelliger Lacordaire, 1842
- Mycotretus coccidulinus Gorham, 1888
- Mycotretus coelestinus Lacordaire, 1842
- Mycotretus consanguineus Gorham, 1888
- Mycotretus cordiger Crotch, 1876 (= M.zischkai)
- Mycotretus cribratus Gorham, 1888
- Mycotretus cruciger Crotch, 1876
- Mycotretus crudus Gorham, 1888
- Mycotretus cruentus Gorham, 1888
- Mycotretus cunctans Mader, 1942
- Mycotretus cyanopterus Lacordaire, 1842
- Mycotretus decoratus (Duponchel, 1825)
- Mycotretus decorus Crotch, 1876
- Mycotretus deyrollei Crotch, 1876 (= M.discipennis, M.sexlineatus)
- Mycotretus dichrous Kirsch, 1876
- Mycotretus dimidiatus Taschenberg, 1870
- Mycotretus distigma Lacordaire, 1842
- Mycotretus distinguendus Arrow, 1909
- Mycotretus dorsofasciatus Lacordaire, 1842 (= M.nugator)
- Mycotretus dorsonotatus Lacordaire, 1842 (= M.alternans, M.quadristriolatus)
- Mycotretus duodecimguttatus (Duponchel, 1825) (= M.ocellatus)
- Mycotretus durius Lacordaire, 1842
- Mycotretus dytiscoides Lacordaire, 1842
- Mycotretus egae Crotch, 1876 (= M.basalis)
- Mycotretus elegans Gorham, 1888
- Mycotretus episcaphoides Crotch, 1876
- Mycotretus episcopalis Lacordaire, 1842
- Mycotretus epopterus Gorham, 1888
- Mycotretus erraticus Gorham, 1898
- Mycotretus expressus Kuhnt, 1910
- Mycotretus fallax (Guérin-Méneville, 1841)
- Mycotretus fasciolatus Lacordaire, 1842
- Mycotretus fascipennis Kuhnt, 1910
- Mycotretus fidelis Delkeskamp, 1939 (= M.parallelus Kuhnt, 1909, nec Crotch, 1876: preoccupied)
- Mycotretus flavomarginatus Lacordaire, 1842 (= M.major)
- Mycotretus floriger Lacordaire, 1842
- Mycotretus fulviceps Crotch, 1876
- Mycotretus fulvilabris Crotch, 1876 (= M.rastratus)
- Mycotretus geminus Gorham, 1888
- Mycotretus guatemalae Crotch, 1876
- Mycotretus haemapterus Gorham, 1888
- Mycotretus haematicus Gorham, 1888
- Mycotretus hepaticus Lacordaire, 1842
- Mycotretus hilaris Lacordaire, 1842
- Mycotretus hirudo Gorham, 1888
- Mycotretus humeralis (Germar, 1824)
- Mycotretus humilis Lacordaire, 1842
- Mycotretus illustris Crotch, 1876
- Mycotretus incarnatus Gorham, 1888
- Mycotretus interstictus Gorham, 1888 (= M.interstitialis)
- Mycotretus jocosus Lacordaire, 1842
- Mycotretus laccophilinus Gorham, 1888
- Mycotretus lacertosus Lacordaire, 1842
- Mycotretus laeviventris Crotch, 1876
- Mycotretus lepidus Lacordaire, 1842 (= M.chontalesi, M.graniformis)
- Mycotretus leprosus Lacordaire, 1842
- Mycotretus lesueuri (Chevrolat, 1835) (= M.savignyi)
- Mycotretus limbatus (Lacordaire, 1842)
- Mycotretus lissomoides Crotch, 1876
- Mycotretus luteipes Lacordaire, 1842
- Mycotretus luteolus Gorham, 1888
- Mycotretus maculatus (Olivier, 1792) (= M.figuratus, M.mutabilis)
- Mycotretus magus Lacordaire, 1842
- Mycotretus marginicollis Lacordaire, 1842
- Mycotretus melanopterus Lacordaire, 1842
- Mycotretus melanotus Gorham, 1888
- Mycotretus miniatus Lacordaire, 1842
- Mycotretus minutus (Duponchel, 1825) (= M.quadrinus)
- Mycotretus misellus Lacordaire, 1842
- Mycotretus mycetophagoides Crotch, 1876
- Mycotretus mycetophiloides Crotch, 1876
- Mycotretus nigricollis Gorham, 1888
- Mycotretus nigripes Gorham, 1888
- Mycotretus nigrivittis Lacordaire, 1842
- Mycotretus nigromanicatus Boyle, 1954
- Mycotretus nitescens Crotch, 1876
- Mycotretus normalis Gorham, 1888
- Mycotretus noterinus Gorham, 1888
- Mycotretus octoculatus Alvarenga, 1983
- Mycotretus opalescens Crotch, 1876 (= M.pelliciens)
- Mycotretus opalizans Mader, 1942
- Mycotretus oppositipunctum Gorham, 1888
- Mycotretus ornatus (Duponchel, 1825) (= M.cognatus, M.coronatus, M.difficilis, M.dispar, M.dubius, M.godarti, M.graphoderus, M.intermedius, M.maculosus, M.melanostictus, M.nigropunctatus, M.partitialis, M.posticus, M.puncticollis, M.terminalis)
- Mycotretus pallidior (Crotch, 1876) (= M.nigrotinctus)
- Mycotretus palmiphilus Lacordaire, 1842
- Mycotretus panamanus Gorham, 1888
- Mycotretus parallelus Crotch, 1876
- Mycotretus partitus Lacordaire, 1842
- Mycotretus pebasensis Crotch, 1876
- Mycotretus pecari Lacordaire, 1842
- Mycotretus peruae Crotch, 1876
- Mycotretus pictopiceus Gorham, 1888
- Mycotretus planus Gorham, 1888
- Mycotretus polyophthalmus Lacordaire, 1842
- Mycotretus prioteloides Mader, 1942
- Mycotretus psittacus Lacordaire, 1842
- Mycotretus psylloboroides Crotch, 1876
- Mycotretus pulchellus Lacordaire, 1842
- Mycotretus puncticeps Kirsch, 1865
- Mycotretus pusillus Lacordaire, 1842
- Mycotretus pygmaeus Lacordaire, 1842
- Mycotretus quadrioculatus Alvarenga, 1983
- Mycotretus quadripunctatus Crotch, 1876
- Mycotretus quattuordecimguttatus Lacordaire, 1842 (= M.bisseptemguttatus)
- Mycotretus reticulatus Crotch, 1876 (= M.lopesi)
- Mycotretus rhodosomus Lacordaire, 1842 (= M.nigromaculatus)
- Mycotretus rubidus Gorham, 1888
- Mycotretus rufilabris (Lacordaire, 1842)
- Mycotretus rufipennis Gorham, 1888
- Mycotretus sallaei Crotch, 1876
- Mycotretus sandicatus Gorham, 1888
- Mycotretus sanguineus (Duponchel, 1825)
- Mycotretus sannio Lacordaire, 1842
- Mycotretus scalaris Lacordaire, 1842
- Mycotretus scitulus Lacordaire, 1842 (= M.derasofasciatus, M.nubifer)
- Mycotretus sedecimguttatus (Guérin-Méneville, 1844)
- Mycotretus seminiger Harold, 1876 (= M.dimidiatus Crotch, 1876, nec Taschenberg, 1870: preoccupied)
- Mycotretus separandus Crotch, 1876
- Mycotretus sericeonitens Crotch, 1876
- Mycotretus sexoculatus Lacordaire, 1842
- Mycotretus sexpunctatus Gorham, 1888
- Mycotretus signatellus Crotch, 1876 (= M.fragosoi)
- Mycotretus singularis Lacordaire, 1842
- Mycotretus sobrinus (Guérin-Méneville, 1841) (= "M.simplex" (nomen nudum), M.silaceus)
- Mycotretus spadiceus Gorham, 1888
- Mycotretus sticticollis Lacordaire, 1842
- Mycotretus stillatus Kuhnt, 1910
- Mycotretus stramineus Gorham, 1888
- Mycotretus succinctus Crotch, 1876
- Mycotretus suturalis Kirsch, 1876
- Mycotretus ternotatus Gorham, 1888
- Mycotretus tesserarius Lacordaire, 1842
- Mycotretus thoracicus Kuhnt, 1910
- Mycotretus tibialis Gorham, 1888
- Mycotretus tigratus Lacordaire, 1842 (= M.nigrocinctus, M.trabeatus)
- Mycotretus tigrinoides Mader, 1942
- Mycotretus tigrinus (Olivier, 1792) (= M.leopardus, M.multimaculatus)
- Mycotretus tigripennis Mader, 1942
- Mycotretus tricolor Crotch, 1876
- Mycotretus trifasciatus Guérin, 1956 (= "M.bruchi" (nomen nudum))
- Mycotretus tucuruiensis Alvarenga, 1983
- Mycotretus vilis Lacordaire, 1842
- Mycotretus vittatus Gorham, 1888
- Mycotretus xanthomelas Crotch, 1876
- Mycotretus ziczac Kuhnt, 1910

A supposed Mycotretus species from Isla de Mona near Puerto Rico collected by J.A.Ramos in the early 20th century is actually a species of the monommatine beetle genus Hyporhagus. These deceptively resemble certain erotylid beetles (such as Mycotretus) in overall appearance, but actually belong to another branch of Cucujiformia. As of 2009, no species of Mycotretus were known from the Caribbean offshore islands.

In addition, the names "Mycotretus bruchi" and "M.unguicularis", despite having been attributed to Bruch, 1915, were never validly established; they are nomina nuda. The former has been identified as Mycotretus trifasciatus, while the latter is still undeterminable.

It is also possible that undescribed Mycotretus species still exist. A review of the UPN collection found two apparent Mycotretus specimens – one each from Caquetá Department in southern and Tolima Department in central Colombia – which did not seem to match the species known from the region.

=== Formerly placed here ===
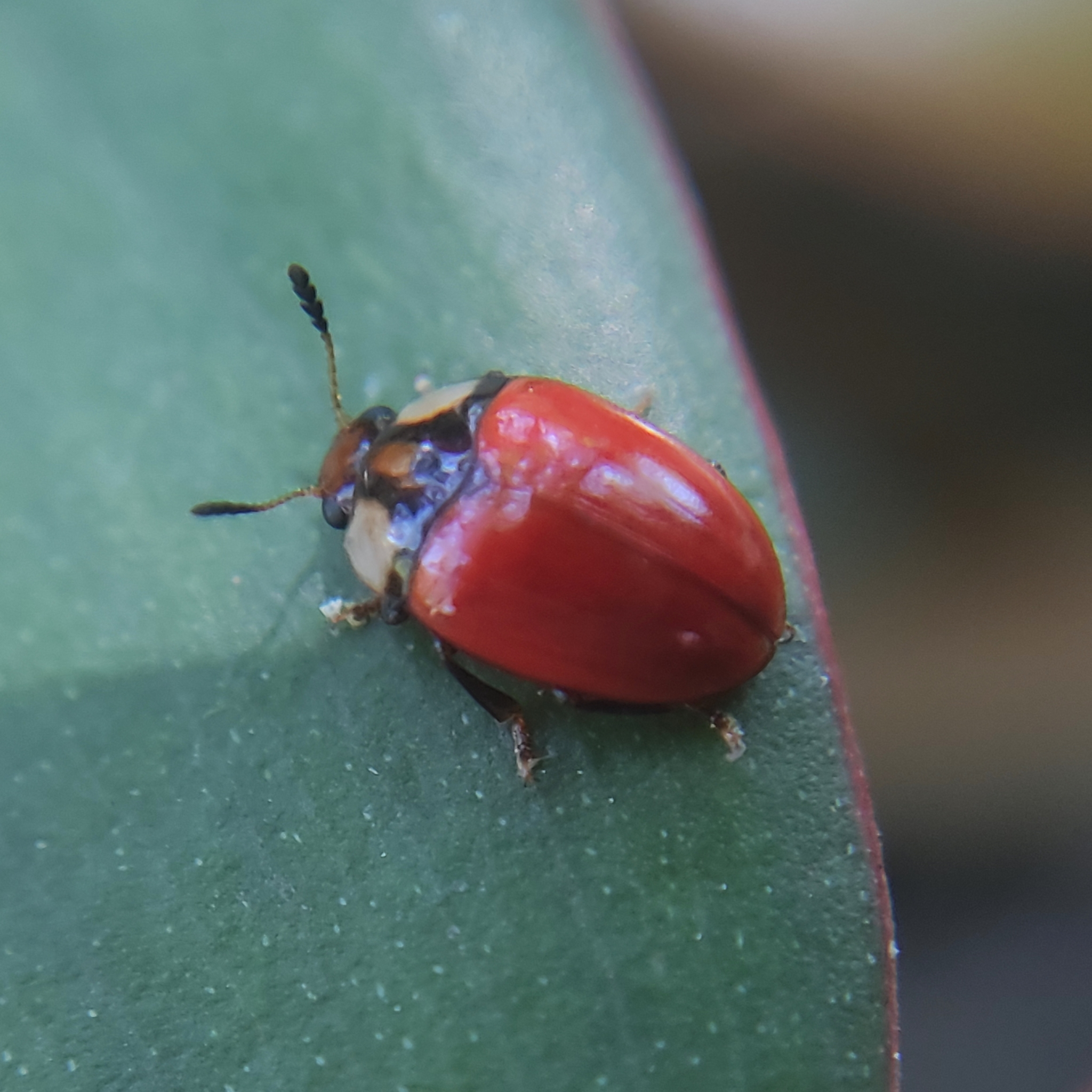
Mycomystes apicalis was mistaken for a new species of Mycotretus by several 19th-century experts

Several species traditionally placed in Mycotretus have eventually turned out to belong to other genera:

- "Mycotretus" pulcher is now in Aporotritoma
- "Mycotretus" hieroglyphicus is now in Callischyrus
- "Mycotretus" chrysomelinus is now in Cyclomorphus
- "Mycotretus" fasciatus belongs to genus Epopterus of family Endomychidae (handsome fungus beetles)
- "Mycotretus" virgatus is now in Iphiclus
- Now in Mycomystes:
  - "Mycotretus" apicalis (including M.coccinelloides, M.corallipennis, M.gemmula, M.gentilis, M.nigroterminatus and M.pulicarius)
  - "Mycotretus" coccineus (including M.sanguinosus and M.unicolor)
  - "Mycotretus" fuscitarsis
  - "Mycotretus" melanophthalmus (including M.cinctellus and M.discoidalis)
  - "Mycotretus" peruvianus
- "Mycotretus" antesignatus is now in Mycolybas
- Now in Notaepytus:
  - "Mycotretus" flavitarsis (including M.signaticollis and M.thoracica)
  - "Mycotretus" modestus
- "Mycotretus" sanguinipennis is now in Rotitma
- Now in Triplax:
  - "Mycotretus" dissimulator
  - "Mycotretus" triplacoides

The Ischyrus species of Lacordaire's "second division", placed by Dejean in Mycotretus, are I.incertus, I.interruptus, I.laetus, I.patruelis (="M." similis), I.quadripunctatus (="M." humeralis, "M." subcylindricus, "M." variegata), I.scriptus (= "M." affinis), and I.variabilis.
