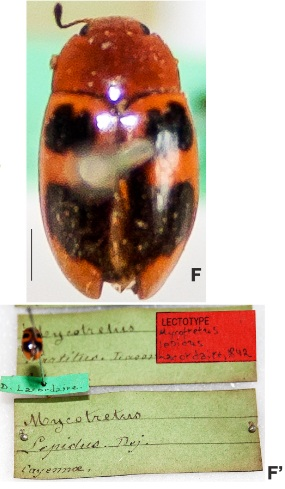

Scientific classification
- Kingdom: Animalia
- Phylum: Arthropoda
- Clade: Pancrustacea
- Class: Insecta
- Order: Coleoptera
- Suborder: Polyphaga
- Infraorder: Cucujiformia
- Family: Erotylidae
- Genus: Mycotretus
- Species: M. lepidus

Binomial name
- Mycotretus lepidus Lacordaire, 1842

Synonyms
- Mycotretus graniformis Lacordaire, 1842; Mycotretus chontalesi Crotch, 1873b

= Mycotretus lepidus =

Species of beetle

Mycotretus lepidus is a species of beetle of the Erotylidae family. This species is found in Nicaragua, northern Brazil, Bolivia, French Guiana, Suriname, Ecuador and Peru.
