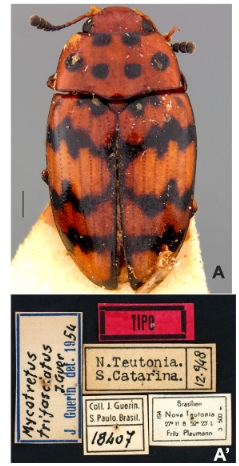

Scientific classification
- Kingdom: Animalia
- Phylum: Arthropoda
- Clade: Pancrustacea
- Class: Insecta
- Order: Coleoptera
- Suborder: Polyphaga
- Infraorder: Cucujiformia
- Family: Erotylidae
- Genus: Mycotretus
- Species: M. trifasciatus

Binomial name
- Mycotretus trifasciatus Guérin, 1956

Synonyms
- "Mycotretus bruchi" Bruch, 1915 (nomen nudum)

= Mycotretus trifasciatus =

Species of beetle

Mycotretus trifasciatus is a species of beetle of the Erotylidae family. This species is found in southern and southeastern Brazil.
