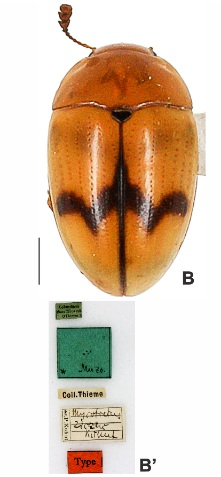
- Mycotretus ziczac ziczac
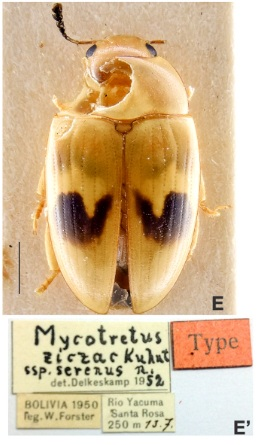
- Mycotretus ziczac serenus

Scientific classification
- Kingdom: Animalia
- Phylum: Arthropoda
- Class: Insecta
- Order: Coleoptera
- Suborder: Polyphaga
- Infraorder: Cucujiformia
- Family: Erotylidae
- Genus: Mycotretus
- Species: M. ziczac

Binomial name
- Mycotretus ziczac Kuhnt, 1910

= Mycotretus ziczac =

Species of beetle

Mycotretus ziczac is a species of beetle of the Erotylidae family. This species is found in Colombia and Bolivia.

== Subspecies ==
- Mycotretus ziczac ziczac (Colombia)
- Mycotretus ziczac serenus Delkeskamp, 1957 (Bolivia)
