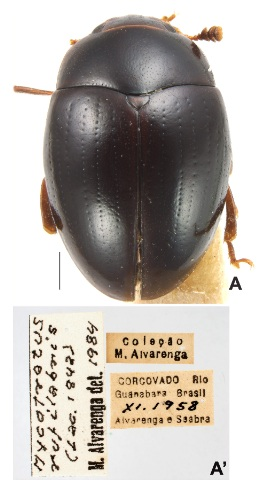

Scientific classification
- Kingdom: Animalia
- Phylum: Arthropoda
- Class: Insecta
- Order: Coleoptera
- Suborder: Polyphaga
- Infraorder: Cucujiformia
- Family: Erotylidae
- Genus: Mycotretus
- Species: M. rufilabris

Binomial name
- Mycotretus rufilabris (Lacordaire, 1842)

Synonyms
- Tritoma rufilabris Lacordaire, 1842

= Mycotretus rufilabris =

Species of beetle

Mycotretus rufilabris is a species of beetle of the Erotylidae family. This species is found in Brazil.
