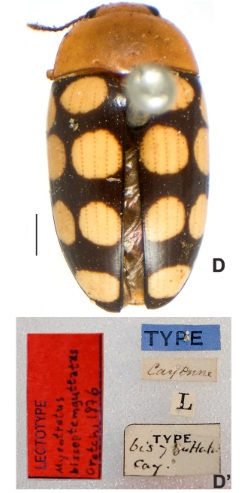

Scientific classification
- Kingdom: Animalia
- Phylum: Arthropoda
- Clade: Pancrustacea
- Class: Insecta
- Order: Coleoptera
- Suborder: Polyphaga
- Infraorder: Cucujiformia
- Family: Erotylidae
- Genus: Mycotretus
- Species: M. quattuordecimguttatus

Binomial name
- Mycotretus quattuordecimguttatus Lacordaire, 1842

Synonyms
- Mycotretus bisseptemguttatus Crotch, 1876

= Mycotretus quattuordecimguttatus =

Species of beetle

Mycotretus quattuordecimguttatus is a species of beetle of the Erotylidae family. This species is found in Colombia and Brazil.
