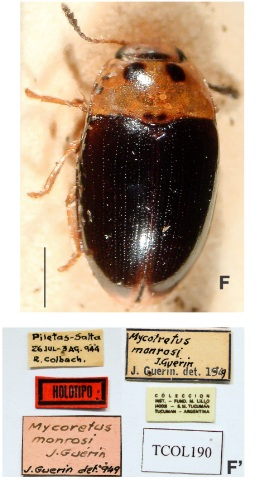

Scientific classification
- Kingdom: Animalia
- Phylum: Arthropoda
- Class: Insecta
- Order: Coleoptera
- Suborder: Polyphaga
- Infraorder: Cucujiformia
- Family: Erotylidae
- Genus: Mycotretus
- Species: M. bicolor

Binomial name
- Mycotretus bicolor Taschenberg, 1870

Synonyms
- Mycotretus monrosi Guérin, 1949

= Mycotretus bicolor =

Species of beetle

Mycotretus bicolor is a species of beetle of the Erotylidae family. This species is found in Colombia, Ecuador, Peru, Bolivia and Argentina.
