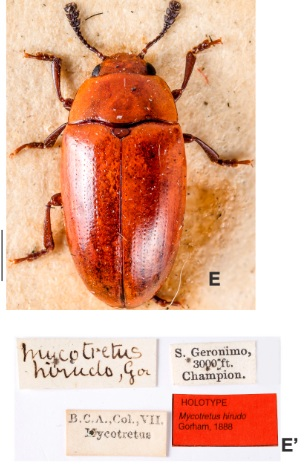

Scientific classification
- Kingdom: Animalia
- Phylum: Arthropoda
- Class: Insecta
- Order: Coleoptera
- Suborder: Polyphaga
- Infraorder: Cucujiformia
- Family: Erotylidae
- Genus: Mycotretus
- Species: M. hirudo

Binomial name
- Mycotretus hirudo Gorham, 1888

= Mycotretus hirudo =

Species of beetle

Mycotretus hirudo is a species of beetle of the Erotylidae family. This species is found in Guatemala.
