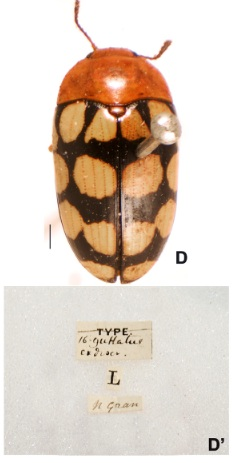

Scientific classification
- Kingdom: Animalia
- Phylum: Arthropoda
- Clade: Pancrustacea
- Class: Insecta
- Order: Coleoptera
- Suborder: Polyphaga
- Infraorder: Cucujiformia
- Family: Erotylidae
- Genus: Mycotretus
- Species: M. sedecimguttatus

Binomial name
- Mycotretus sedecimguttatus (Guérin-Méneville, 1844)

Synonyms
- Ischyrus sedecimguttatus Guérin-Méneville, 1844

= Mycotretus sedecimguttatus =

Species of beetle

Mycotretus sedecimguttatus is a species of beetle of the Erotylidae family. This species is found in Colombia.
