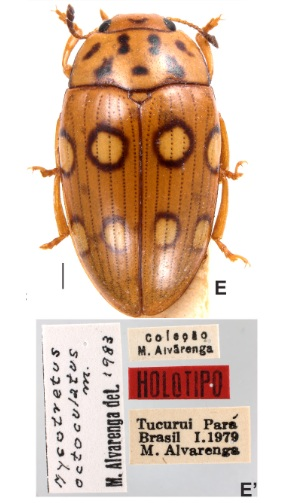

Scientific classification
- Kingdom: Animalia
- Phylum: Arthropoda
- Clade: Pancrustacea
- Class: Insecta
- Order: Coleoptera
- Suborder: Polyphaga
- Infraorder: Cucujiformia
- Family: Erotylidae
- Genus: Mycotretus
- Species: M. octoculatus

Binomial name
- Mycotretus octoculatus Alvarenga, 1983

Synonyms
- Mycotretus oculatus (lapsus)

= Mycotretus octoculatus =

Species of beetle

Mycotretus octoculatus is a species of beetle of the Erotylidae family. This species is found in northern and southeastern Brazil.
