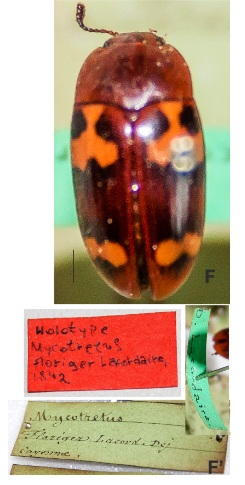

Scientific classification
- Kingdom: Animalia
- Phylum: Arthropoda
- Clade: Pancrustacea
- Class: Insecta
- Order: Coleoptera
- Suborder: Polyphaga
- Infraorder: Cucujiformia
- Family: Erotylidae
- Genus: Mycotretus
- Species: M. floriger

Binomial name
- Mycotretus floriger Lacordaire, 1842

= Mycotretus floriger =

Species of beetle

Mycotretus floriger is a species of beetle of the Erotylidae family. This species is found in French Guiana, central-western and northern Brazil.

In addition, there is material of this species from Peru in the University of Georgia Collection of Arthropods.
