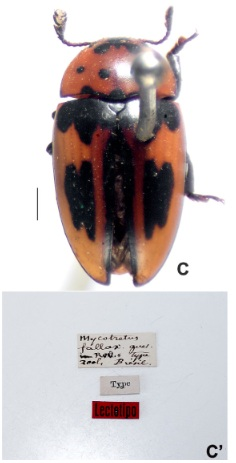

Scientific classification
- Kingdom: Animalia
- Phylum: Arthropoda
- Clade: Pancrustacea
- Class: Insecta
- Order: Coleoptera
- Suborder: Polyphaga
- Infraorder: Cucujiformia
- Family: Erotylidae
- Genus: Mycotretus
- Species: M. fallax

Binomial name
- Mycotretus fallax (Guérin-Méneville, 1841)

Synonyms
- Erotylus fallax Guérin-Méneville, 1841

= Mycotretus fallax =

Species of beetle

Mycotretus fallax is a species of beetle in the family Erotylidae. This species is found in southern and south-eastern Brazil.
