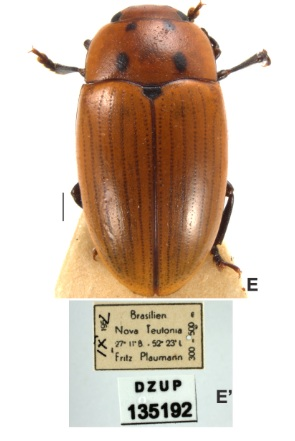

Scientific classification
- Kingdom: Animalia
- Phylum: Arthropoda
- Clade: Pancrustacea
- Class: Insecta
- Order: Coleoptera
- Suborder: Polyphaga
- Infraorder: Cucujiformia
- Family: Erotylidae
- Genus: Mycotretus
- Species: M. minutus

Binomial name
- Mycotretus minutus (Duponchel, 1825)

Synonyms
- Erotylus minutus Duponchel, 1825; Mycotretus quadrinus Lacordaire, 1842

= Mycotretus minutus =

Species of beetle

Mycotretus minutus is a species of beetle in the family Erotylidae. This species is found in southern and south-eastern Brazil.
