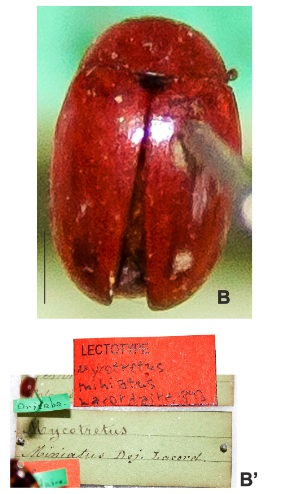

Scientific classification
- Kingdom: Animalia
- Phylum: Arthropoda
- Class: Insecta
- Order: Coleoptera
- Suborder: Polyphaga
- Infraorder: Cucujiformia
- Family: Erotylidae
- Genus: Mycotretus
- Species: M. miniatus

Binomial name
- Mycotretus miniatus Lacordaire, 1842

= Mycotretus miniatus =

Species of beetle

Mycotretus miniatus is a species of beetle of the Erotylidae family. This species is found in Mexico and Guatemala.
