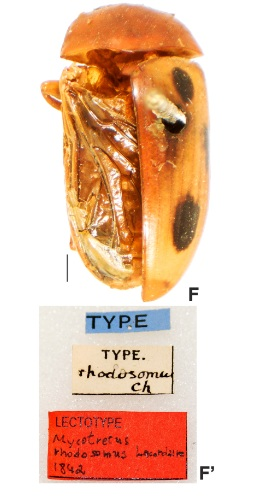

Scientific classification
- Kingdom: Animalia
- Phylum: Arthropoda
- Clade: Pancrustacea
- Class: Insecta
- Order: Coleoptera
- Suborder: Polyphaga
- Infraorder: Cucujiformia
- Family: Erotylidae
- Genus: Mycotretus
- Species: M. rhodosomus

Binomial name
- Mycotretus rhodosomus Lacordaire, 1842

Synonyms
- Brachysphaenus (Iphiclus) nigromaculatus Kuhnt, 1909; Mycotretus nigromaculatus (Kuhnt, 1909)

= Mycotretus rhodosomus =

Species of beetle

Mycotretus rhodosomus is a species of beetle of the Erotylidae family. This species is found in southeastern Brazil and possibly Mexico.
