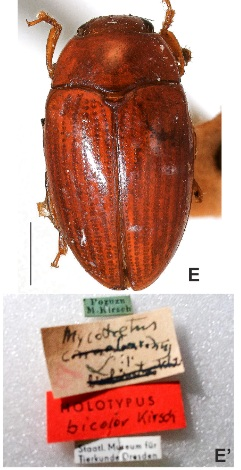

Scientific classification
- Kingdom: Animalia
- Phylum: Arthropoda
- Class: Insecta
- Order: Coleoptera
- Suborder: Polyphaga
- Infraorder: Cucujiformia
- Family: Erotylidae
- Genus: Mycotretus
- Species: M. bicoloratus

Binomial name
- Mycotretus bicoloratus Kuhnt, 1911

Synonyms
- Mycotretus bicolor Kirsch, 1876

= Mycotretus bicoloratus =

Species of beetle

Mycotretus bicoloratus is a species of beetle of the Erotylidae family. This species is found in Peru.
