= Hyposerica grandidieri =

Scientific classification
- Kingdom: Animalia
- Phylum: Arthropoda
- Class: Insecta
- Order: Coleoptera
- Suborder: Polyphaga
- Infraorder: Scarabaeiformia
- Family: Scarabaeidae
- Genus: Hyposerica
- Species: H. grandidieri

Binomial name
- Hyposerica grandidieri Brenske, 1899

Species of beetle

Hyposerica grandidieri is a species of beetle of the family Scarabaeidae. It is found in Madagascar.

== Description ==
Adults reach a length of about 8 mm. They are yellowish-brown with lighter elytra and a darker head and pronotum. It is in many respects very similar to Hyposerica dauphinensis, but may be distinguished by the very densely haired, narrow lateral margin of the elytra. The clypeus is weakly margined, wrinkled-punctate. The pronotum has distinctly curved sides posteriorly, like Hyposerica humbloti, but is somewhat wider than in this species. The surface is strongly punctate. The elytra are more finely and densely punctate, becoming more indistinct posteriorly. The ribs are almost gone, as are the rows of punctures, but the suture is narrowly raised, with fine setae here and beside the sides. The lateral margin, where the marginal setae are located, is very narrow and very densely ciliate, so that the hairs partly touch. The pygidium is finely punctate.
