= Hyposerica klugi =

Scientific classification
- Kingdom: Animalia
- Phylum: Arthropoda
- Class: Insecta
- Order: Coleoptera
- Suborder: Polyphaga
- Infraorder: Scarabaeiformia
- Family: Scarabaeidae
- Genus: Hyposerica
- Species: H. klugi

Binomial name
- Hyposerica klugi Brenske, 1899

Species of beetle

Hyposerica klugi is a species of beetle of the family Scarabaeidae. It is found in Madagascar.

== Description ==
Adults reach a length of about 5.5 mm. They are similar to Hyposerica cruciata in colour and form, but the elytra are somewhat longer, the hind coxae are larger, the middle of the thorax is covered with short white hairs (the sides less so) and the hind tibiae are somewhat broadened towards the tip.
