= Maladera rotunda =

Scientific classification
- Kingdom: Animalia
- Phylum: Arthropoda
- Class: Insecta
- Order: Coleoptera
- Suborder: Polyphaga
- Infraorder: Scarabaeiformia
- Family: Scarabaeidae
- Genus: Maladera
- Species: M. rotunda

Binomial name
- Maladera rotunda (Arrow, 1946)

Synonyms
- Cephaloserica rotunda Arrow, 1946

Species of beetle

Maladera rotunda is a species of beetle of the family Scarabaeidae. It is found in Laos, Myanmar, Thailand and China (Yunnan).

== Description ==
Adults reach a length of about 8.8 mm. They have a dark brown, oval body, with yellowish antennae. The dorsal surface is mostly dull and glabrous, except for a few setae on the head and along the sides of the elytra.
