= Maladera bilobata =

Scientific classification
- Kingdom: Animalia
- Phylum: Arthropoda
- Class: Insecta
- Order: Coleoptera
- Suborder: Polyphaga
- Infraorder: Scarabaeiformia
- Family: Scarabaeidae
- Genus: Maladera
- Species: M. bilobata

Binomial name
- Maladera bilobata (Arrow, 1945)

Synonyms
- Hemiserica bilobata Arrow, 1945

Species of beetle

Maladera bilobata is a species of beetle of the family Scarabaeidae. It is found in India (Tamil Nadu).

== Description ==
Adults reach a length of about 5.7–6 mm. They have a yellowish brown, oval body. The antennae are yellow. The dorsal surface is mostly dull and almost glabrous, except for a few small setae on the head and elytra.
