= Hyposerica mystica =

Scientific classification
- Kingdom: Animalia
- Phylum: Arthropoda
- Class: Insecta
- Order: Coleoptera
- Suborder: Polyphaga
- Infraorder: Scarabaeiformia
- Family: Scarabaeidae
- Genus: Hyposerica
- Species: H. mystica

Binomial name
- Hyposerica mystica Brenske, 1899

Species of beetle

Hyposerica mystica is a species of beetle of the family Scarabaeidae. It is found in Madagascar.

== Description ==
Adults reach a length of about 7.5 mm. They have an oblong oval, dark reddish-brown, purplish-shimmering, dull body, which is less opalescent underneath. They are very similar to Hyposerica delecta. The clypeus is very densely wrinkled and punctate, the frons is tomentose, not shiny anteriorly, the hind angles of the pronotum are similarly rounded, the punctation is more pronounced on the elytra and the punctures are somewhat cracked. The minor striae are absent, and the major striae are only weakly distinct.
