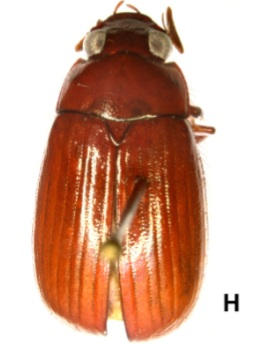

Scientific classification
- Kingdom: Animalia
- Phylum: Arthropoda
- Class: Insecta
- Order: Coleoptera
- Suborder: Polyphaga
- Infraorder: Scarabaeiformia
- Family: Scarabaeidae
- Genus: Selaserica
- Species: S. sororinitida

Binomial name
- Selaserica sororinitida Ranasinghe et al., 2022

= Selaserica sororinitida =

Species of beetle

Selaserica sororinitida is a species of beetle of the family Scarabaeidae. It is found in Sri Lanka.

== Description ==
Adults reach a length of about 9.9–12 mm (males) and 12–12.2 mm (females). They have an oblong, reddish brown body. The antennae are yellow and the dorsal surface is shiny and glabrous, while the ventral surface is dull.

== Etymology ==
The species name is derived from Latin soror (meaning sister) and nitida from the species Selaserica nitida and refers to the strong morphological similarity with this species.
