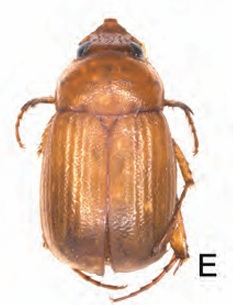

Scientific classification
- Kingdom: Animalia
- Phylum: Arthropoda
- Class: Insecta
- Order: Coleoptera
- Suborder: Polyphaga
- Infraorder: Scarabaeiformia
- Family: Scarabaeidae
- Genus: Maladera
- Species: M. armipes

Binomial name
- Maladera armipes (Arrow, 1945)

Synonyms
- Hemiserica armipes Arrow, 1945

= Maladera armipes =

Species of beetle

Maladera armipes is a species of beetle of the family Scarabaeidae. It is found in India (Tamil Nadu).

== Description ==
Adults reach a length of about 4.6 mm. They have a yellowish brown, oval body. The antennae are yellow and the head is weakly shiny, while the remainder of the dorsal surface is dull and almost glabrous, except for a few small setae on the head and elytra.
