= Schizonycha decipiens =

Scientific classification
- Kingdom: Animalia
- Phylum: Arthropoda
- Clade: Pancrustacea
- Class: Insecta
- Order: Coleoptera
- Suborder: Polyphaga
- Infraorder: Scarabaeiformia
- Family: Scarabaeidae
- Genus: Schizonycha
- Species: S. decipiens

Binomial name
- Schizonycha decipiens Arrow, 1944

Species of beetle

Schizonycha decipiens is a species of beetle of the family Scarabaeidae. It is found in India.

== Description ==
Adults reach a length of about 14 mm (0.55 in). They are chestnut-red, with the head deep red and the elytra tawny yellow. The upper surface is covered with fine white setae.
