= Hyposerica mauritii =

Scientific classification
- Kingdom: Animalia
- Phylum: Arthropoda
- Clade: Pancrustacea
- Class: Insecta
- Order: Coleoptera
- Suborder: Polyphaga
- Infraorder: Scarabaeiformia
- Family: Scarabaeidae
- Genus: Hyposerica
- Species: H. mauritii

Binomial name
- Hyposerica mauritii Arrow, 1948

Species of beetle

Hyposerica mauritii is a species of beetle of the family Scarabaeidae. It is found on Mauritius.

== Description ==
Adults reach a length of about 11–12 mm. They are black or very dark reddish black, smooth and shining above and beneath, the lower surface and legs are deep red.
