= Maladera pseudoexima =

Scientific classification
- Kingdom: Animalia
- Phylum: Arthropoda
- Class: Insecta
- Order: Coleoptera
- Suborder: Polyphaga
- Infraorder: Scarabaeiformia
- Family: Scarabaeidae
- Genus: Maladera
- Species: M. pseudoexima

Binomial name
- Maladera pseudoexima (Arrow, 1946)

Species of beetle

Maladera pseudoexima is a species of beetle of the family Scarabaeidae. It is found in Laos, Thailand and China (Yunnan).

== Description ==
Adults reach a length of about 4.2–5.8 mm. They have a black, oval body. There are four yellowish red spots on the elytra and the head and pronotum have a greenish shine. The antennae are black. The labroclypeus is shiny, but the remainder of the dorsal surface is dull and, except for the setae on the head and along the sides of the pronotum and elytra. glabrous.

== Etymology ==
The species name is derived from Greek pseudo (meaning false) and the species name exima and refers to the similarity of both species.
