= Hyposerica martialis =

Scientific classification
- Kingdom: Animalia
- Phylum: Arthropoda
- Clade: Pancrustacea
- Class: Insecta
- Order: Coleoptera
- Suborder: Polyphaga
- Infraorder: Scarabaeiformia
- Family: Scarabaeidae
- Genus: Hyposerica
- Species: H. martialis

Binomial name
- Hyposerica martialis Arrow, 1948

Species of beetle

Hyposerica martialis is a species of beetle of the family Scarabaeidae. It is found on Mauritius.

== Description ==
Adults reach a length of about 10–11 mm. They are ferrugineous, with the antennae and legs yellow, the head, pronotum and scutellum red and the elytra dark reddish-brown.
