= Hyposerica suturalis =

Scientific classification
- Kingdom: Animalia
- Phylum: Arthropoda
- Clade: Pancrustacea
- Class: Insecta
- Order: Coleoptera
- Suborder: Polyphaga
- Infraorder: Scarabaeiformia
- Family: Scarabaeidae
- Genus: Hyposerica
- Species: H. suturalis

Binomial name
- Hyposerica suturalis Arrow, 1948

Species of beetle

Hyposerica suturalis is a species of beetle of the family Scarabaeidae. It is found on Mauritius.

== Description ==
Adults reach a length of about 9 mm. They are rusty red or ferruginous, with the antennae and legs a little paler. The head and pronotum are dark red, the scutellum is red and the elytra are dark red, with the entire circumference lighter red.
