= Hyposerica pernitida =

Scientific classification
- Kingdom: Animalia
- Phylum: Arthropoda
- Class: Insecta
- Order: Coleoptera
- Suborder: Polyphaga
- Infraorder: Scarabaeiformia
- Family: Scarabaeidae
- Genus: Hyposerica
- Species: H. pernitida

Binomial name
- Hyposerica pernitida (Fairmaire, 1897)

Synonyms
- Omaloplia pernitida Fairmaire, 1897

Species of beetle

Hyposerica pernitida is a species of beetle of the family Scarabaeidae. It is found in Madagascar.

== Description ==
Adults reach a length of about 10 mm. They are similar to Hyposerica grossa, but less wide and smaller, and with a darker colour. The elytra are without raised lines, and the punctuation is smaller. The surface is smoother.
