= Dipelicus bidens =

Scientific classification
- Kingdom: Animalia
- Phylum: Arthropoda
- Class: Insecta
- Order: Coleoptera
- Suborder: Polyphaga
- Infraorder: Scarabaeiformia
- Family: Scarabaeidae
- Genus: Dipelicus
- Species: D. bidens

Binomial name
- Dipelicus bidens Arrow, 1910

Species of beetle

Dipelicus bidens is a species of dung beetle native to India and Sri Lanka.
