= Dicranocnemus burchelli =

Scientific classification
- Kingdom: Animalia
- Phylum: Arthropoda
- Class: Insecta
- Order: Coleoptera
- Suborder: Polyphaga
- Infraorder: Scarabaeiformia
- Family: Scarabaeidae
- Genus: Dicranocnemus
- Species: D. burchelli

Binomial name
- Dicranocnemus burchelli Arrow, 1917

Species of beetle

Dicranocnemus burchelli is a species of beetle of the family Scarabaeidae. It is found in South Africa (Eastern Cape).

== Description ==
Adults reach a length of about 5.5 mm (0.22 in). They are fuscous, with the elytra and legs reddish. The upper surface of the head is uniformly finely rugose and pubescent. The pronotum is finely rugose and densely clothed with rather short tawny pubescence, which changes into scales at the posterior margin. The scutellum is clothed with elongate whitish scales and the elytra with round scales varying in colour from chocolate to pale yellow, the light ones forming a median longitudinal stripe which is broadest near the shoulder, a sutural stripe broadest at the apical end, and a quadrate patch between these. The pygidium and propygidium are densely covered with orange scales, with a darker band at the base of the former.
