= Selaserica maculicauda =

Scientific classification
- Kingdom: Animalia
- Phylum: Arthropoda
- Class: Insecta
- Order: Coleoptera
- Suborder: Polyphaga
- Infraorder: Scarabaeiformia
- Family: Scarabaeidae
- Genus: Selaserica
- Species: S. maculicauda

Binomial name
- Selaserica maculicauda (Arrow, 1916)

Synonyms
- Serica maculicauda Arrow, 1916

Species of beetle

Selaserica maculicauda is a species of beetle of the family Scarabaeidae. It is found in Sri Lanka.

== Description ==
Adults reach a length of about 11.3 mm. They have a reddish brown, oblong-oval body, with yellowish brown antennae. The dorsal surface is dull, except for the legs, which are shiny.
