= Serica velutina =

Scientific classification
- Kingdom: Animalia
- Phylum: Arthropoda
- Class: Insecta
- Order: Coleoptera
- Suborder: Polyphaga
- Infraorder: Scarabaeiformia
- Family: Scarabaeidae
- Genus: Serica
- Species: S. velutina

Binomial name
- Serica velutina Arrow, 1946

Species of beetle

Serica velutina is a species of beetle of the family Scarabaeidae. It is endemic to north-eastern Myanmar and Assam (Mishmi Hills).

== Description ==
Adults reach a length of about 9.7 mm. They have a reddish brown, elongate-oval body, with a greenish sheen. The legs and antennae are yellowish brown.
