= Stereomera pusilla =

Scientific classification
- Kingdom: Animalia
- Phylum: Arthropoda
- Clade: Pancrustacea
- Class: Insecta
- Order: Coleoptera
- Suborder: Polyphaga
- Infraorder: Scarabaeiformia
- Family: Scarabaeidae
- Genus: Stereomera
- Species: S. pusilla

Binomial name
- Stereomera pusilla Arrow, 1905

Species of beetle

Stereomera pusilla is a species of beetle of the family Scarabaeidae. It is found in Malaysia and Singapore.

== Description ==
Adults reach a length of about 2.5 mm (0.098 in). Both the upper surface and the underside of the body are reddish-brown and glabrous.
