= Hyposerica carinata =

Scientific classification
- Kingdom: Animalia
- Phylum: Arthropoda
- Class: Insecta
- Order: Coleoptera
- Suborder: Polyphaga
- Infraorder: Scarabaeiformia
- Family: Scarabaeidae
- Genus: Hyposerica
- Species: H. carinata

Binomial name
- Hyposerica carinata (Burmeister, 1855)

Synonyms
- Serica carinata Burmeister, 1855; Hyposerica stuperata Brenske

Species of beetle

Hyposerica carinata is a species of beetle of the family Scarabaeidae. It is found in Madagascar.

== Description ==
Adults reach a length of about 7.5 mm. They are chestnut brown and glossy. It is similar to Hyposerica rufina, but the frons is somewhat more punctate, without a group of setae and the elytra are more coarsely punctate with somewhat raised, smooth ribs, the transverse ridge before the apex very strongly raised and robust.
