= Hyposerica tibialis =

Scientific classification
- Kingdom: Animalia
- Phylum: Arthropoda
- Clade: Pancrustacea
- Class: Insecta
- Order: Coleoptera
- Suborder: Polyphaga
- Infraorder: Scarabaeiformia
- Family: Scarabaeidae
- Genus: Hyposerica
- Species: H. tibialis

Binomial name
- Hyposerica tibialis Arrow, 1948

Species of beetle

Hyposerica tibialis is a species of beetle of the family Scarabaeidae. It is found on Mauritius.

== Description ==
Adults reach a length of about 6–9 mm. They are testaceous or light brown, with the head and pronotum usually reddish brown and the elytra sometimes dark in the sutural region. The antennae and legs are pale.
