= Tanyproctoides arabicus =

Scientific classification
- Kingdom: Animalia
- Phylum: Arthropoda
- Class: Insecta
- Order: Coleoptera
- Suborder: Polyphaga
- Infraorder: Scarabaeiformia
- Family: Scarabaeidae
- Genus: Tanyproctoides
- Species: T. arabicus

Binomial name
- Tanyproctoides arabicus (Arrow, 1932)

Synonyms
- Phalangonyx arabicus Arrow, 1932; Tanyproctoides arabicus Petrovitz 1971

Species of beetle

Tanyproctoides arabicus is a species of beetle of the family Scarabaeidae. It is found in Saudi Arabia, Kuwait, Qatar and the United Arab Emirates.

== Description ==
Adults reach a length of about 12 mm. They are light brown, with the clypeus prolonged into a cone.
