= Hyposerica brunneipennis =

Scientific classification
- Kingdom: Animalia
- Phylum: Arthropoda
- Clade: Pancrustacea
- Class: Insecta
- Order: Coleoptera
- Suborder: Polyphaga
- Infraorder: Scarabaeiformia
- Family: Scarabaeidae
- Genus: Hyposerica
- Species: H. brunneipennis

Binomial name
- Hyposerica brunneipennis Moser, 1918

Species of beetle

Hyposerica brunneipennis is a species of beetle of the family Scarabaeidae. It is found in Madagascar.

== Description ==
Adults reach a length of about 10 mm. They are similar to Hyposerica micans, but the elytra are lighter brown. They are tomentose on the upper surface, but have a rather strong silky sheen. The head is strongly punctate and the antennae are reddish-yellow. The pronotum is rather densely punctate and the elytra also have fairly dense punctation. These punctures are covered with tiny setae and each elytron has four smooth ridges.
