= Hyposerica castanipes =

Scientific classification
- Kingdom: Animalia
- Phylum: Arthropoda
- Class: Insecta
- Order: Coleoptera
- Suborder: Polyphaga
- Infraorder: Scarabaeiformia
- Family: Scarabaeidae
- Genus: Hyposerica
- Species: H. castanipes

Binomial name
- Hyposerica castanipes Brenske, 1899

Species of beetle

Hyposerica castanipes is a species of beetle of the family Scarabaeidae. It is found in Madagascar.

== Description ==
Adults reach a length of about 8–9 mm. They are shiny and brown. It is similar to Hyposerica nucea, but they are somewhat more robust. Furthermore, the two deep setae are absent on the clypeus and the frons is somewhat wrinkled. The elytra, in particular, differ in that they are finely shagreened and densely punctate. The suture is flat and the 2nd, 4th, and 6th costa are very faintly indicated as narrow, smooth, barely raised striae, while the others are entirely absent.
