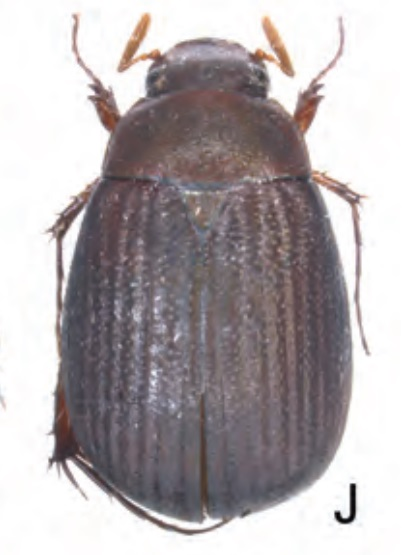

Scientific classification
- Kingdom: Animalia
- Phylum: Arthropoda
- Class: Insecta
- Order: Coleoptera
- Suborder: Polyphaga
- Infraorder: Scarabaeiformia
- Family: Scarabaeidae
- Genus: Neoserica
- Species: N. pseudomajor

Binomial name
- Neoserica pseudomajor Ahrens & Fabrizi, 2016

= Neoserica pseudomajor =

Species of beetle

Neoserica pseudomajor is a species of beetle of the family Scarabaeidae. It is found in India (Meghalaya).

== Description ==
Adults reach a length of about 8.8–10 mm. They have a dark brown, oval body. The antennae are yellowish brown and the ventral surface is reddish brown. The dorsal surface is dull and nearly glabrous.

== Etymology ==
The species name is derived from Greek pseudo (meaning false) and the species name major (meaning greater) and refers to its similarity to Aserica major.
