= Hyposerica fuliginosa =

Scientific classification
- Kingdom: Animalia
- Phylum: Arthropoda
- Class: Insecta
- Order: Coleoptera
- Suborder: Polyphaga
- Infraorder: Scarabaeiformia
- Family: Scarabaeidae
- Genus: Hyposerica
- Species: H. fuliginosa

Binomial name
- Hyposerica fuliginosa Lacroix, 1994

Species of beetle

Hyposerica fuliginosa is a species of beetle of the family Scarabaeidae. It is found on the Comoros.

== Description ==
Adults reach a length of about 10 mm. They are very similar to Hyposerica porphyrea, but the clypeus has a straighter anterior margin and more oblique sides. Also, the surface is very densely punctured, with a granular appearance.
