= Hyposerica inflata =

Scientific classification
- Kingdom: Animalia
- Phylum: Arthropoda
- Class: Insecta
- Order: Coleoptera
- Suborder: Polyphaga
- Infraorder: Scarabaeiformia
- Family: Scarabaeidae
- Genus: Hyposerica
- Species: H. inflata

Binomial name
- Hyposerica inflata (Fairmaire, 1898)

Synonyms
- Serica inflata Fairmaire, 1898

Species of beetle

Hyposerica inflata is a species of beetle of the family Scarabaeidae. It is found in Madagascar.

== Description ==
Adults reach a length of about 10 mm. They are similar to Hyposerica grossa, but more refined, smaller and more finely punctuated.
