= Neoserica ponderosa =

Scientific classification
- Kingdom: Animalia
- Phylum: Arthropoda
- Class: Insecta
- Order: Coleoptera
- Suborder: Polyphaga
- Infraorder: Scarabaeiformia
- Family: Scarabaeidae
- Genus: Neoserica
- Species: N. ponderosa

Binomial name
- Neoserica ponderosa (Arrow, 1946)

Synonyms
- Serica ponderosa Arrow, 1946

Species of beetle

Neoserica ponderosa is a species of beetle of the family Scarabaeidae. It is found in Myanmar.
