= Hyposerica defloccata =

Scientific classification
- Kingdom: Animalia
- Phylum: Arthropoda
- Class: Insecta
- Order: Coleoptera
- Suborder: Polyphaga
- Infraorder: Scarabaeiformia
- Family: Scarabaeidae
- Genus: Hyposerica
- Species: H. defloccata

Binomial name
- Hyposerica defloccata Brenske, 1899

Species of beetle

Hyposerica defloccata is a species of beetle of the family Scarabaeidae. It is found in Madagascar.

== Description ==
Adults reach a length of about 9.4 mm. They are brown underneath, dark above and dull without opalescent sheen. In shape, they are very similar to Hyposerica goudoti, however, the hind angles of the pronotum are not broadly rounded. The clypeus is broad, somewhat more densely punctate laterally than on the slightly convex middle. The setae behind the anterior margin are distinct, those in front of the suture barely noticeable. The suture strongly is curved posteriorly. The pronotum is transverse, the lateral margin is even less rounded, and the hind angles are angular. The elytra are finely punctate without a raised suture or ribs, but there are three narrow, unpunctate striae, each bordered by two parallel rows of punctures, without any elevation; here, too, only weak setae are present at the margin. The pygidium is flat and rounded at the apex.
