= Dicranocnemus hypocrita =

Scientific classification
- Kingdom: Animalia
- Phylum: Arthropoda
- Class: Insecta
- Order: Coleoptera
- Suborder: Polyphaga
- Infraorder: Scarabaeiformia
- Family: Scarabaeidae
- Genus: Dicranocnemus
- Species: D. hypocrita

Binomial name
- Dicranocnemus hypocrita Péringuey, 1902

Species of beetle

Dicranocnemus hypocrita is a species of beetle of the family Scarabaeidae. It is found in South Africa (Western Cape).

== Description ==
Adults reach a length of about 4 mm (0.16 in). Males are similar to Dicranocnemus pulcher, but a little shorter. The pronotum is briefly villose, and has a similar basal lateral patch of squamose flavescent hairs and a fine line of yellow scales filling also part of the median groove. The elytra only have two bands of bright yellow scales uniting in the median part and the sutural patch, the scales of which are whitish, is connected with the scaly apical part by a narrow line of scales, these scales leave thus three hairless places on each side. The pygidial part and abdomen are clothed with dense, golden-yellow scales. The legs are rufescent and villose. Females are similar to males, but with the hair-like scales on the elytra more scattered or less plainly banded, and the sutural whitish patch is indistinct.
