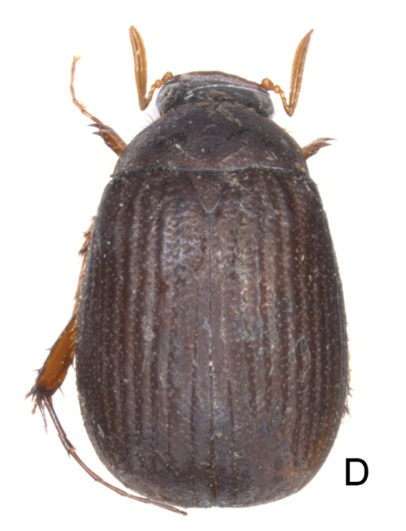

Scientific classification
- Kingdom: Animalia
- Phylum: Arthropoda
- Class: Insecta
- Order: Coleoptera
- Suborder: Polyphaga
- Infraorder: Scarabaeiformia
- Family: Scarabaeidae
- Genus: Neoserica
- Species: N. minor

Binomial name
- Neoserica minor (Arrow, 1946)

Synonyms
- Aserica minor Arrow, 1946

= Neoserica minor =

Species of beetle

Neoserica minor is a species of beetle of the family Scarabaeidae. It is found in Myanmar and China (Yunnan).

== Description ==
Adults reach a length of about 7.2 mm. They have a black to dark brown, short-oval body. The antennae are yellow and the dorsal surface (except for the labroclypeus) is dull. The pronotum and elytra are glabrous.
