= Dinamoraza vinsoni =

Scientific classification
- Kingdom: Animalia
- Phylum: Arthropoda
- Clade: Pancrustacea
- Class: Insecta
- Order: Coleoptera
- Suborder: Polyphaga
- Infraorder: Scarabaeiformia
- Family: Scarabaeidae
- Genus: Dinamoraza
- Species: D. vinsoni

Binomial name
- Dinamoraza vinsoni (Arrow, 1948)

Synonyms
- Lachnosterna vinsoni Arrow, 1948

Species of beetle

Dinamoraza vinsoni is a species of beetle of the family Scarabaeidae. It is found on Mauritius.

== Description ==
Adults reach a length of about 21–24 mm. They are flavous, with the upper surface rufescent and pruinose in males, but pale and shining in females. The metasternum is closely clothed with pale hair, the pronotum decorated with dark marks consisting of an oblique line on each side of the middle and one or two small spots near the lateral margin. The head of the males is dark.
