= Hyposerica flavicornis =

Scientific classification
- Kingdom: Animalia
- Phylum: Arthropoda
- Clade: Pancrustacea
- Class: Insecta
- Order: Coleoptera
- Suborder: Polyphaga
- Infraorder: Scarabaeiformia
- Family: Scarabaeidae
- Genus: Hyposerica
- Species: H. flavicornis

Binomial name
- Hyposerica flavicornis Arrow, 1948

Species of beetle

Hyposerica flavicornis is a species of beetle of the family Scarabaeidae. It is found on Mauritius.

== Description ==
Adults reach a length of about 7.5–8.5 mm. They are very dark brown, with most of the head and the pronotum almost black, while the legs and antennae are light testaceous.
