= Stereomera =

Scientific classification
- Kingdom: Animalia
- Phylum: Arthropoda
- Clade: Pancrustacea
- Class: Insecta
- Order: Coleoptera
- Suborder: Polyphaga
- Infraorder: Scarabaeiformia
- Family: Scarabaeidae
- Subfamily: Aphodiinae
- Tribe: Stereomerini
- Genus: Stereomera; Arrow, 1905

Genus of beetles

Stereomera is a genus of beetles of the family Scarabaeidae.

== Species ==
- Stereomera masumotoi Maruyama & Nomura, 2011
- Stereomera pusilla Arrow, 1905
