= Hyposerica vinsoni =

Scientific classification
- Kingdom: Animalia
- Phylum: Arthropoda
- Clade: Pancrustacea
- Class: Insecta
- Order: Coleoptera
- Suborder: Polyphaga
- Infraorder: Scarabaeiformia
- Family: Scarabaeidae
- Genus: Hyposerica
- Species: H. vinsoni

Binomial name
- Hyposerica vinsoni Arrow, 1948

Species of beetle

Hyposerica vinsoni is a species of beetle of the family Scarabaeidae. It is found on Mauritius.

== Description ==
Adults reach a length of about 12–13 mm. They are black or very dark reddish black, smooth and shining above and beneath, with the legs and lower surface deep red.
