= Schizonycha pygidialis =

Scientific classification
- Kingdom: Animalia
- Phylum: Arthropoda
- Clade: Pancrustacea
- Class: Insecta
- Order: Coleoptera
- Suborder: Polyphaga
- Infraorder: Scarabaeiformia
- Family: Scarabaeidae
- Genus: Schizonycha
- Species: S. pygidialis

Binomial name
- Schizonycha pygidialis Arrow, 1944

Species of beetle

Schizonycha pygidialis is a species of beetle of the family Scarabaeidae. It is found in Saudi Arabia and Yemen.

== Description ==
Adults reach a length of about 13.5–17 mm (0.53–0.67 in). They have a cylindrical, moderately elongate, dark red body, with the head and pronotum almost black. They are very shiny above and beneath. They are thinly covered at the sides, on the underside with pale setae and above with very tiny setae.
