= Hyposerica submetallica =

Scientific classification
- Kingdom: Animalia
- Phylum: Arthropoda
- Clade: Pancrustacea
- Class: Insecta
- Order: Coleoptera
- Suborder: Polyphaga
- Infraorder: Scarabaeiformia
- Family: Scarabaeidae
- Genus: Hyposerica
- Species: H. submetallica

Binomial name
- Hyposerica submetallica Arrow, 1948

Species of beetle

Hyposerica submetallica is a species of beetle of the family Scarabaeidae. It is found on Mauritius.

== Description ==
Adults reach a length of about 7–8 mm. They are dark brown or reddish black, with a slight metallic suffusion, sometimes hardly visible on the elytra, which may be lighter in colour than the rest of the upper surface. The antennae are red.

== Life history ==
Both adults and larvae have been recorded from fields of sugar cane.
