= Hyposerica pexicollis =

Scientific classification
- Kingdom: Animalia
- Phylum: Arthropoda
- Class: Insecta
- Order: Coleoptera
- Suborder: Polyphaga
- Infraorder: Scarabaeiformia
- Family: Scarabaeidae
- Genus: Hyposerica
- Species: H. pexicollis

Binomial name
- Hyposerica pexicollis (Fairmaire, 1897)

Synonyms
- Serica pexicollis Fairmaire, 1897

Species of beetle

Hyposerica pexicollis is a species of beetle of the family Scarabaeidae. It is found in Madagascar.

== Description ==
Adults reach a length of about 9 mm. They are shiny, smooth with a darker head and pronotum, the latter densely wrinkled and punctate (making it most similar to Hyposerica pierroni), the elytra are also strongly wrinkled and punctate, each with four weak ribs.
