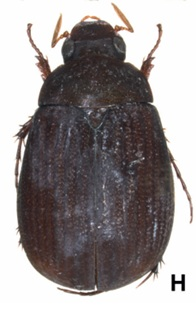

Scientific classification
- Kingdom: Animalia
- Phylum: Arthropoda
- Class: Insecta
- Order: Coleoptera
- Suborder: Polyphaga
- Infraorder: Scarabaeiformia
- Family: Scarabaeidae
- Genus: Neoserica
- Species: N. paramajor

Binomial name
- Neoserica paramajor Ahrens, Fabrizi & Liu, 2019

= Neoserica paramajor =

Species of beetle

Neoserica paramajor is a species of beetle of the family Scarabaeidae. It is found in China (Guangdong, Hubei, Hunan, Jiangxi, Yunnan).

== Description ==
Adults reach a length of about 7.9–9.1 mm. They have a dark reddish brown, oblong body. The antennal club is yellowish brown, the dorsal surface is dull and nearly glabrous and the labroclypeus is shiny.

== Etymology ==
The name of this species is based on the combined Greek prefix para- (meaning close to) and the species name major, with reference of its similarity to Neoserica major.
