= Maladera pubescens =

Scientific classification
- Kingdom: Animalia
- Phylum: Arthropoda
- Class: Insecta
- Order: Coleoptera
- Suborder: Polyphaga
- Infraorder: Scarabaeiformia
- Family: Scarabaeidae
- Genus: Maladera
- Species: M. pubescens

Binomial name
- Maladera pubescens (Arrow, 1916)

Synonyms
- Autoserica pubescens Arrow, 1916

Species of beetle

Maladera pubescens is a species of beetle of the family Scarabaeidae. It is found in southern India and Sri Lanka.

== Description ==
Adults reach a length of about 6.6 mm. They have a reddish brown, short oval body, with yellow antennae. The dorsal surface is shiny and densely finely setose.
