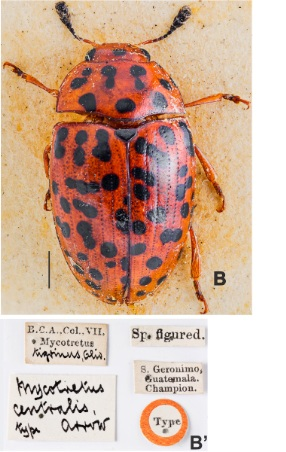

Scientific classification
- Kingdom: Animalia
- Phylum: Arthropoda
- Class: Insecta
- Order: Coleoptera
- Suborder: Polyphaga
- Infraorder: Cucujiformia
- Family: Erotylidae
- Genus: Mycotretus
- Species: M. centralis

Binomial name
- Mycotretus centralis Arrow, 1909

= Mycotretus centralis =

Species of beetle

Mycotretus centralis is a species of beetle of the Erotylidae family. This species is found in Mexico, Guatemala and southern and southeastern Brazil.
