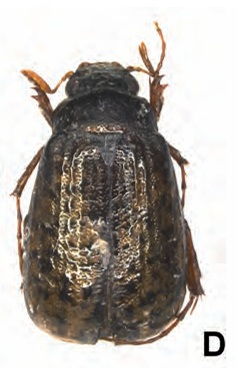

Scientific classification
- Kingdom: Animalia
- Phylum: Arthropoda
- Class: Insecta
- Order: Coleoptera
- Suborder: Polyphaga
- Infraorder: Scarabaeiformia
- Family: Scarabaeidae
- Genus: Serica
- Species: S. scutellaris

Binomial name
- Serica scutellaris Arrow, 1946

= Serica scutellaris =

Species of beetle

Serica scutellaris is a species of beetle of the family Scarabaeidae. It is found in Myanmar.

== Description ==
Adults reach a length of about 7.3–8.4 mm. They have a brown, oval-elongate body. The antennae, legs and elytra are yellowish brown, the latter with numerous small, irregular dark spots. The dorsal surface is shiny and the head is sparsely setose. The dorsal face of the pronotum and elytra is almost glabrous.
