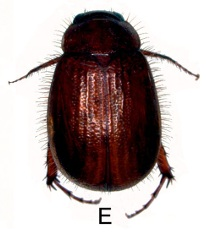

Scientific classification
- Kingdom: Animalia
- Phylum: Arthropoda
- Class: Insecta
- Order: Coleoptera
- Suborder: Polyphaga
- Infraorder: Scarabaeiformia
- Family: Scarabaeidae
- Genus: Selaserica
- Species: S. pusilla

Binomial name
- Selaserica pusilla Arrow, 1916

= Selaserica pusilla =

Species of beetle

Selaserica pusilla is a species of beetle of the family Scarabaeidae. It is found in Sri Lanka.

== Description ==
Adults reach a length of about 5.4–6.8 mm. They have a yellowish brown, oval body, with yellow antennae. The dorsal surface is shiny and glabrous.
