= Hyposerica abdominalis =

Scientific classification
- Kingdom: Animalia
- Phylum: Arthropoda
- Clade: Pancrustacea
- Class: Insecta
- Order: Coleoptera
- Suborder: Polyphaga
- Infraorder: Scarabaeiformia
- Family: Scarabaeidae
- Genus: Hyposerica
- Species: H. abdominalis

Binomial name
- Hyposerica abdominalis Arrow, 1948

Species of beetle

Hyposerica abdominalis is a species of beetle of the family Scarabaeidae. It is found on Mauritius.

== Description ==
Adults reach a length of about 9.5–11 mm. They are light brown, with the head, pronotum and scutellum darker (sometimes nearly black), the legs reddish, except the femora, which, as well as the antennae, are pale.
