= Hyposerica iridescens =

Scientific classification
- Kingdom: Animalia
- Phylum: Arthropoda
- Class: Insecta
- Order: Coleoptera
- Suborder: Polyphaga
- Infraorder: Scarabaeiformia
- Family: Scarabaeidae
- Genus: Hyposerica
- Species: H. iridescens

Binomial name
- Hyposerica iridescens (Nonfried, 1891)

Synonyms
- Serica iridescens Nonfried, 1891

Species of beetle

Hyposerica iridescens is a species of beetle of the family Scarabaeidae. It was described from Borneo.

== Description ==
Adults reach a length of about 7 mm. They are brown, without tomentum and vividly opalescent. The clypeus is broad, distinctly margined anteriorly and densely but weakly wrinkled-punctate with individual setae and with the suture very weak. The frons is more finely punctate with two setae. The pronotum is somewhat projecting anteriorly, evenly weakly rounded at the sides, the posterior angles broadly rounded, the posterior margin finely margined, the surface finely punctate. The elytra are not punctate in rows, and the punctures are coarse, wrinkled, and barely reveal individual narrow, incomplete, weakly raised ribs, without a raised suture.

== Taxonomy ==
Brenske considered this species to be smaller specimens of Hyposerica pruinosella from Madagascar. He believed that the country of origin (Borneo) is wrong. He did not however, formally synomyse iridescens with pruinosella.
