= Hyposerica borbonnica =

Scientific classification
- Kingdom: Animalia
- Phylum: Arthropoda
- Clade: Pancrustacea
- Class: Insecta
- Order: Coleoptera
- Suborder: Polyphaga
- Infraorder: Scarabaeiformia
- Family: Scarabaeidae
- Genus: Hyposerica
- Species: H. borbonnica

Binomial name
- Hyposerica borbonnica Arrow, 1948

Species of beetle

Hyposerica borbonnica is a species of beetle of the family Scarabaeidae. It is found on La Réunion.

== Description ==
Adults reach a length of about 10 mm. They are rust red, with the lower surface, the femora and antennae a little paler.
