= Australoxenella humptydooensis =

Scientific classification
- Kingdom: Animalia
- Phylum: Arthropoda
- Clade: Pancrustacea
- Class: Insecta
- Order: Coleoptera
- Suborder: Polyphaga
- Infraorder: Scarabaeiformia
- Family: Scarabaeidae
- Genus: Australoxenella
- Species: A. humptydooensis

Binomial name
- Australoxenella humptydooensis Howden & Storey, 1992

Species of beetle

Australoxenella humptydooensis is a species of beetle of the family Scarabaeidae. It is found in Australia (Northern Territory).

== Description ==
Adults reach a length of about 2.2–2.6 mm (0.087–0.102 in). They are dark reddish brown dorsally and ventrally.

== Life history ==
Specimens have been collected in open and closed forest habitats.
