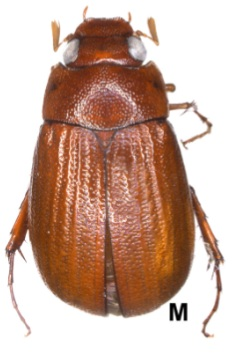

Scientific classification
- Kingdom: Animalia
- Phylum: Arthropoda
- Class: Insecta
- Order: Coleoptera
- Suborder: Polyphaga
- Infraorder: Scarabaeiformia
- Family: Scarabaeidae
- Genus: Selaserica
- Species: S. hosanagarana

Binomial name
- Selaserica hosanagarana Sreedevi, Ranasinghe, Fabrizi & Ahrens, 2019

= Selaserica hosanagarana =

Species of beetle

Selaserica hosanagarana is a species of beetle of the family Scarabaeidae. It is found in India (Karnataka).

== Description ==
Adults reach a length of about 7.9–8.3 mm. They have a reddish brown, oval body, with yellow antennae. The dorsal surface is glabrous and shiny.

== Etymology ==
The species name refers to the type locality, Hosanagara.
