= Dicranocnemus mendicus =

Scientific classification
- Kingdom: Animalia
- Phylum: Arthropoda
- Class: Insecta
- Order: Coleoptera
- Suborder: Polyphaga
- Infraorder: Scarabaeiformia
- Family: Scarabaeidae
- Genus: Dicranocnemus
- Species: D. mendicus

Binomial name
- Dicranocnemus mendicus Péringuey, 1902

Species of beetle

Dicranocnemus mendicus is a species of beetle of the family Scarabaeidae. It is found in South Africa (Eastern Cape).

== Description ==
Adults reach a length of about 4.25–4.5 mm (0.167–0.177 in). Males are black, with the elytra reddish brown. The pronotum is clothed with a sub-appressed squamose pubescence turning to flavescent scales on the whole of the posterior half. The longitudinal furrow is very distinct. The scutellum is densely scaly, with the scales somewhat pallid. The elytra are entirely clothed with flavescent ovate scales, bi-costulate and having in each interval, on each side, a somewhat distinct band of paler scales, the scales of the sutural patch are also of the same colour. The scales on the pygidial part and abdomen are similar in colour to those on the background of the elytra. Females have the pronotum clothed with a short, non-squamose pubescence, and without scales. The elytra are less distinctly costulate, and covered like the scutellum with greyish, sub-squamose appressed hairs. The scales on the pygidial part and abdomen are similar to those of the males, but a little less closely set on the pygidium.
