= Tanyproctoides =

Scientific classification
- Kingdom: Animalia
- Phylum: Arthropoda
- Class: Insecta
- Order: Coleoptera
- Suborder: Polyphaga
- Infraorder: Scarabaeiformia
- Family: Scarabaeidae
- Subfamily: Melolonthinae
- Tribe: Tanyproctini
- Genus: Tanyproctoides; Petrovitz, 1971

Genus of leaf beetles

Tanyproctoides is a genus of beetles belonging to the family Scarabaeidae.

== Species ==
- Subgenus Odontiellus Keith & Montreuil, 2004
  - Tanyproctoides freyi (Petrovitz, 1968)
  - Tanyproctoides gormicus Montreuil & Keith, 2014
  - Tanyproctoides mirzayansinus Keith & Montreuil, 2004
  - Tanyproctoides silfverbergi Keith, 2002
- Subgenus Tanyproctoides
  - Tanyproctoides arabicus (Arrow, 1932)
