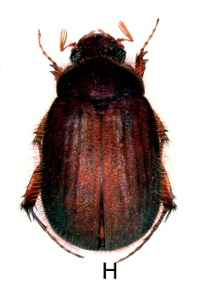

Scientific classification
- Kingdom: Animalia
- Phylum: Arthropoda
- Class: Insecta
- Order: Coleoptera
- Suborder: Polyphaga
- Infraorder: Scarabaeiformia
- Family: Scarabaeidae
- Genus: Selaserica
- Species: S. meridionalis

Binomial name
- Selaserica meridionalis Fabrizi & Ahrens, 2014

= Selaserica meridionalis =

Species of beetle

Selaserica meridionalis is a species of beetle of the family Scarabaeidae. It is found in southern India and Sri Lanka.

== Description ==
Adults reach a length of about 7.4–8.8 mm. They have a dark reddish brown, oval body, with yellowish brown antennae. The dorsal surface (except the head) is dull and densely covered with erect, long setae.

== Etymology ==
The species name refers to its occurrence in the southern Indian subcontinent.
