= Dicranocnemus hirtipes =

Scientific classification
- Kingdom: Animalia
- Phylum: Arthropoda
- Class: Insecta
- Order: Coleoptera
- Suborder: Polyphaga
- Infraorder: Scarabaeiformia
- Family: Scarabaeidae
- Genus: Dicranocnemus
- Species: D. hirtipes

Binomial name
- Dicranocnemus hirtipes Schein, 1958

Species of beetle

Dicranocnemus hirtipes is a species of beetle of the family Scarabaeidae. It is found in South Africa (Western Cape).

== Description ==
Adults reach a length of about 5–6 mm (0.20–0.24 in). They are black, with brownish-black elytra with a yellow scale pattern. They have long bushy hairs on the hind tibiae and tarsi.
