= Australoxenella concinna =

Scientific classification
- Kingdom: Animalia
- Phylum: Arthropoda
- Clade: Pancrustacea
- Class: Insecta
- Order: Coleoptera
- Suborder: Polyphaga
- Infraorder: Scarabaeiformia
- Family: Scarabaeidae
- Genus: Australoxenella
- Species: A. concinna

Binomial name
- Australoxenella concinna Storey & Howden, 1996

Species of beetle

Australoxenella concinna is a species of beetle of the family Scarabaeidae. It is found in Australia (Queensland).

== Description ==
Adults reach a length of about 2.9 mm (0.11 in). They are reddish-brown dorsally and ventrally.

== Etymology ==
The name of the species refers to its beautiful appearance.
