= Hyposerica subrugipennis =

Scientific classification
- Kingdom: Animalia
- Phylum: Arthropoda
- Clade: Pancrustacea
- Class: Insecta
- Order: Coleoptera
- Suborder: Polyphaga
- Infraorder: Scarabaeiformia
- Family: Scarabaeidae
- Genus: Hyposerica
- Species: H. subrugipennis

Binomial name
- Hyposerica subrugipennis Moser, 1911

Species of beetle

Hyposerica subrugipennis is a species of beetle of the family Scarabaeidae. It is found in Madagascar.

== Description ==
Adults reach a length of about 5–6 mm. They are shiny and black with brown legs, or entirely brown. The head is sparsely but strongly punctured. The pronotum has individual erect hairs on the sides and on the disc and the elytra have two rows of strong punctures in the striae, while the narrow, slightly protruding intervals are smooth. Because the punctures are coarse and the rows somewhat irregular, the elytra appear weakly wrinkled. The elytra also have individual hairs laterally.
