= Hyposerica strenua =

Scientific classification
- Kingdom: Animalia
- Phylum: Arthropoda
- Class: Insecta
- Order: Coleoptera
- Suborder: Polyphaga
- Infraorder: Scarabaeiformia
- Family: Scarabaeidae
- Genus: Hyposerica
- Species: H. strenua

Binomial name
- Hyposerica strenua Brenske, 1899

Species of beetle

Hyposerica strenua is a species of beetle of the family Scarabaeidae. It is found in Madagascar.

== Description ==
Adults reach a length of about 5.5–7 mm. They are chestnut brown and glossy, with the elytra yellowish and the pronotum very finely punctate, margined posteriorly. The clypeus is less broad, highly margined anteriorly, very slightly indented, deeply punctate with individual setae, the frons very finely punctate, in males the head is somewhat broader and the eyes are larger. The pronotum is projecting anteriorly, scarcely rounded laterally, the posterior angles slightly rounded, very finely punctate. The elytra are almost uniformly, somewhat more strongly punctate, without distinct longitudinal lines, the main ribs are only weakly indicated, a distinct longitudinal line is found next to the suture. The pygidium is convex, rounded and finely punctate.
