= Selaserica praetexta =

Scientific classification
- Kingdom: Animalia
- Phylum: Arthropoda
- Class: Insecta
- Order: Coleoptera
- Suborder: Polyphaga
- Infraorder: Scarabaeiformia
- Family: Scarabaeidae
- Genus: Selaserica
- Species: S. praetexta

Binomial name
- Selaserica praetexta Fabrizi & Ahrens, 2014

Species of beetle

Selaserica praetexta is a species of beetle of the family Scarabaeidae. It is found in Sri Lanka.

== Description ==
Adults reach a length of about 7-8.5 mm. They have a reddish brown, oval body, with yellow antennae. The dorsal surface is shiny and glabrous, with some setae on the elytra.

== Etymology ==
The species name is derived from Latin praetex (meaning with ornaments).
