= Hyposerica orbiculata =

Scientific classification
- Kingdom: Animalia
- Phylum: Arthropoda
- Class: Insecta
- Order: Coleoptera
- Suborder: Polyphaga
- Infraorder: Scarabaeiformia
- Family: Scarabaeidae
- Genus: Hyposerica
- Species: H. orbiculata

Binomial name
- Hyposerica orbiculata Lacroix, 1994

Species of beetle

Hyposerica orbiculata is a species of beetle of the family Scarabaeidae. It is found on the Comoros.

== Description ==
Adults reach a length of about 7 mm. They have a very short, oval body. The upper surface is reddish with strong iridescent reflections.
