= Dicranocnemus squamosus =

Scientific classification
- Kingdom: Animalia
- Phylum: Arthropoda
- Class: Insecta
- Order: Coleoptera
- Suborder: Polyphaga
- Infraorder: Scarabaeiformia
- Family: Scarabaeidae
- Genus: Dicranocnemus
- Species: D. squamosus

Binomial name
- Dicranocnemus squamosus Burmeister, 1844

Species of beetle

Dicranocnemus squamosus is a species of beetle of the family Scarabaeidae. It is found in South Africa (Eastern Cape, Western Cape).

== Description ==
Adults reach a length of about 4–5.25 mm (0.157–0.207 in). Males are black, with the elytra testaceous red. The pronotum is clothed with a very dense, long, flavescent pubescence, and has a somewhat broad band of appressed squamose scales along the base. The scutellum is densely squamose and the elytra is bi-costulate and either completely covered with round, golden-yellow scales set close to each other or forming two bands of scales on the disk and above the outer margin, and the interrupted sutural one, the median patch of which is occasionally paler than the other scales. The pygidial part and the abdomen are densely scaly, with the scales a little lighter yellow than those on the upper side. The legs are piceous. Females are similar to males, but a little smaller, and the scales on the elytra are replaced by squamose flavescent hairs, and the elytra are darker brown.
