= Hyposerica piceonigra =

Scientific classification
- Kingdom: Animalia
- Phylum: Arthropoda
- Clade: Pancrustacea
- Class: Insecta
- Order: Coleoptera
- Suborder: Polyphaga
- Infraorder: Scarabaeiformia
- Family: Scarabaeidae
- Genus: Hyposerica
- Species: H. piceonigra

Binomial name
- Hyposerica piceonigra Moser, 1915

Species of beetle

Hyposerica piceonigra is a species of beetle of the family Scarabaeidae. It is found in Madagascar.

== Description ==
Adults reach a length of about 7-7.5 mm. They are blackish-brown above and somewhat lighter below. They are mostly shiny, but the sides of the thorax, the hind coxae and the abdomen are dull. The frons is widely covered with strong punctures and the antennae are yellow. The pronotum is moderately densely and strongly punctured, a few punctures with setae. The lateral margins are setate. The elytra are slightly longitudinally furrowed, these furrows dotted with rows of punctures.
