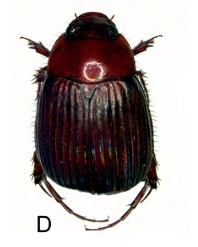

Scientific classification
- Kingdom: Animalia
- Phylum: Arthropoda
- Class: Insecta
- Order: Coleoptera
- Suborder: Polyphaga
- Infraorder: Scarabaeiformia
- Family: Scarabaeidae
- Genus: Selaserica
- Species: S. lucidicollis

Binomial name
- Selaserica lucidicollis Fabrizi & Ahrens, 2014

= Selaserica lucidicollis =

Species of beetle

Selaserica lucidicollis is a species of beetle of the family Scarabaeidae. It is found in Sri Lanka.

== Description ==
Adults reach a length of about 12.7-13.4 mm. They have a dark reddish brown, oblong body, with yellowish brown antennae. The dorsal surface is dull, while the head and pronotum are shiny and nearly glabrous.

== Etymology ==
The species name is derived from Latin lucidus (meaning shiny) and collum (meaning neck) and refers to the shiny surface of the pronotum.
