= Hyposerica cinnamomea =

Scientific classification
- Kingdom: Animalia
- Phylum: Arthropoda
- Class: Insecta
- Order: Coleoptera
- Suborder: Polyphaga
- Infraorder: Scarabaeiformia
- Family: Scarabaeidae
- Genus: Hyposerica
- Species: H. cinnamomea

Binomial name
- Hyposerica cinnamomea (Klug, 1834)

Synonyms
- Serica cinnamomea Klug, 1834; Serica pisiformis Burmeister, 1855

Species of beetle

Hyposerica cinnamomea is a species of beetle of the family Scarabaeidae. It is found in Madagascar.

== Description ==
Adults reach a length of about 7 mm. They are reddish-yellow, very strongly tomentose and more opalescent below than above. The body is short and egg-shaped. The clypeus is short, broad, almost metallic, very faintly margined, finely punctate and with the suture almost angularly curved. The frons is broadly covered with individual punctures, convex and shiny before the suture. The pronotum is short, almost straight at the sides with individual fine setae, which are very indistinct, the anterior angles strongly projecting, the anterior margin scarcely projecting in the middle, the posterior angles distinctly rounded, the surface finely, not densely punctate. The scutellum is short with a broad base. The elytra are coarsely punctate in irregular rows. Because of the strong tomentose, the elytra appear completely flat. The lateral margin is only weakly setate. The pygidium is slightly pointed and densely punctate.
