= Australoxenella bathurstensis =

Scientific classification
- Kingdom: Animalia
- Phylum: Arthropoda
- Clade: Pancrustacea
- Class: Insecta
- Order: Coleoptera
- Suborder: Polyphaga
- Infraorder: Scarabaeiformia
- Family: Scarabaeidae
- Genus: Australoxenella
- Species: A. bathurstensis

Binomial name
- Australoxenella bathurstensis Howden & Storey, 1992

Species of beetle

Australoxenella bathurstensis is a species of beetle of the family Scarabaeidae. It is found in Australia (Northern Territory).

== Description ==
Adults reach a length of about 3.2 mm (0.13 in). The dorsal surface is dull brown, while the ventral surface is reddish-brown.
