= Hyposerica costata =

Scientific classification
- Kingdom: Animalia
- Phylum: Arthropoda
- Clade: Pancrustacea
- Class: Insecta
- Order: Coleoptera
- Suborder: Polyphaga
- Infraorder: Scarabaeiformia
- Family: Scarabaeidae
- Genus: Hyposerica
- Species: H. costata

Binomial name
- Hyposerica costata Moser, 1911

Species of beetle

Hyposerica costata is a species of beetle of the family Scarabaeidae. It is found in Madagascar.

== Description ==
Adults reach a length of about 8 mm. They are chestnut brown and shiny. The head is sparsely punctured, except for the smooth vertex. The punctures are coarse and have individual erect setae. The pronotum is sparsely punctured. The sides and the upper surface with individual long hairs. The elytra have two rows of strong punctures in the striae. The spaces between the striae are smooth and strongly raised. The lateral margins are weakly ciliate.
