= Dicranocnemus natalensis =

Scientific classification
- Kingdom: Animalia
- Phylum: Arthropoda
- Class: Insecta
- Order: Coleoptera
- Suborder: Polyphaga
- Infraorder: Scarabaeiformia
- Family: Scarabaeidae
- Genus: Dicranocnemus
- Species: D. natalensis

Binomial name
- Dicranocnemus natalensis Péringuey, 1902

Species of beetle

Dicranocnemus natalensis is a species of beetle of the family Scarabaeidae. It is found in South Africa (KwaZulu-Natal, Eastern Cape).

== Description ==
Adults reach a length of about 5.25–5.5 mm (0.207–0.217 in). Males are black, with the elytra very light testaceous. The antennae (with the exception of the two basal joints) are black and the head is rugose and covered with a greyish short pubescence. The pronotum is densely scabrose and clothed with a dense, somewhat long, slightly silky grey pubescence, and has only a very faint longitudinal furrow in the posterior part. The scutellum is covered with greyish round scales. The elytra are covered with small elongate, flavescent scales, which are not very closely set. The pygidial part and abdomen have dense flavescent round scales. Females are similar to males, but the scutellum and elytra have appressed greyish hairs instead of scales, and the scales on the pygidial part and the abdomen are replaced by thick appressed squamiform hairs.
