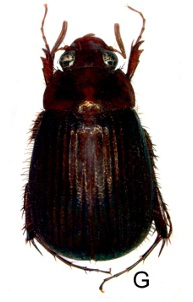

Scientific classification
- Kingdom: Animalia
- Phylum: Arthropoda
- Class: Insecta
- Order: Coleoptera
- Suborder: Polyphaga
- Infraorder: Scarabaeiformia
- Family: Scarabaeidae
- Genus: Selaserica
- Species: S. impexa

Binomial name
- Selaserica impexa Fabrizi & Ahrens, 2014

= Selaserica impexa =

Species of beetle

Selaserica impexa is a species of beetle of the family Scarabaeidae. It is found in Sri Lanka.

== Description ==
Adults reach a length of about 9.7–11.2 mm. They have an oblong body. The dorsal surface is dull and dark brown, while the ventral surface is reddish brown. The legs and antennae are yellowish brown.

== Etymology ==
The species name is derived from Latin impexus (meaning without ornaments).
