= Selaserica splendifica =

Scientific classification
- Kingdom: Animalia
- Phylum: Arthropoda
- Class: Insecta
- Order: Coleoptera
- Suborder: Polyphaga
- Infraorder: Scarabaeiformia
- Family: Scarabaeidae
- Genus: Selaserica
- Species: S. splendifica

Binomial name
- Selaserica splendifica (Brenske, 1898)

Synonyms
- Neoserica splendifica Brenske, 1898

Species of beetle

Selaserica splendifica is a species of beetle of the family Scarabaeidae. It is found in Sri Lanka.

== Description ==
Adults reach a length of about 6.2 mm. They have a yellowish brown, oval body, with yellow antennae. The dorsal surface is moderately shiny, while the elytra is partly dull with some setae.
