= Hyposerica maculata =

Scientific classification
- Kingdom: Animalia
- Phylum: Arthropoda
- Class: Insecta
- Order: Coleoptera
- Suborder: Polyphaga
- Infraorder: Scarabaeiformia
- Family: Scarabaeidae
- Genus: Hyposerica
- Species: H. maculata

Binomial name
- Hyposerica maculata Frey, 1964

Species of beetle

Hyposerica maculata is a species of beetle of the family Scarabaeidae. It is found in Madagascar.

== Description ==
Adults reach a length of about 6 mm. The upper and lower surfaces are blackish-brown, moderately glossy and strongly opalescent. The elytra have somewhat irregularly arranged rows of reddish spots. These are not very clearly defined and of varying shapes, but all approximately the same size. The pronotum and elytra are fringed with long, pale setae. A few setae are present on the pronotum and the elytra also have long, erect setae, very sparsely and irregularly arranged.
