= Australoxenella wurrook =

Scientific classification
- Kingdom: Animalia
- Phylum: Arthropoda
- Clade: Pancrustacea
- Class: Insecta
- Order: Coleoptera
- Suborder: Polyphaga
- Infraorder: Scarabaeiformia
- Family: Scarabaeidae
- Genus: Australoxenella
- Species: A. wurrook

Binomial name
- Australoxenella wurrook Storey & Howden, 1996

Species of beetle

Australoxenella wurrook is a species of beetle of the family Scarabaeidae. It is found in Australia (Northern Territory).

== Description ==
Adults reach a length of about 2.8–3.1 mm (0.11–0.12 in). They are dark reddish brown dorsally and slightly lighter ventrally.

== Etymology ==
The name of the species is the Aboriginal word for flat.
