= Hyposerica dorsalis =

Scientific classification
- Kingdom: Animalia
- Phylum: Arthropoda
- Class: Insecta
- Order: Coleoptera
- Suborder: Polyphaga
- Infraorder: Scarabaeiformia
- Family: Scarabaeidae
- Genus: Hyposerica
- Species: H. dorsalis

Binomial name
- Hyposerica dorsalis Frey, 1968

Species of beetle

Hyposerica dorsalis is a species of beetle of the family Scarabaeidae. It is found in Madagascar.

== Description ==
Adults reach a length of about 5 mm. The upper and lower surfaces are brown and shiny, with the pronotum slightly darker than the elytra. The upper surface is smooth, with only sparse setae along the margins, and the elytral margin is slightly ciliate. The underside is very sparsely covered with somewhat erect setae.
