= Dicranocnemus squamulatus =

Scientific classification
- Kingdom: Animalia
- Phylum: Arthropoda
- Class: Insecta
- Order: Coleoptera
- Suborder: Polyphaga
- Infraorder: Scarabaeiformia
- Family: Scarabaeidae
- Genus: Dicranocnemus
- Species: D. squamulatus

Binomial name
- Dicranocnemus squamulatus Burmeister, 1844

Species of beetle

Dicranocnemus squamulatus is a species of beetle of the family Scarabaeidae. It is found in South Africa (Eastern Cape).

== Description ==
Adults reach a length of about 4–5 mm (0.16–0.20 in). Males are black, with the elytra light testaceous and with some scattered, although nearly equi-distant, flavescent, minute, elongate scales, which are occasionally a little denser along the suture and the apical margin. The pronotum is clothed with a dense, somewhat long, greyish, slightly flavescent pubescence, and has a narrow basal line of yellow scales, which fill also partly the posterior part of the median groove. The scutellum is covered with thick squamose yellow hairs. The elytra are very slightly costulate, and the scales are more like very short hairs. The pygidial part and abdomen are clothed with very dense golden-yellow round scales. The legs are piceous red or reddish. Females are similar to males, except for the shape of the pygidium and the absence of the tooth under the intermediate claw.
