= Hyposerica delecta =

Scientific classification
- Kingdom: Animalia
- Phylum: Arthropoda
- Class: Insecta
- Order: Coleoptera
- Suborder: Polyphaga
- Infraorder: Scarabaeiformia
- Family: Scarabaeidae
- Genus: Hyposerica
- Species: H. delecta

Binomial name
- Hyposerica delecta Brenske, 1899

Species of beetle

Hyposerica delecta is a species of beetle of the family Scarabaeidae. It is found in Madagascar.

== Description ==
Adults reach a length of about 8 mm. They are very similar to Hyposerica definitiva in size, shape and colouration, but even more densely tomentose and less opalescent. The hind angles of the pronotum are less broadly rounded and the rows on the elytra are more pronounced. The clypeus is densely punctate but not wrinkled, with a slight unevenness behind the anterior margin.
