= Selaserica implicata =

Scientific classification
- Kingdom: Animalia
- Phylum: Arthropoda
- Class: Insecta
- Order: Coleoptera
- Suborder: Polyphaga
- Infraorder: Scarabaeiformia
- Family: Scarabaeidae
- Genus: Selaserica
- Species: S. implicata

Binomial name
- Selaserica implicata (Brenske, 1898)

Synonyms
- Autoserica implicata Brenske, 1898

Species of beetle

Selaserica implicata is a species of beetle of the family Scarabaeidae. It is found in Sri Lanka.

== Description ==
Adults reach a length of about 9.6 mm. They have a dark reddish brown, oblong body, with yellowish brown antennae. The dorsal surface is dull and nearly glabrous.
