= Stereomerini =

Scientific classification
- Kingdom: Animalia
- Phylum: Arthropoda
- Clade: Pancrustacea
- Class: Insecta
- Order: Coleoptera
- Suborder: Polyphaga
- Infraorder: Scarabaeiformia
- Family: Scarabaeidae
- Subfamily: Aphodiinae
- Tribe: Stereomerini; Howden & Storey, 1992

Tribe of beetles

Stereomerini is a tribe of scarab beetles in the family Scarabaeidae. There are about 10 genera and more than 20 described species in Stereomerini.

== Genera ==
These 10 genera belong to the tribe Stereomerini:

- Adebrattia Bordat & Howden, 1995 (Oriental)
- Australoxenella Howden & Storey, 1992 (Australia)
- Bruneixenus Howden & Storey, 1992 (Oriental)
- Cheleion Vardal & Forshage, 2010 (Oriental)
- Daintreeola Howden & Storey, 2000 (Australia)
- Danielssonia Bordat & Howden, 1995 (Oriental)
- Pseudostereomera Bordat & Howden, 1995 (Oriental)
- Rhinocerotopsis Maruyama, 2009 (Oriental)
- Stereomera Arrow, 1905 (Oriental)
- Termitaxis Krikken, 1970 (Neotropics)
