= Hyposerica imitans =

Scientific classification
- Kingdom: Animalia
- Phylum: Arthropoda
- Class: Insecta
- Order: Coleoptera
- Suborder: Polyphaga
- Infraorder: Scarabaeiformia
- Family: Scarabaeidae
- Genus: Hyposerica
- Species: H. imitans

Binomial name
- Hyposerica imitans Frey, 1975

Species of beetle

Hyposerica imitans is a species of beetle of the family Scarabaeidae. It is found in Madagascar.

== Description ==
Adults reach a length of about 11 mm. They have an elongate-oval body. The upper and lower surfaces are blackish-brown, dull and tomentose with a slight opalescent sheen. The pronotum and elytral margin are sparsely fringed with light brown hairs. The entire upper surface, including the head, is glabrous, except for a few scattered, solitary, erect setae. The antennae are yellowish-brown.
