= Hyposerica blanchardi =

Scientific classification
- Kingdom: Animalia
- Phylum: Arthropoda
- Class: Insecta
- Order: Coleoptera
- Suborder: Polyphaga
- Infraorder: Scarabaeiformia
- Family: Scarabaeidae
- Genus: Hyposerica
- Species: H. blanchardi

Binomial name
- Hyposerica blanchardi Brenske, 1899

Species of beetle

Hyposerica blanchardi is a species of beetle of the family Scarabaeidae. It is found in Madagascar.

== Description ==
Adults reach a length of about 6 mm. They are almost black with a strong opalescent sheen above, while the underside and legs are brown. The elytra have narrow, fine but sharp ribs, between which there are always two rows of punctures. The head is large, the clypeus broad with rounded corners, dully punctured, somewhat tuberculate. The frons is very dully punctured. The pronotum is short and broad, slightly rounded at the sides but distinctly margined, not very deeply incised anteriorly, the hind angles angular with slight rounding. The striae on the elytra are very fine but distinctly raised, yet they are less noticeable because the tomentum is very strong.
