= Hyposerica rosettae =

Scientific classification
- Kingdom: Animalia
- Phylum: Arthropoda
- Class: Insecta
- Order: Coleoptera
- Suborder: Polyphaga
- Infraorder: Scarabaeiformia
- Family: Scarabaeidae
- Genus: Hyposerica
- Species: H. rosettae

Binomial name
- Hyposerica rosettae Frey, 1975

Species of beetle

Hyposerica rosettae is a species of beetle of the family Scarabaeidae. It is found in Madagascar.

== Description ==
Adults reach a length of about 6 mm. They have a very dark reddish-brown, egg-shaped body. The upper surface is dull and tomentose, while the clypeus and frons are shiny. The upper and lower surfaces have a few, extremely scattered, erect hairs, but are otherwise glabrous. The sides of the pronotum and elytra are sparsely fringed with pale cilia. The antennae are brown.
