= Dicranocnemus andreai =

Scientific classification
- Kingdom: Animalia
- Phylum: Arthropoda
- Class: Insecta
- Order: Coleoptera
- Suborder: Polyphaga
- Infraorder: Scarabaeiformia
- Family: Scarabaeidae
- Genus: Dicranocnemus
- Species: D. andreai

Binomial name
- Dicranocnemus andreai Schein, 1958

Species of beetle

Dicranocnemus andreai is a species of beetle of the family Scarabaeidae. It is found in South Africa (Western Cape).

== Description ==
Adults reach a length of about 6–7.5 mm (0.24–0.30 in). They are black, with brown elytra and with long and erect hairs on the pronotum. The pygidial area has yellow scales and the legs are black.

== Subspecies ==
- Dicranocnemus andreai andreai (South Africa: Western Cape)
- Dicranocnemus andreai zumpti Schein, 1958 (South Africa: Western Cape)
