= Australoxenella =

Scientific classification
- Kingdom: Animalia
- Phylum: Arthropoda
- Clade: Pancrustacea
- Class: Insecta
- Order: Coleoptera
- Suborder: Polyphaga
- Infraorder: Scarabaeiformia
- Family: Scarabaeidae
- Subfamily: Aphodiinae
- Tribe: Stereomerini
- Genus: Australoxenella; Howden & Storey, 1992

Genus of beetles

Australoxenella is a genus of beetles of the family Scarabaeidae.

== Species ==
- Australoxenella bathurstensis Howden & Storey, 1992
- Australoxenella concinna Storey & Howden, 1996
- Australoxenella humptydooensis Howden & Storey, 1992
- Australoxenella kalpara Storey & Howden, 1996
- Australoxenella midgee Storey & Howden, 1996
- Australoxenella mirreen Storey & Howden, 1996
- Australoxenella moogoon Storey & Howden, 1996
- Australoxenella peckorum Storey & Howden, 1996
- Australoxenella teeta Storey & Howden, 1996
- Australoxenella wurrook Storey & Howden, 1996
- Australoxenella zborowskii Storey & Howden, 1996
