= Australoxenella kalpara =

Scientific classification
- Kingdom: Animalia
- Phylum: Arthropoda
- Clade: Pancrustacea
- Class: Insecta
- Order: Coleoptera
- Suborder: Polyphaga
- Infraorder: Scarabaeiformia
- Family: Scarabaeidae
- Genus: Australoxenella
- Species: A. kalpara

Binomial name
- Australoxenella kalpara Storey & Howden, 1996

Species of beetle

Australoxenella kalpara is a species of beetle of the family Scarabaeidae. It is found in Australia (Queensland).

== Description ==
Adults reach a length of about 2.3 mm (0.091 in). They are dark reddish brown dorsally, and slightly lighter ventrally.

== Life history ==
The habitat consists of riverine open woodlands, where mainly Melaleuca and Leptospermum species grow.

== Etymology ==
The name of the species is the Aboriginal word for bed of a river.
