= Selaserica nuwarana =

Scientific classification
- Kingdom: Animalia
- Phylum: Arthropoda
- Class: Insecta
- Order: Coleoptera
- Suborder: Polyphaga
- Infraorder: Scarabaeiformia
- Family: Scarabaeidae
- Genus: Selaserica
- Species: S. nuwarana

Binomial name
- Selaserica nuwarana Fabrizi & Ahrens, 2014

Species of beetle

Selaserica nuwarana is a species of beetle of the family Scarabaeidae. It is found in Sri Lanka.

== Description ==
Adults reach a length of about 9.4–10.9 mm. They have a reddish brown, oblong body, with yellowish brown antennae. The dorsal surface is moderately shiny and nearly glabrous except for some long, fine setae on the elytra.

== Etymology ==
The species is named after its type locality, Nuwara Eliya.
