= Hyposerica truncatipennis =

Scientific classification
- Kingdom: Animalia
- Phylum: Arthropoda
- Clade: Pancrustacea
- Class: Insecta
- Order: Coleoptera
- Suborder: Polyphaga
- Infraorder: Scarabaeiformia
- Family: Scarabaeidae
- Genus: Hyposerica
- Species: H. truncatipennis

Binomial name
- Hyposerica truncatipennis Moser, 1915

Species of beetle

Hyposerica truncatipennis is a species of beetle of the family Scarabaeidae. It is found in Madagascar.

== Description ==
Adults reach a length of about 8–9 mm. The head has scattered setae and the frons is moderately densely punctate. The antennae are brown. The pronotum is finely and rather densely punctate, with fine setae on the anterior margin and on the lateral margins, and some are also noticeable on the disc. The elytra are rather densely, irregularly punctate and have longitudinal rows of widely spaced fine setae. The narrow ribs are only very faintly indicated.
