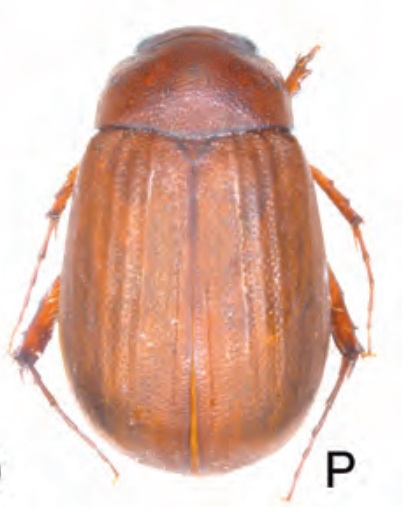

Scientific classification
- Kingdom: Animalia
- Phylum: Arthropoda
- Class: Insecta
- Order: Coleoptera
- Suborder: Polyphaga
- Infraorder: Scarabaeiformia
- Family: Scarabaeidae
- Genus: Selaserica
- Species: S. karnatakaensis

Binomial name
- Selaserica karnatakaensis Ahrens & Fabrizi, 2016

= Selaserica karnatakaensis =

Species of beetle

Selaserica karnatakaensis is a species of beetle of the family Scarabaeidae. It is found in India (Karnataka).

== Description ==
Adults reach a length of about 7.9 mm. They have a reddish brown, oval body. The antennae are yellow and the dorsal surface is glabrous and dull with an iridescent shine.

== Etymology ==
The species name refers to its occurrence in Karnataka.
