= Dicranocnemus nudus =

Scientific classification
- Kingdom: Animalia
- Phylum: Arthropoda
- Class: Insecta
- Order: Coleoptera
- Suborder: Polyphaga
- Infraorder: Scarabaeiformia
- Family: Scarabaeidae
- Genus: Dicranocnemus
- Species: D. nudus

Binomial name
- Dicranocnemus nudus Schein, 1958

Species of beetle

Dicranocnemus nudus is a species of beetle of the family Scarabaeidae. It is found in South Africa (Western Cape).

== Description ==
Adults reach a length of about 4.5 mm (0.18 in). They are black, with yellowish-brown elytra without markings. The propygidium has whitish-yellow hairs, and the pygidium is very thinly covered with dust-like, light scales.
