= Dicranocnemus pulcher =

Scientific classification
- Kingdom: Animalia
- Phylum: Arthropoda
- Class: Insecta
- Order: Coleoptera
- Suborder: Polyphaga
- Infraorder: Scarabaeiformia
- Family: Scarabaeidae
- Genus: Dicranocnemus
- Species: D. pulcher

Binomial name
- Dicranocnemus pulcher Péringuey, 1902

Species of beetle

Dicranocnemus pulcher is a species of beetle of the family Scarabaeidae. It is found in South Africa (Western Cape, Eastern Cape).

== Description ==
Adults reach a length of about 5–5.5 mm (0.20–0.22 in). Males are similar in shape and vestiture to Dicranocnemus sulcicollis, but the shape of the clypeus is different and the median groove of the pronotum is not so deep, and the pubescence is shorter. Also, the scales are not so golden yellow, and those on the scutellum and the median part of the discoidal band, and also on the post-scutellary patch, are slightly whitish. Females are shaped like the males, but the pronotum is covered with a densely dark pubescence turning to bright fulvous on the sides, and the furrow is filled with a narrow, similar band. The elytra are covered with a chocolate tomentum, and the bands of scales and also the post-scutellary patch are very slender.
