= Hyposerica humbloti =

Scientific classification
- Kingdom: Animalia
- Phylum: Arthropoda
- Class: Insecta
- Order: Coleoptera
- Suborder: Polyphaga
- Infraorder: Scarabaeiformia
- Family: Scarabaeidae
- Genus: Hyposerica
- Species: H. humbloti

Binomial name
- Hyposerica humbloti Brenske, 1899

Species of beetle

Hyposerica humbloti is a species of beetle of the family Scarabaeidae. It is found in Madagascar.

== Description ==
Adults reach a length of about 9 mm. They are very similar to Hyposerica delibuta, but the sides of the pronotum are more strongly curved posteriorly, the clypeus is somewhat shorter and the hind femora are equally narrow to the apex. The clypeus is more distinctly cracked, less wrinkled-punctate, distinctly margined anteriorly, with individual large, flat, smooth punctures laterally. The frons is finely, densely punctured, with two setae at the suture. The pronotum is even narrower than in H. delibuta, the hind angles protrude at right angles due to the stronger bulging at the sides and the surface is finely punctured with isolated weak setae at the anterior margin. The elytra are dull-punctate, very weakly striated, with few setae and a distinct transverse ridge before the apex. The pygidium is very finely punctured and the abdomen is almost smooth.
