= Tanyproctoides gormicus =

Scientific classification
- Kingdom: Animalia
- Phylum: Arthropoda
- Clade: Pancrustacea
- Class: Insecta
- Order: Coleoptera
- Suborder: Polyphaga
- Infraorder: Scarabaeiformia
- Family: Scarabaeidae
- Genus: Tanyproctoides
- Species: T. gormicus

Binomial name
- Tanyproctoides gormicus Montreuil & Keith, 2014

Species of beetle

Tanyproctoides gormicus is a species of beetle of the family Scarabaeidae. It is found in Iran.

== Description ==
Adults reach a length of about 11.5–12.5 mm. They are brownish-yellow, with a brownish-red head and with the outer margin of the protibiae darkened. They also have whitish hairs.

== Etymology ==
The species is named after its type locality, the island of Gorm.
