= Hyposerica sericeomicans =

Scientific classification
- Kingdom: Animalia
- Phylum: Arthropoda
- Clade: Pancrustacea
- Class: Insecta
- Order: Coleoptera
- Suborder: Polyphaga
- Infraorder: Scarabaeiformia
- Family: Scarabaeidae
- Genus: Hyposerica
- Species: H. sericeomicans

Binomial name
- Hyposerica sericeomicans Moser, 1915

Species of beetle

Hyposerica sericeomicans is a species of beetle of the family Scarabaeidae. It is found in Madagascar.

== Description ==
Adults reach a length of about 10.5 mm. They have a reddish-brown, oblong-oval body, with the head and pronotum somewhat darker. They are silky-shimmering and slightly opalescent above and dull below, except for the middle of the thorax and the legs. The frons is widely punctured and has a few setae behind the suture. The antennae are reddish-yellow. The pronotum is moderately densely punctured with setate lateral margins. The elytra are covered with irregular rows of punctures in the striae. The spaces along the sides of the elytra are marked by narrow, almost unpunctured ribs.
