= Selaserica distincticornis =

Scientific classification
- Kingdom: Animalia
- Phylum: Arthropoda
- Class: Insecta
- Order: Coleoptera
- Suborder: Polyphaga
- Infraorder: Scarabaeiformia
- Family: Scarabaeidae
- Genus: Selaserica
- Species: S. distincticornis

Binomial name
- Selaserica distincticornis (Brenske, 1898)

Synonyms
- Serica distincticornis Brenske, 1898

Species of beetle

Selaserica distincticornis is a species of beetle of the family Scarabaeidae. It is found in Sri Lanka.

== Description ==
Adults reach a length of about 6.7–6.8 mm. They have a dark reddish brown, oval body, with yellow antennae. The dorsal surface is dull and glabrous, with some setae on the elytra.
