= Hyposerica castanea =

Scientific classification
- Kingdom: Animalia
- Phylum: Arthropoda
- Class: Insecta
- Order: Coleoptera
- Suborder: Polyphaga
- Infraorder: Scarabaeiformia
- Family: Scarabaeidae
- Genus: Hyposerica
- Species: H. castanea

Binomial name
- Hyposerica castanea (Blanchard, 1850)

Synonyms
- Emphania castanea Blanchard, 1850

Species of beetle

Hyposerica castanea is a species of beetle of the family Scarabaeidae. It is found in Madagascar.

== Description ==
Adults reach a length of about 8 mm. They have an oval, glossy brown body. The clypeus is broad, tapering towards the front, slightly margined, almost rounded anteriorly, conspicuous behind the anterior margin. There are individual setae and the surface is slightly convex, finely punctate, the suture indistinct, behind it a setate puncture on each side of the middle. The pronotum is very finely punctate, the sides straight, the hind angles almost angular, the margin at the posterior edge distinct. The elytra are evenly punctate, without striae, but with faint double rows of punctures, which are very little. The pygidium is very finely, indistinctly punctate.
