= Hyposerica disjuncta =

Scientific classification
- Kingdom: Animalia
- Phylum: Arthropoda
- Class: Insecta
- Order: Coleoptera
- Suborder: Polyphaga
- Infraorder: Scarabaeiformia
- Family: Scarabaeidae
- Genus: Hyposerica
- Species: H. disjuncta

Binomial name
- Hyposerica disjuncta Brenske, 1899

Species of beetle

Hyposerica disjuncta is a species of beetle of the family Scarabaeidae. It is found in Madagascar.

== Description ==
Adults reach a length of about 7 mm (0.28 in). They are brown underneath and dark metallic with a greenish sheen above. The clypeus is broad, slightly margined, with a weak elevation, densely, slightly wrinkled-punctate, with setae behind the anterior margin and before the suture. The frons is sparsely finely punctate. The pronotum is slightly projecting anteriorly, slightly margined laterally anteriorly, straight posteriorly, the corners sharply angled. The elytra are finely, almost dull-punctate, with smooth, narrow longitudinal lines and a slight transverse ridge before the apex. The pygidium is slightly punctate.
