= Hyposerica madagascariensis =

Scientific classification
- Kingdom: Animalia
- Phylum: Arthropoda
- Clade: Pancrustacea
- Class: Insecta
- Order: Coleoptera
- Suborder: Polyphaga
- Infraorder: Scarabaeiformia
- Family: Scarabaeidae
- Genus: Hyposerica
- Species: H. madagascariensis

Binomial name
- Hyposerica madagascariensis Moser, 1916

Species of beetle

Hyposerica madagascariensis is a species of beetle of the family Scarabaeidae. It is found in Madagascar.

== Description ==
Adults reach a length of about 12 mm. They are brown, thinly tomentose, and strongly opalescent. The head is strongly punctate and sparsely setate. The pronotum is finely and rather densely punctate, with setae along the lateral margins. The elytra are slightly wrinkled, moderately closely punctate, and sporadically have short setae. Flat ribs are indistinctly marked by enclosing rows of punctures and only very sparse punctation.
