= Dicranocnemus pulverulentus =

Scientific classification
- Kingdom: Animalia
- Phylum: Arthropoda
- Class: Insecta
- Order: Coleoptera
- Suborder: Polyphaga
- Infraorder: Scarabaeiformia
- Family: Scarabaeidae
- Genus: Dicranocnemus
- Species: D. pulverulentus

Binomial name
- Dicranocnemus pulverulentus Burmeister, 1844

Species of beetle

Dicranocnemus pulverulentus is a species of beetle of the family Scarabaeidae. It is found in South Africa (Eastern Cape).

== Description ==
Adults reach a length of about 4.25 mm (0.167 in). The elytra of the males are covered almost uniformly with round, golden scales which are not disposed in bands, but there is still a faint trace of a sutural whiter patch under the scutellum. Sometimes, the two costules on each side are somewhat distinct, and partly hairless at the basal part. The pronotum is clothed with a greyish not very short pubescence, and has along the base a somewhat broad band of yellow scales which fill also the longitudinal groove for one-third of the length. The scutellum is covered with scales which are a little lighter in hue than those covering the elytra. The scales on the pygidial part and abdomen are golden-yellow and the legs are piceous red. Females are clothed like the males, except that there is no basal band of scales on the pronotum.
