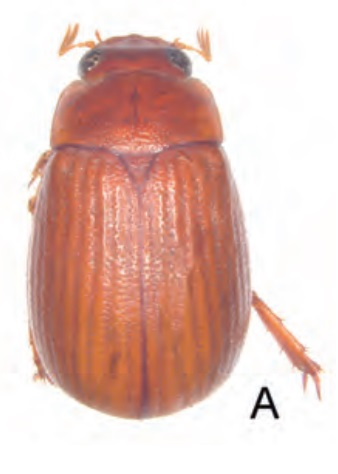

Scientific classification
- Kingdom: Animalia
- Phylum: Arthropoda
- Class: Insecta
- Order: Coleoptera
- Suborder: Polyphaga
- Infraorder: Scarabaeiformia
- Family: Scarabaeidae
- Genus: Selaserica
- Species: S. vagans

Binomial name
- Selaserica vagans Ahrens & Fabrizi, 2016

= Selaserica vagans =

Species of beetle

Selaserica vagans is a species of beetle of the family Scarabaeidae. It is found in India (Nilgiri Hills).

== Description ==
Adults reach a length of about 8 mm. They have a reddish brown, oval body. The antennae are yellow and the dorsal surface is glabrous and shiny.

== Etymology ==
The species name is derived from Latin vagans (meaning rambling) and refers to the distant occurrence of the species from the diversity centre of Selaserica in Sri Lanka.
