= Selaserica =

Scientific classification
- Kingdom: Animalia
- Phylum: Arthropoda
- Clade: Pancrustacea
- Class: Insecta
- Order: Coleoptera
- Suborder: Polyphaga
- Infraorder: Scarabaeiformia
- Family: Scarabaeidae
- Subfamily: Sericinae
- Tribe: Sericini
- Genus: Selaserica; Brenske, 1898

Genus of leaf beetles

Selaserica is a genus of beetles belonging to the family Scarabaeidae.

== Species ==
- Selaserica athukoralai Ranasinghe, Eberle, Benjamin & Ahrens, 2020
- Selaserica confirmata (Walker, 1859)
- Selaserica convexiuscula Fabrizi & Ahrens, 2014
- Selaserica distincticornis (Brenske, 1898)
- Selaserica fabriziae Ranasinghe et al., 2022
- Selaserica hosanagarana Sreedevi, Ranasinghe, Fabrizi & Ahrens, 2019
- Selaserica impexa Fabrizi & Ahrens, 2014
- Selaserica implicata (Brenske, 1898)
- Selaserica kanneliyana Fabrizi & Ahrens, 2014
- Selaserica karnatakaensis Ahrens & Fabrizi, 2016
- Selaserica knucklensis Fabrizi & Ahrens, 2014
- Selaserica lucidicollis Fabrizi & Ahrens, 2014
- Selaserica maculicauda (Arrow, 1916)
- Selaserica meridionalis Fabrizi & Ahrens, 2014
- Selaserica nitida (Candèze, 1861)
- Selaserica nuwarana Fabrizi & Ahrens, 2014
- Selaserica opacipennis Frey, 1973
- Selaserica padukkana Fabrizi & Ahrens, 2014
- Selaserica peechi Sreedevi & Ahrens, 2025
- Selaserica praetexta Fabrizi & Ahrens, 2014
- Selaserica pusilla Arrow, 1916
- Selaserica scutellaris Arrow, 1916
- Selaserica sericea Arrow, 1916
- Selaserica sinharajana Fabrizi & Ahrens, 2014
- Selaserica sororinitida Ranasinghe et al., 2022
- Selaserica splendifica (Brenske, 1898)
- Selaserica vagans Ahrens & Fabrizi, 2016
- Selaserica wilpattuensis Fabrizi & Ahrens, 2014
