= Maladera egregia =

Scientific classification
- Kingdom: Animalia
- Phylum: Arthropoda
- Class: Insecta
- Order: Coleoptera
- Suborder: Polyphaga
- Infraorder: Scarabaeiformia
- Family: Scarabaeidae
- Genus: Maladera
- Species: M. egregia

Binomial name
- Maladera egregia (Arrow, 1946)

Synonyms
- Aserica egregia Arrow, 1946

Species of beetle

Maladera egregia is a species of beetle of the family Scarabaeidae. It is found in Myanmar.

== Description ==
Adults reach a length of about 8.6 mm. They have a reddish brown, oblong-oval body. The antennae are yellow, iridescent and shiny, while the frons and pronotum are somewhat dull. The dorsal face is nearly glabrous.
