= Hyposerica =

Scientific classification
- Kingdom: Animalia
- Phylum: Arthropoda
- Clade: Pancrustacea
- Class: Insecta
- Order: Coleoptera
- Suborder: Polyphaga
- Infraorder: Scarabaeiformia
- Family: Scarabaeidae
- Subfamily: Sericinae
- Tribe: Sericini
- Genus: Hyposerica; Brenske, 1898

Genus of leaf beetles

Hyposerica is a genus of beetles belonging to the family Scarabaeidae.

== Species ==
Name	Taxon author(s)
Hyposerica abdominalis	Arrow, 1948
Hyposerica blanchardi	Brenske, 1899
Hyposerica borbonnica	Arrow, 1948
Hyposerica brunneipennis	Moser, 1918
Hyposerica brunneipes	Moser, 1915
Hyposerica carinata	(Burmeister, 1855)
Hyposerica castanea	(Blanchard, 1850)
Hyposerica castanipes	Brenske, 1899
Hyposerica cinnamomea	(Klug, 1834)
Hyposerica costata	Moser, 1911
Hyposerica courtoisi	Ahrens, Fabrizi, 2009
Hyposerica cruciata	(Burmeister, 1855)
Hyposerica dauphinensis	Brenske, 1899
Hyposerica definitiva	Brenske, 1899
Hyposerica defloccata	Brenske, 1899
Hyposerica delecta	Brenske, 1899
Hyposerica delibuta	Brenske, 1899
Hyposerica delumba	Brenske, 1899
Hyposerica diegana	Moser, 1911
Hyposerica disjuncta	Brenske, 1899
Hyposerica dorsalis	Frey, 1968
Hyposerica fenerivensis	Moser, 1915
Hyposerica flaveola	Frey, 1968
Hyposerica flavicornis	Arrow, 1948
Hyposerica fuliginosa	Lacroix, 1994
Hyposerica geminata	(Klug, 1834)
Hyposerica goudoti	Brenske, 1899
Hyposerica grandidieri	Brenske, 1899
Hyposerica grossa	(Blanchard, 1850)
Hyposerica humbloti	Brenske, 1899
Hyposerica imitans	Frey, 1975
Hyposerica inflata	(Fairmaire, 1898)
Hyposerica iridescens	(Nonfried, 1891)
Hyposerica klugi	Brenske, 1899
Hyposerica luridipennis	Moser, 1915
Hyposerica maculata	Frey, 1964
Hyposerica madagascariensis	Moser, 1916
Hyposerica martialis	Arrow, 1948
Hyposerica mauritii	Arrow, 1948
Hyposerica micans	(Klug, 1834)
Hyposerica midongyensis	Moser, 1926
Hyposerica mystica	Brenske, 1899
Hyposerica nucea	(Fairmaire, 1886)
Hyposerica opaca	Frey, 1975
Hyposerica orbiculata	Lacroix, 1994
Hyposerica pernitida	(Fairmaire, 1897)
Hyposerica pexicollis	(Fairmaire, 1897)
Hyposerica piceonigra	Moser, 1915
Hyposerica pierroni	Brenske, 1899
Hyposerica porphyrea	Lacroix, 1994
Hyposerica pruinosella	Brenske, 1899
Hyposerica rosettae	Frey, 1975
Hyposerica rufina	Burmeister, 1855
Hyposerica sericeomicans	Moser, 1915
Hyposerica silvicola	Moser, 1915
Hyposerica strenua	Brenske, 1899
Hyposerica submetallica	Arrow, 1948
Hyposerica subrugipennis	Moser, 1911
Hyposerica suturalis	Arrow, 1948
Hyposerica tibialis	Arrow, 1948
Hyposerica truncatipennis	Moser, 1915
Hyposerica vinsoni	Arrow, 1948

== Selected former species ==
- Hyposerica laevigata
