= Dicranocnemus spiniceps =

Scientific classification
- Kingdom: Animalia
- Phylum: Arthropoda
- Class: Insecta
- Order: Coleoptera
- Suborder: Polyphaga
- Infraorder: Scarabaeiformia
- Family: Scarabaeidae
- Genus: Dicranocnemus
- Species: D. spiniceps

Binomial name
- Dicranocnemus spiniceps Péringuey, 1908

Species of beetle

Dicranocnemus spiniceps is a species of beetle of the family Scarabaeidae. It is found in South Africa (Western Cape, Eastern Cape).

== Description ==
Adults reach a length of about 4.25 mm (0.167 in). They are black, with the elytra slightly rufescent laterally, and with the claws and hind tibiae reddish. The pronotum is moderately deeply grooved longitudinally in the hind part, covered with punctures turning to granules on the sides and clothed with a fairly long sub-flavescent pubescence and a few yellow scales along the base. The scutellum is scaly and the elytra are sub-bicostulate on each side, very deeply punctate, not pubescent, but sprinkled with small ovate yellowish or yellowish white scales which are more numerous across the median part where they form two patches, and along the apical margin where they form a broad border. The propygidium is clothed with thick elongate yellow scales and the underside and legs are densely hairy, with greyish hairs.
