= Hyposerica dauphinensis =

Scientific classification
- Kingdom: Animalia
- Phylum: Arthropoda
- Class: Insecta
- Order: Coleoptera
- Suborder: Polyphaga
- Infraorder: Scarabaeiformia
- Family: Scarabaeidae
- Genus: Hyposerica
- Species: H. dauphinensis

Binomial name
- Hyposerica dauphinensis Brenske, 1899

Species of beetle

Hyposerica dauphinensis is a species of beetle of the family Scarabaeidae. It is found in Madagascar.

== Description ==
Adults reach a length of about 7 mm. They are yellowish-brown with a pitch-brown head and pronotum. The clypeus is densely wrinkled and punctate, distinctly margined anteriorly, the anterior angles less rounded. The frons is very densely and finely punctate, with a few weak setae behind the suture. When compared to similar Hyposerica delibuta, the pronotum of H. dauphinensis is less transverse, less strongly projecting anteriorly in the middle, the lateral margin less indented posteriorly, not as thickened, the posterior angles obtuse, the posterior margin distinctly margined as in H. delibuta, the surface densely and finely punctate. The elytra are yellowish, densely and finely punctate, with barely indicated ribs, which are formed by two rows of punctures and individual weak setae. Only the line next to the suture is more distinct and covered with more numerous setae. The lateral marginal stripe, in which setae are located, is slightly widened in the middle. The pygidium is smooth and very finely punctate.
