= Hyposerica flaveola =

Scientific classification
- Kingdom: Animalia
- Phylum: Arthropoda
- Class: Insecta
- Order: Coleoptera
- Suborder: Polyphaga
- Infraorder: Scarabaeiformia
- Family: Scarabaeidae
- Genus: Hyposerica
- Species: H. flaveola

Binomial name
- Hyposerica flaveola Frey, 1968

Species of beetle

Hyposerica flaveola is a species of beetle of the family Scarabaeidae. It is found in Madagascar.

== Description ==
Adults reach a length of about 6 mm. The upper and lower surfaces are reddish-yellow. The head is shiny, the pronotum dull, the elytra opalescent and the underside shiny. The pronotum has pale cilia and the elytra has a few short, erect setae, as well as pale setae.
