= Hyposerica diegana =

Scientific classification
- Kingdom: Animalia
- Phylum: Arthropoda
- Clade: Pancrustacea
- Class: Insecta
- Order: Coleoptera
- Suborder: Polyphaga
- Infraorder: Scarabaeiformia
- Family: Scarabaeidae
- Genus: Hyposerica
- Species: H. diegana

Binomial name
- Hyposerica diegana Moser, 1911

Species of beetle

Hyposerica diegana is a species of beetle of the family Scarabaeidae. It is found in Madagascar.

== Description ==
Adults reach a length of about 5.5–6.5 mm. They are either entirely brown or the elytra are black with indistinct brown spots. The upper surface is dull, but more or less opalescent. The frons is unpunctate, brown or black. The pronotum has very fine punctation, the lateral margins with a few ciliate hairs. The elytra have two rows of strong punctures in the striae. The interstices are narrow, smooth, and convex. The lateral margins have bristle-like cilia, and individual protruding setae are also present on the disc.
