= Selaserica sinharajana =

Scientific classification
- Kingdom: Animalia
- Phylum: Arthropoda
- Class: Insecta
- Order: Coleoptera
- Suborder: Polyphaga
- Infraorder: Scarabaeiformia
- Family: Scarabaeidae
- Genus: Selaserica
- Species: S. sinharajana

Binomial name
- Selaserica sinharajana Fabrizi & Ahrens, 2014

Species of beetle

Selaserica sinharajana is a species of beetle of the family Scarabaeidae. It is found in Sri Lanka.

== Description ==
Adults reach a length of about 7.5–7.8 mm. They have a reddish brown, oval body, with yellow antennae. The dorsal surface is shiny and glabrous, with some setae on the elytra.

== Etymology ==
The species name refers to the type locality, the Sinharaja Jungle.
