= Selaserica knucklensis =

Scientific classification
- Kingdom: Animalia
- Phylum: Arthropoda
- Class: Insecta
- Order: Coleoptera
- Suborder: Polyphaga
- Infraorder: Scarabaeiformia
- Family: Scarabaeidae
- Genus: Selaserica
- Species: S. knucklensis

Binomial name
- Selaserica knucklensis Fabrizi & Ahrens, 2014

Species of beetle

Selaserica knucklensis is a species of beetle of the family Scarabaeidae. It is found in Sri Lanka.

== Description ==
Adults reach a length of about 9.4 mm. They have a reddish brown, oblong body, with yellowish brown antennae. The dorsal surface is shiny and nearly glabrous, except for some long, fine setae on the elytra.

== Etymology ==
The species is named for its type locality, the Knuckles Mountain Range.
