= Dicranocnemus arduus =

Scientific classification
- Kingdom: Animalia
- Phylum: Arthropoda
- Class: Insecta
- Order: Coleoptera
- Suborder: Polyphaga
- Infraorder: Scarabaeiformia
- Family: Scarabaeidae
- Genus: Dicranocnemus
- Species: D. arduus

Binomial name
- Dicranocnemus arduus Péringuey, 1908

Species of beetle

Dicranocnemus arduus is a species of beetle of the family Scarabaeidae. It is found in South Africa (Eastern Cape).

== Description ==
Adults reach a length of about 4 mm (0.16 in). The head and pronotum are black, while the elytra, underside and legs are rufescent. The head and clypeus are deeply and closely punctate, the punctures scabrose on the sides only, clothed with a very short, greyish not scaly pubescence, and moderately deeply grooved longitudinally. The scutellum is pubescent. The elytra are short, narrowed behind, sub-costulate, and clothed with elongated flavescent scales not set closely and not hiding the red background. The propygidiurn and sides of the abdomen are covered with flavescent scales, while the pygidium is closely covered with thick scales which are somewhat fulvous on each side of the basal part, and looking, on that account, not unlike two faint fulvescent patches.
