= Australoxenella peckorum =

Scientific classification
- Kingdom: Animalia
- Phylum: Arthropoda
- Clade: Pancrustacea
- Class: Insecta
- Order: Coleoptera
- Suborder: Polyphaga
- Infraorder: Scarabaeiformia
- Family: Scarabaeidae
- Genus: Australoxenella
- Species: A. peckorum

Binomial name
- Australoxenella peckorum Storey & Howden, 1996

Species of beetle

Australoxenella peckorum is a species of beetle of the family Scarabaeidae. It is found in Australia (Northern Territory).

== Description ==
Adults reach a length of about 2.3–3 mm (0.091–0.118 in). They are reddish brown dorsally and ventrally.

== Life history ==
The habitat consists of eucalyptus woodlands and rainforests.

== Etymology ==
The species is named in honour of Stewart and Jarmila Peck who first collected the species.
