= Neoserica vulpes =

Scientific classification
- Kingdom: Animalia
- Phylum: Arthropoda
- Class: Insecta
- Order: Coleoptera
- Suborder: Polyphaga
- Infraorder: Scarabaeiformia
- Family: Scarabaeidae
- Genus: Neoserica
- Species: N. vulpes

Binomial name
- Neoserica vulpes (Arrow, 1946)

Synonyms
- Serica vulpes Arrow, 1946

Species of beetle

Neoserica vulpes is a species of beetle of the family Scarabaeidae. It is found in Myanmar.

== Description ==
Adults reach a length of about 8.8 mm. They have a light reddish brown, oblong body. The antennae are yellow and the dorsal surface is dull and nearly glabrous, except for a few long erect setae on the elytra.
