= Australoxenella moogoon =

Scientific classification
- Kingdom: Animalia
- Phylum: Arthropoda
- Clade: Pancrustacea
- Class: Insecta
- Order: Coleoptera
- Suborder: Polyphaga
- Infraorder: Scarabaeiformia
- Family: Scarabaeidae
- Genus: Australoxenella
- Species: A. moogoon

Binomial name
- Australoxenella moogoon Storey & Howden, 1996

Species of beetle

Australoxenella moogoon is a species of beetle of the family Scarabaeidae. It is found in Australia (Northern Territory).

== Description ==
Adults reach a length of about 2.4–2.5 mm (0.094–0.098 in). They are reddish brown dorsally and slightly lighter ventrally.

== Etymology ==
The name of the species is the Aboriginal word for beetle.
