= Selaserica wilpattuensis =

Scientific classification
- Kingdom: Animalia
- Phylum: Arthropoda
- Class: Insecta
- Order: Coleoptera
- Suborder: Polyphaga
- Infraorder: Scarabaeiformia
- Family: Scarabaeidae
- Genus: Selaserica
- Species: S. wilpattuensis

Binomial name
- Selaserica wilpattuensis Fabrizi & Ahrens, 2014

Species of beetle

Selaserica wilpattuensis is a species of beetle of the family Scarabaeidae. It is found in Sri Lanka.

== Description ==
Adults reach a length of about 5.1–5.6 mm. They have a light reddish brown, oval body, with yellow antennae. The dorsal surface is dull but with a shiny head and some setae on the elytra.

== Etymology ==
The species name refers to its occurrence in the Wilpattu National Park.
