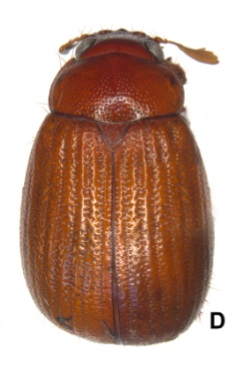

Scientific classification
- Kingdom: Animalia
- Phylum: Arthropoda
- Class: Insecta
- Order: Coleoptera
- Suborder: Polyphaga
- Infraorder: Scarabaeiformia
- Family: Scarabaeidae
- Genus: Selaserica
- Species: S. athukoralai

Binomial name
- Selaserica athukoralai Ranasinghe, Eberle, Benjamin & Ahrens, 2020

= Selaserica athukoralai =

Species of beetle

Selaserica athukoralai is a species of beetle of the family Scarabaeidae. It is found in Sri Lanka.

== Description ==
Adults reach a length of about 7 mm. They have a reddish brown, oval body. The antennae are yellow, and the dorsal surface is shiny and glabrous.

== Etymology ==
The species is named after Mr. N.P. Athukorala.
