= Hyposerica fenerivensis =

Scientific classification
- Kingdom: Animalia
- Phylum: Arthropoda
- Clade: Pancrustacea
- Class: Insecta
- Order: Coleoptera
- Suborder: Polyphaga
- Infraorder: Scarabaeiformia
- Family: Scarabaeidae
- Genus: Hyposerica
- Species: H. fenerivensis

Binomial name
- Hyposerica fenerivensis Moser, 1915

Species of beetle

Hyposerica fenerivensis is a species of beetle of the family Scarabaeidae. It is found in Madagascar.

== Description ==
Adults reach a length of about 8 mm. They are blackish-brown and dull, with a faint greenish-ore sheen on the upper surface. The shiny legs are brown. The frons is shiny and coppery-green and rather sparsely and irregularly punctate, with occasional setae. The antennae are yellowish-brown. The punctation of the pronotum is moderately dense and the lateral margins are setate. The elytra have irregular rows of punctures and each elytron has five unpunctured longitudinal striations bordered by regular rows of punctures. Individual punctures have distinct pale setae.
