= Dicranocnemus =

Scientific classification
- Kingdom: Animalia
- Phylum: Arthropoda
- Class: Insecta
- Order: Coleoptera
- Suborder: Polyphaga
- Infraorder: Scarabaeiformia
- Family: Scarabaeidae
- Subfamily: Melolonthinae
- Tribe: Hopliini
- Genus: Dicranocnemus; Burmeister, 1844

Genus beetles

Dicranocnemus is a genus of beetles belonging to the family Scarabaeidae.

== Species ==
- Subgenus Dicranocnemus
  - Dicranocnemus arduus Péringuey, 1908
  - Dicranocnemus burchelli Arrow, 1917
  - Dicranocnemus hypocrita Péringuey, 1902
  - Dicranocnemus mendicus Péringuey, 1902
  - Dicranocnemus natalensis Péringuey, 1902
  - Dicranocnemus nudus Schein, 1958
  - Dicranocnemus pulcher Péringuey, 1902
  - Dicranocnemus pulverulentus Burmeister, 1844
  - Dicranocnemus spiniceps Péringuey, 1908
  - Dicranocnemus squamosus Burmeister, 1844
  - Dicranocnemus squamulatus Burmeister, 1844
  - Dicranocnemus sulcicollis (Wiedemann, 1821)
- Subgenus Macrodicranocnemus Schein, 1958
  - Dicranocnemus andreai Schein, 1958
  - Dicranocnemus hirtipes Schein, 1958
