= Hyposerica geminata =

Scientific classification
- Kingdom: Animalia
- Phylum: Arthropoda
- Class: Insecta
- Order: Coleoptera
- Suborder: Polyphaga
- Infraorder: Scarabaeiformia
- Family: Scarabaeidae
- Genus: Hyposerica
- Species: H. geminata

Binomial name
- Hyposerica geminata (Klug, 1834)

Synonyms
- Serica geminata Klug, 1834

Species of beetle

Hyposerica geminata is a species of beetle of the family Scarabaeidae. It is found in Madagascar.

== Description ==
Adults reach a length of about 7 mm. They are shiny reddish-brown, with a somewhat silky-sheen underneath and somewhat darker chestnut-brown above. The clypeus is distinctly margined anteriorly, impressed behind, somewhat widely punctate, smooth with coarser setae. The frons is more finely punctate. The pronotum is short, distinctly projecting anteriorly, the sides only slightly widened, the hind angles very broadly rounded, finely punctate. The elytra have two strong rows of punctures in the striae and the intervals are smooth, strongly raised and fading before the apex. The scutellum is pointed and small.
