= Hyposerica opaca =

Scientific classification
- Kingdom: Animalia
- Phylum: Arthropoda
- Clade: Pancrustacea
- Class: Insecta
- Order: Coleoptera
- Suborder: Polyphaga
- Infraorder: Scarabaeiformia
- Family: Scarabaeidae
- Genus: Hyposerica
- Species: H. opaca

Binomial name
- Hyposerica opaca Frey, 1975

Species of beetle

Hyposerica opaca is a species of beetle of the family Scarabaeidae. It is found in Madagascar.

== Description ==
Adults reach a length of about 12 mm. They have an egg-shaped body. The upper and lower surfaces are dark reddish-brown (with the underside somewhat lighter). The entire upper surface (with the exception of the shiny clypeus) is dull and strongly tomentose without any opalescent sheen. There are a few scattered erect hairs on the upper surface and the pronotum and elytral margin are sparsely fringed with light brown hairs. The antennae are yellowish-brown.
