= Selaserica confirmata =

Scientific classification
- Kingdom: Animalia
- Phylum: Arthropoda
- Class: Insecta
- Order: Coleoptera
- Suborder: Polyphaga
- Infraorder: Scarabaeiformia
- Family: Scarabaeidae
- Genus: Selaserica
- Species: S. confirmata

Binomial name
- Selaserica confirmata (Walker, 1859)

Synonyms
- Sericesthis confirmata Walker, 1859; Serica confirmata

Species of beetle

Selaserica confirmata is a species of beetle of the family Scarabaeidae. It is found in Sri Lanka.

== Description ==
Adults reach a length of about 6.6 mm. They have a reddish brown, oval body, with yellowish brown antennae. The dorsal surface is dull and glabrous, except for some long, with some setae on the elytra.
