= Hyposerica delumba =

Scientific classification
- Kingdom: Animalia
- Phylum: Arthropoda
- Class: Insecta
- Order: Coleoptera
- Suborder: Polyphaga
- Infraorder: Scarabaeiformia
- Family: Scarabaeidae
- Genus: Hyposerica
- Species: H. delumba

Binomial name
- Hyposerica delumba Brenske, 1899

Species of beetle

Hyposerica delumba is a species of beetle of the family Scarabaeidae. It is found in Madagascar.

== Description ==
Adults reach a length of about 8 mm. They have a reddish-brown, tomentose, opalescent, elongate-oval body. The clypeus is broad, dull, slightly unevenly punctate, with very faint elevation. The frons is finely punctate and the pronotum is broad, projecting anteriorly, rounded posteriorly with very broadly rounded hind angles, finely punctate. The elytra are densely and coarsely punctate in the striae, with the intervals narrow, smooth, raised, and therefore more distinct than in related species.
