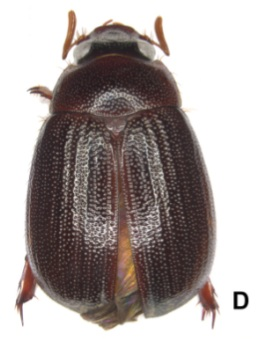

Scientific classification
- Kingdom: Animalia
- Phylum: Arthropoda
- Class: Insecta
- Order: Coleoptera
- Suborder: Polyphaga
- Infraorder: Scarabaeiformia
- Family: Scarabaeidae
- Genus: Selaserica
- Species: S. fabriziae

Binomial name
- Selaserica fabriziae Ranasinghe et al., 2022

= Selaserica fabriziae =

Species of beetle

Selaserica fabriziae is a species of beetle of the family Scarabaeidae. It is found in Sri Lanka.

== Description ==
Adults reach a length of about 8.2–8.8 mm (males) and 8.8–9.2 mm (females). They have an oval, dark brown body. The antennae are yellow, and the dorsal surface is shiny and glabrous.

== Etymology ==
The species is dedicated to Silvia Fabrizi in memory of her and for all her efforts for Sericini taxonomy.
