= Tanyproctoides mirzayansinus =

Scientific classification
- Kingdom: Animalia
- Phylum: Arthropoda
- Clade: Pancrustacea
- Class: Insecta
- Order: Coleoptera
- Suborder: Polyphaga
- Infraorder: Scarabaeiformia
- Family: Scarabaeidae
- Genus: Tanyproctoides
- Species: T. mirzayansinus

Binomial name
- Tanyproctoides mirzayansinus Keith & Montreuil, 2004

Species of beetle

Tanyproctoides mirzayansinus is a species of beetle of the family Scarabaeidae. It is found in Iran.

== Description ==
Adults reach a length of about 13.5 mm. The upper and lower surfaces are brown, with lighter elytra. The antennae are testaceous.

== Etymology ==
The species is named after M. H. Mirzayans, the former director of the Insect Taxonomy Research Department and Plant Pests and Diseases Research Institute in Teheran, who first collected the species.
