= Hyposerica courtoisi =

Scientific classification
- Kingdom: Animalia
- Phylum: Arthropoda
- Class: Insecta
- Order: Coleoptera
- Suborder: Polyphaga
- Infraorder: Scarabaeiformia
- Family: Scarabaeidae
- Genus: Hyposerica
- Species: H. courtoisi

Binomial name
- Hyposerica courtoisi Ahrens & Fabrizi, 2009

Species of beetle

Hyposerica courtoisi is a species of beetle of the family Scarabaeidae. It is found on Mauritius.

== Description ==
Adults reach a length of about 15.2–16.3 mm. They have a dark reddish brown, shiny, oval body. The dorsum is glabrous, except for a few small setae on the head and elytra.

== Etymology ==
The species is dedicated to its collector, C. M. Courtois.
