= Hyposerica midongyensis =

Scientific classification
- Kingdom: Animalia
- Phylum: Arthropoda
- Clade: Pancrustacea
- Class: Insecta
- Order: Coleoptera
- Suborder: Polyphaga
- Infraorder: Scarabaeiformia
- Family: Scarabaeidae
- Genus: Hyposerica
- Species: H. midongyensis

Binomial name
- Hyposerica midongyensis Moser, 1926

Species of beetle

Hyposerica midongyensis is a species of beetle of the family Scarabaeidae. It is found in Madagascar.

== Description ==
Adults reach a length of about 8 mm. They are dark brown or blackish-brown and opaque. The frons is sparsely punctate and the antennae are reddish-yellow with a yellow club.
