= Selaserica opacipennis =

Scientific classification
- Kingdom: Animalia
- Phylum: Arthropoda
- Class: Insecta
- Order: Coleoptera
- Suborder: Polyphaga
- Infraorder: Scarabaeiformia
- Family: Scarabaeidae
- Genus: Selaserica
- Species: S. opacipennis

Binomial name
- Selaserica opacipennis Frey, 1973

Species of beetle

Selaserica opacipennis is a species of beetle of the family Scarabaeidae. It is found in India (Kerala, Tamil Nadu).

== Description ==
Adults reach a length of about 7.4 mm. They have a reddish brown, oval body. The antennae are yellow and the dorsal surface is glabrous and dull with an iridescent shine.
