= Selaserica peechi =

Scientific classification
- Kingdom: Animalia
- Phylum: Arthropoda
- Class: Insecta
- Order: Coleoptera
- Suborder: Polyphaga
- Infraorder: Scarabaeiformia
- Family: Scarabaeidae
- Genus: Selaserica
- Species: S. peechi

Binomial name
- Selaserica peechi Sreedevi & Ahrens, 2025

Species of beetle

Selaserica peechi is a species of beetle of the family Scarabaeidae. It is found in India (Kerala).

== Description ==
Adults reach a length of about 9.8 mm. They have a reddish brown, oval body. The antennae are yellow. The dorsal surface is glabrous and dull with an iridescent shine.

== Etymology ==
The species is named after the type locality, Peechi.
