= Selaserica padukkana =

Scientific classification
- Kingdom: Animalia
- Phylum: Arthropoda
- Class: Insecta
- Order: Coleoptera
- Suborder: Polyphaga
- Infraorder: Scarabaeiformia
- Family: Scarabaeidae
- Genus: Selaserica
- Species: S. padukkana

Binomial name
- Selaserica padukkana Fabrizi & Ahrens, 2014

Species of beetle

Selaserica padukkana is a species of beetle of the family Scarabaeidae. It is found in Sri Lanka.

== Description ==
Adults reach a length of about 9.6–11 mm. They have a dark reddish brown, oblong body, with yellowish brown antennae.

== Etymology ==
The species is named after its type locality, Padukka.
