= Hyposerica luridipennis =

Scientific classification
- Kingdom: Animalia
- Phylum: Arthropoda
- Clade: Pancrustacea
- Class: Insecta
- Order: Coleoptera
- Suborder: Polyphaga
- Infraorder: Scarabaeiformia
- Family: Scarabaeidae
- Genus: Hyposerica
- Species: H. luridipennis

Binomial name
- Hyposerica luridipennis Moser, 1915

Species of beetle

Hyposerica luridipennis is a species of beetle of the family Scarabaeidae. It is found in Madagascar.

== Description ==
Adults reach a length of about 7 mm. They are shiny and yellow, while the head, pronotum and scutellum are reddish-yellow. The frons is sparsely punctate behind the suture and the antennae are reddish-yellow. The pronotum is fairly widely spaced and finely punctate, with a few setae laterally along the anterior margin. The elytra have irregular rows of punctures, with barely noticeable smooth longitudinal striations. The posterior margin has a narrow membranous fringe.
