= Selaserica kanneliyana =

Scientific classification
- Kingdom: Animalia
- Phylum: Arthropoda
- Class: Insecta
- Order: Coleoptera
- Suborder: Polyphaga
- Infraorder: Scarabaeiformia
- Family: Scarabaeidae
- Genus: Selaserica
- Species: S. kanneliyana

Binomial name
- Selaserica kanneliyana Fabrizi & Ahrens, 2014

Species of beetle

Selaserica kanneliyana is a species of beetle of the family Scarabaeidae. It is found in Sri Lanka.

== Description ==
Adults reach a length of about 5.7-6.3 mm. They have an oblong body. The dorsal surface is dark brown, while the ventral surface is reddish brown and the antennae are yellowish brown. The dorsal surface is dull, the head shiny and there some setae on the elytra.

== Etymology ==
The species is named after its type locality, Kanneliya.
