= Hyposerica brunneipes =

Scientific classification
- Kingdom: Animalia
- Phylum: Arthropoda
- Clade: Pancrustacea
- Class: Insecta
- Order: Coleoptera
- Suborder: Polyphaga
- Infraorder: Scarabaeiformia
- Family: Scarabaeidae
- Genus: Hyposerica
- Species: H. brunneipes

Binomial name
- Hyposerica brunneipes Moser, 1915

Species of beetle

Hyposerica brunneipes is a species of beetle of the family Scarabaeidae. It is found in Madagascar.

== Description ==
Adults reach a length of about 6 mm. The upper surface is black and somewhat opalescent, while the underside is brown. The legs are shiny. The head is rather sparsely punctate and the antennae are brown. The pronotum has moderately dense punctation and the elytra have rows of punctures, with narrow, indistinctly marked, unpunctate ribs.
