= Tanyproctoides freyi =

Scientific classification
- Kingdom: Animalia
- Phylum: Arthropoda
- Class: Insecta
- Order: Coleoptera
- Suborder: Polyphaga
- Infraorder: Scarabaeiformia
- Family: Scarabaeidae
- Genus: Tanyproctoides
- Species: T. freyi

Binomial name
- Tanyproctoides freyi (Petrovitz, 1968)

Synonyms
- Tanyproctus freyi Petrovitz, 1968

Species of beetle

Tanyproctoides freyi is a species of beetle of the family Scarabaeidae. It is found in Iraq.

== Description ==
Adults reach a length of about 10 mm. They have a narrowly egg-shaped, pale brownish-yellow body, with the edges of the clypeus darker. The upper surface, especially the elytra, are not glossy.
