= Hyposerica porphyrea =

Scientific classification
- Kingdom: Animalia
- Phylum: Arthropoda
- Class: Insecta
- Order: Coleoptera
- Suborder: Polyphaga
- Infraorder: Scarabaeiformia
- Family: Scarabaeidae
- Genus: Hyposerica
- Species: H. porphyrea

Binomial name
- Hyposerica porphyrea Lacroix, 1994

Species of beetle

Hyposerica porphyrea is a species of beetle of the family Scarabaeidae. It is found on the Comoros.

== Description ==
Adults reach a length of about 10 mm. They have a short, rather oval body. The upper surface is reddish-brown. Thye clypeus has oblique sides, a very slightly rounded anterior margin and a densely punctate surface. The pronotum has fine, inconspicuous punctation. There are erect cilia on the head and sides of the pronotum. The elytra have a broadly bordered suture and the punctation is shallow and sparse.
