= Hyposerica pruinosella =

Scientific classification
- Kingdom: Animalia
- Phylum: Arthropoda
- Class: Insecta
- Order: Coleoptera
- Suborder: Polyphaga
- Infraorder: Scarabaeiformia
- Family: Scarabaeidae
- Genus: Hyposerica
- Species: H. pruinosella

Binomial name
- Hyposerica pruinosella Brenske, 1899

Species of beetle

Hyposerica pruinosella is a species of beetle of the family Scarabaeidae. It is found in Madagascar.

== Description ==
Adults reach a length of about 7.5 mm. They are brown and dull underneath, with the legs shiny. They are very strongly pruinose and shiny above, with a darker pronotum and reddish-brown, punctate elytra, which, in addition to the marginal setae, bear a row of distinct setate punctures. The clypeus is large, more blunt than rounded anteriorly, distinctly margined, densely punctate, slightly tuberculate with several large and distinct setate punctures. Two fine setae punctures are present on the finely punctate frons. The pronotum is convex, distinctly margined, with a smooth border anteriorly, somewhat projecting in the middle, the sides slightly, the posterior angles broadly rounded with scattered fine setae, the posterior margin with a finely demarcated line. The scutellum is finely pubescent laterally. The elytra are coarsely punctate and wrinkled. These wrinkles form indeterminate longitudinal lines (main and secondary striae), which are, however, clearly visible against the glossy surface. The lateral margin is densely setate. The pygidium is finely punctate and dull, although sometimes somewhat glossy.
