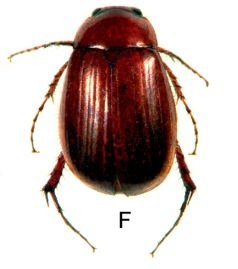

Scientific classification
- Kingdom: Animalia
- Phylum: Arthropoda
- Class: Insecta
- Order: Coleoptera
- Suborder: Polyphaga
- Infraorder: Scarabaeiformia
- Family: Scarabaeidae
- Genus: Selaserica
- Species: S. nitida

Binomial name
- Selaserica nitida (Candéze, 1861)

Synonyms
- Serica nitida Candéze, 1861

= Selaserica nitida =

Species of beetle

Selaserica nitida is a species of beetle of the family Scarabaeidae. It is found in Sri Lanka.

== Description ==
Adults reach a length of about 11.5–13.8 mm. They have a reddish brown, oblong body, with yellowish brown antennae. The dorsal surface is shiny, and nearly glabrous, except for some long, fine setae on the elytra.
