= Hyposerica definitiva =

Scientific classification
- Kingdom: Animalia
- Phylum: Arthropoda
- Class: Insecta
- Order: Coleoptera
- Suborder: Polyphaga
- Infraorder: Scarabaeiformia
- Family: Scarabaeidae
- Genus: Hyposerica
- Species: H. definitiva

Binomial name
- Hyposerica definitiva Brenske, 1899

Species of beetle

Hyposerica definitiva is a species of beetle of the family Scarabaeidae. It is found in Madagascar.

== Description ==
Adults reach a length of about 8 mm. They are dark brownish-red, strongly tomentose and vividly opalescent. The clypeus is broad, densely wrinkled and punctate, without elevation, with two setae before the suture, which is strongly curved backward. The frons is very broad and finely punctate, with two finer setae at the suture. The pronotum is only slightly rounded at the sides, the posterior angles very broadly rounded, the anterior angles project forward at an angle, so that the anterior margin appears almost angularly emarginate. The scutellum is finely punctate, slightly raised in the unpunctate center. The elytra are without a raised suture, with very faint striae, finely punctate, slightly wrinkled, with very faint setae at the margin, and very few white setae on the surface.
