= Hyposerica nucea =

Scientific classification
- Kingdom: Animalia
- Phylum: Arthropoda
- Class: Insecta
- Order: Coleoptera
- Suborder: Polyphaga
- Infraorder: Scarabaeiformia
- Family: Scarabaeidae
- Genus: Hyposerica
- Species: H. nucea

Binomial name
- Hyposerica nucea (Fairmaire, 1886)

Synonyms
- Serica nucea Fairmaire, 1886

Species of beetle

Hyposerica nucea is a species of beetle of the family Scarabaeidae. It is found in Madagascar.

== Description ==
Adults reach a length of about 8 mm. They are shiny brown, the posterior margin of the pronotum with a fringe. The clypeus is broad at the base, rounded almost oval towards the front, densely and rather finely punctate, without wrinkles, with a seta on each side before the fine suture, and a row of less distinct setae behind the anterior margin, the center scarcely raised. The frons is finely punctate immediately behind the suture, smooth towards the rear and on the vertex. The pronotum is somewhat shortened, distinctly projecting forward in the middle anteriorly, the sides almost straight, the marginal setae distinct, the posterior angles broadly rounded, the posterior margin with a distinct edge which strongly marks the indentations in front of the scutellum, the surface is shiny, finely but not very densely punctate. The scutellum is flat, long and pointed. The elytra have a flat suture and narrow, smooth ribs that protrude only slightly and irregularly from the dense punctation. The pygidium is weakly and finely punctate and slightly rounded at the apex.
