= Hyposerica cruciata =

Scientific classification
- Kingdom: Animalia
- Phylum: Arthropoda
- Class: Insecta
- Order: Coleoptera
- Suborder: Polyphaga
- Infraorder: Scarabaeiformia
- Family: Scarabaeidae
- Genus: Hyposerica
- Species: H. cruciata

Binomial name
- Hyposerica cruciata (Burmeister, 1855)

Synonyms
- Serica cruciata Burmeister, 1855; Hyposerica cruciata grouvellei Brenske, 1899

Species of beetle

Hyposerica cruciata is a species of beetle of the family Scarabaeidae. It is found in Madagascar.

== Description ==
Adults reach a length of about 5 mm. The head, pronotum and underside are dark, while the elytra are clay-yellow with a dark margin and dark suture, as well as a fine connecting line between the two in the middle, which is sometimes absent, and very rarely entirely dark. The clypeus is narrowly covered with densely punctate hairs. The pronotum is strongly convex, densely and finely punctate, in the anterior half with long, erect hairs in coarser punctations. The elytra are distinctly ribbed, but the secondary ribs are absent or only weakly developed, with bristle-like punctures along the suture and ribs. The rounded pygidium is smooth and shiny at the apex.
