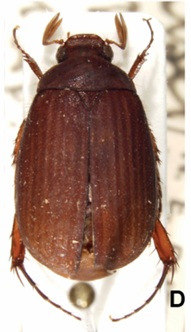

Scientific classification
- Kingdom: Animalia
- Phylum: Arthropoda
- Clade: Pancrustacea
- Class: Insecta
- Order: Coleoptera
- Suborder: Polyphaga
- Infraorder: Scarabaeiformia
- Family: Scarabaeidae
- Genus: Neoserica
- Species: N. major

Binomial name
- Neoserica major (Arrow, 1946)

Synonyms
- Aserica major Arrow, 1946

= Neoserica major =

Species of beetle

Neoserica major is a species of beetle of the family Scarabaeidae. It is found in Myanmar.
