= Dicranocnemus sulcicollis =

Scientific classification
- Kingdom: Animalia
- Phylum: Arthropoda
- Class: Insecta
- Order: Coleoptera
- Suborder: Polyphaga
- Infraorder: Scarabaeiformia
- Family: Scarabaeidae
- Genus: Dicranocnemus
- Species: D. sulcicollis

Binomial name
- Dicranocnemus sulcicollis (Wiedemann, 1821)

Synonyms
- Trichius sulcicollis Wiedemann, 1821

Species of beetle

Dicranocnemus sulcicollis is a species of beetle of the family Scarabaeidae. It is found in South Africa (Western Cape, Northern Cape).

== Description ==
Adults reach a length of about 4.75–6.5 mm (0.187–0.256 in). Males are black, with the elytra fulvous and having on each side three somewhat broad bands of golden-yellow round scales, the two discoidal bands are sometimes not interrupted in the middle, but oftener than not the median one is so, and the sutural one is interrupted at about the median part, this interrupted part forms thus a quadrangular patch. The head is very rugose, and clothed with a flavescent pubescence. The pronotum is conspicuously convex in the posterior part, scabroso-punctate in the anterior part only, punctate on the rest of the surface, and clothed with a very long and very dense, erect, flavous pubescence, it is distinctly grooved longitudinally, and this groove is partly filled with squamose yellow hairs which form also a somewhat broad band along the base. The scutellum is clothed with appressed hairs. The elytra are very closely punctulate, not costulate, sinuate laterally and distinctly attenuate towards the apex, the basal part is pubescent, and the scales forming the two bands and the median transverse patch are round and very closely set. The pygidial part and abdomen are clothed with thick lanuginose yellow hairs. Females are similar to males, but the pronotum is less densely villose, and less squamose along the base, but the vestiture of the elytra and underneath is similar.

== Subspecies ==
- Dicranocnemus sulcicollis sulcicollis (Western Cape)
- Dicranocnemus sulcicollis furschi Schein, 1958 (Western Cape)
- Dicranocnemus sulcicollis niger Schein, 1958 (Northern Cape, Western Cape)
