= Hyposerica rufina =

Scientific classification
- Kingdom: Animalia
- Phylum: Arthropoda
- Class: Insecta
- Order: Coleoptera
- Suborder: Polyphaga
- Infraorder: Scarabaeiformia
- Family: Scarabaeidae
- Genus: Hyposerica
- Species: H. rufina

Binomial name
- Hyposerica rufina (Burmeister, 1855)

Synonyms
- Serica rufina Burmeister, 1855

Species of beetle

Hyposerica rufina is a species of beetle of the family Scarabaeidae. It is found in Madagascar.

== Description ==
Adults reach a length of about 7 mm. They are shiny, uniformly chestnut brown, with a smooth clypeus and a very fine transverse ridge before the elytral. The clypeus is much less wide, the sides less conical, distinctly margined, slightly tuberculate before the middle, smooth with a few faint punctures. The frons almost smooth, with a group of distinct setae behind the suture. The pronotum is projecting forward in the middle anteriorly, finely margined at the sides, uniformly widened posteriorly, the hind angles slightly rounded, finely punctate. The scutellum is densely and finely punctate. The elytra are almost uniformly densely punctate, the punctures are fine, somewhat arranged in rows, and leave narrow, smooth, more or less distinct longitudinal lines without elevation. The pygidium is very finely punctate.
