= Hyposerica micans =

Scientific classification
- Kingdom: Animalia
- Phylum: Arthropoda
- Class: Insecta
- Order: Coleoptera
- Suborder: Polyphaga
- Infraorder: Scarabaeiformia
- Family: Scarabaeidae
- Genus: Hyposerica
- Species: H. micans

Binomial name
- Hyposerica micans (Klug, 1834)

Synonyms
- Serica micans Klug, 1834; Serica splendens Harold, 1869

Species of beetle

Hyposerica micans is a species of beetle of the family Scarabaeidae. It is found in Madagascar.

== Description ==
Adults reach a length of about 9 mm. They have a dark reddish-brown, oblong-oval, which is strongly purplish-shimmering and not as tomentose as related species. They are less opalescent underneath. The clypeus is broad, weakly margined, very densely punctate, with individual setae on each side and a weak, rounded raised area in the middle. The frons is broad and tomentose up to the suture. The pronotum is short, almost straight at the sides with fine setae, the anterior margin is weakly projecting in the middle, the anterior angles strongly prominent, the posterior angles broadly rounded, the surface finely punctate, with a slight impression in the middle. The elytra are somewhat coarsely punctate, weakly tomentose with three weakly distinct ribs, between which secondary ribs appear in the second and also the third interval, which are absent in the first broad interval next to the suture. The pygidium is pointed and finely punctate.
