= Hyposerica pierroni =

Scientific classification
- Kingdom: Animalia
- Phylum: Arthropoda
- Class: Insecta
- Order: Coleoptera
- Suborder: Polyphaga
- Infraorder: Scarabaeiformia
- Family: Scarabaeidae
- Genus: Hyposerica
- Species: H. pierroni

Binomial name
- Hyposerica pierroni Brenske, 1899

Species of beetle

Hyposerica pierroni is a species of beetle of the family Scarabaeidae. It is found in Madagascar.

== Description ==
Adults reach a length of about 8–9 mm. They are oval, glossy and brown, with the head and pronotum darker, the latter and the elytra with erect brown setae on the surface. The clypeus is large, strongly margined, with weak setae behind the anterior setae, the surface slightly convex, densely wrinkled-punctate, the frontal suture indistinct, with isolated setae behind it. The frons is very densely punctate. The pronotum is only slightly transverse, distinctly projecting anteriorly, drawn in anteriorly and posteriorly at the sides, therefore scarcely wider posteriorly than anteriorly, the posterior angles rectangular, the posterior margin distinctly bordered, the surface very densely and strongly punctate, on the anterior half covered with numerous coarser setae, so that the surface appears wrinkled here. The elytra are densely punctate, without a distinct suture in place of the ribs. Next to the suture and especially laterally, there are numerous setae. In front of the apex is a distinctly demarcated, fine transverse ridge. The pygidium is finely punctate.
