= Hyposerica goudoti =

Scientific classification
- Kingdom: Animalia
- Phylum: Arthropoda
- Class: Insecta
- Order: Coleoptera
- Suborder: Polyphaga
- Infraorder: Scarabaeiformia
- Family: Scarabaeidae
- Genus: Hyposerica
- Species: H. goudoti

Binomial name
- Hyposerica goudoti Brenske, 1899

Species of beetle

Hyposerica goudoti is a species of beetle of the family Scarabaeidae. It is found in Madagascar.

== Description ==
Adults reach a length of about 9.5 mm. They are brown below, very dark above and strongly tomentose, with the frons and legs shiny. It can be distinguished from similar species by the fact that the lateral margin does not gradually approach the tip of the elytra, but instead curves away from the margin again in a shallow arc in the middle. The clypeus is broad, poorly margined, rather coarsely punctate, with a few inconspicuous setae. The frons is partly shiny, with the two setae behind the slightly curved suture disappear among the other scarcely fainter punctures there. The pronotum has conspicuously broad, rounded hind angles. The scutellum is almost punctate in lateral rows. The elytra, apart from the lateral margin feature, have marginal setae and narrow, unpunctate stripes, which are, however, indistinctly bordered by rows of punctures.
