= Hyposerica delibuta =

Scientific classification
- Kingdom: Animalia
- Phylum: Arthropoda
- Class: Insecta
- Order: Coleoptera
- Suborder: Polyphaga
- Infraorder: Scarabaeiformia
- Family: Scarabaeidae
- Genus: Hyposerica
- Species: H. delibuta

Binomial name
- Hyposerica delibuta Brenske, 1899

Species of beetle

Hyposerica delibuta is a species of beetle of the family Scarabaeidae. It is found in Madagascar.

== Description ==
Adults reach a length of about 8 mm. The clypeus is very densely and coarsely wrinkled, so that no setate punctures protrude. The frons is densely punctured, the punctures are very strong, with several setate punctures along the suture. The pronotum is somewhat less broad, distinctly projecting anteriorly, drawn in anteriorly and posteriorly at the sides, slightly projecting in the middle, the posterior angles are right-angled, the surface is less densely and strongly punctured with a few weak setate punctures at the anterior margin, the posterior margin is distinctly bordered, the base is therefore slightly bulbous laterally, with a fine ring of hairs in front of the scutellum. The scutellum itself is finely pubescent laterally. The elytra are chestnut brown, rather finely, dull-punctate, with a smooth suture and individual narrow, very indistinct, smooth, non-raised lines, next to these and especially next to the suture with distinct setate punctures, and a weak transverse ridge in front of the apex. The pygidium is glossy smooth and very finely punctured.
