= Hyposerica grossa =

Scientific classification
- Kingdom: Animalia
- Phylum: Arthropoda
- Class: Insecta
- Order: Coleoptera
- Suborder: Polyphaga
- Infraorder: Scarabaeiformia
- Family: Scarabaeidae
- Genus: Hyposerica
- Species: H. grossa

Binomial name
- Hyposerica grossa (Blanchard, 1850)

Synonyms
- Emphania grossa Blanchard, 1850

Species of beetle

Hyposerica grossa is a species of beetle of the family Scarabaeidae. It is found in Madagascar.

== Description ==
Adults reach a length of about 12–13 mm. They are dark brown, glossy and strongly opalescent, with only the underside dull. The clypeus is broad, coarsely wrinkled and punctate, slightly convex in the middle, with a row of setae behind the slightly raised anterior margin, and also with two weak setae before the suture. The frons is finely and widely punctate, the vertex smooth. The pronotum is short and broad, projecting forward in the middle at the anterior margin, the sides very weakly rounded, distinctly setate, the posterior angles angular, with a very fine ring of hairs at the posterior margin in front of the scutellum, the surface is densely but somewhat dull punctate, the punctures are somewhat finer at the anterior and posterior margins, with a few weak setae on both sides. The scutellum is pointed and punctate laterally. The elytra are coarsely punctate, slightly wrinkled, but without a raised suture and without ribs. Instead, there are fine, indistinct and unclear longitudinal wrinkles and weak setae. The pygidium is dull, flat and without hairs.
