= Gilbert John Arrow =

English entomologist (1873-1948)

Gilbert John Arrow (20 December 1873 London - 5 October 1948) was an English entomologist.

Gilbert was the son of John Garner Arrow of Streatham, London. He initially trained as an architect but took an interest in insects from 1896 during which time he was a Deputy Keeper on the staff of the Natural History Museum in London from 1896 until 1938. He worked mainly on the Coleoptera and noted stridulation in the larvae and adults of Lamellicorn beetles.

== Works ==
In The Fauna of British India, Including Ceylon and Burma, published by the British government in India, he contributed:

- Lamellicornia 1. Cetoniinae and Dynastinae (1910)
- Lamellicornia 2. Rutelinae, Desmonycinae, Euchirinae (1917)
- Clavicornia : Erotylidae, Languriidae & Endomychidae (1925)
- Lamellicornia 3. Coprinae (1931)

Other (partial list)

- Sound-production in the lamellicorn beetles. Transactions of the Entomological Society of London (1904)
- On the characters and relationships of the less-known groups of Lamellicorn Coleoptera, with descriptions of new species of Hybosorinae, etc. Transactions of the Entomological Society of London 57: 479-507.(1909)
- Scarabaeidae: Pachypodinae, Pleocominae, Aclopinae, Glaphyrinae, Ochodaeinae, Orphninae, Idiostominae, Hybosorinae, Dynamopinae, Acanthocerinae, Troginae. Coleopterorum Catalogus pars 43, W. Junk, Berlin. 66 pp.(1912)
- A nomenclatural note (Coleopt.) Proceedings of the Entomological Society of London B. 9(1): 16. (1940).

== Sources ==
- Blair 1948: [Arrow, G. J.] - Entomologist's Monthly Magazine (3) 84
