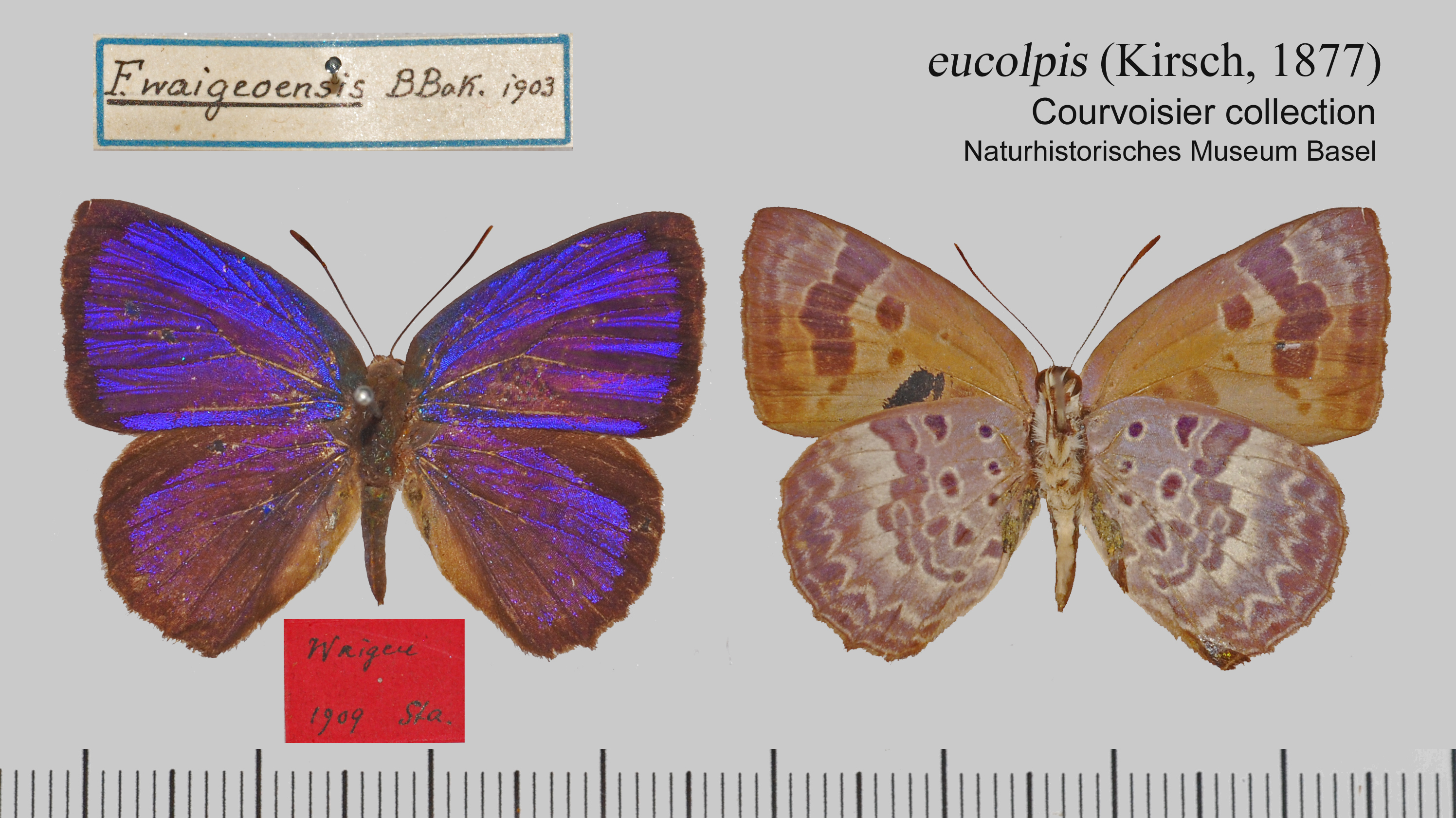
- Arhopala eucolpis eucolpis

Scientific classification
- Kingdom: Animalia
- Phylum: Arthropoda
- Clade: Pancrustacea
- Class: Insecta
- Order: Lepidoptera
- Family: Lycaenidae
- Genus: Arhopala
- Species: A. eucolpis

Binomial name
- Arhopala eucolpis (Kirsch, 1877)

Synonyms
- Amblypodia eucolpis Kirsch, 1877; Arhopala admete var. waigeoensis Bethune-Baker, 1903; Narathura admete sudesta Evans, 1957

= Arhopala eucolpis =

Species of butterfly

Arhopala eucolpis is a butterfly in the family Lycaenidae. It was described by Theodor Franz Wilhelm Kirsch in 1877. It is found in the Australasian realm. It may be a subspecies of Arhopala admete (Hewitson, 1863).

== Subspecies ==
- Arhopala eucolpis eucolpis (Waigeu, Misool, Jobi, West Irian to Papua, Goodenough, Yela, Tagula)
- Arhopala eucolpis sudesta (Evans, 1957) (Tagula, Yela)
