= Copelatus externus =

Scientific classification
- Domain: Eukaryota
- Kingdom: Animalia
- Phylum: Arthropoda
- Class: Insecta
- Order: Coleoptera
- Suborder: Adephaga
- Family: Dytiscidae
- Genus: Copelatus
- Species: C. externus

Binomial name
- Copelatus externus Kirsch, 1873

Species of beetle

Copelatus externus is a species of diving beetle. It is part of the genus Copelatus of the subfamily Copelatinae in the family Dytiscidae. It was described by Theodor Franz Wilhelm Kirsch in 1873.
