= Carphina petulans =

Scientific classification
- Kingdom: Animalia
- Phylum: Arthropoda
- Class: Insecta
- Order: Coleoptera
- Suborder: Polyphaga
- Infraorder: Cucujiformia
- Family: Cerambycidae
- Genus: Carphina
- Species: C. petulans

Binomial name
- Carphina petulans Kirsch, 1875

Species of beetle

Carphina petulans is a species of longhorn beetle of the subfamily Lamiinae. It was described by Theodor Franz Wilhelm Kirsch in 1875, and it is known from northern central Brazil, eastern Ecuador, French Guiana, Peru, and Bolivia.
