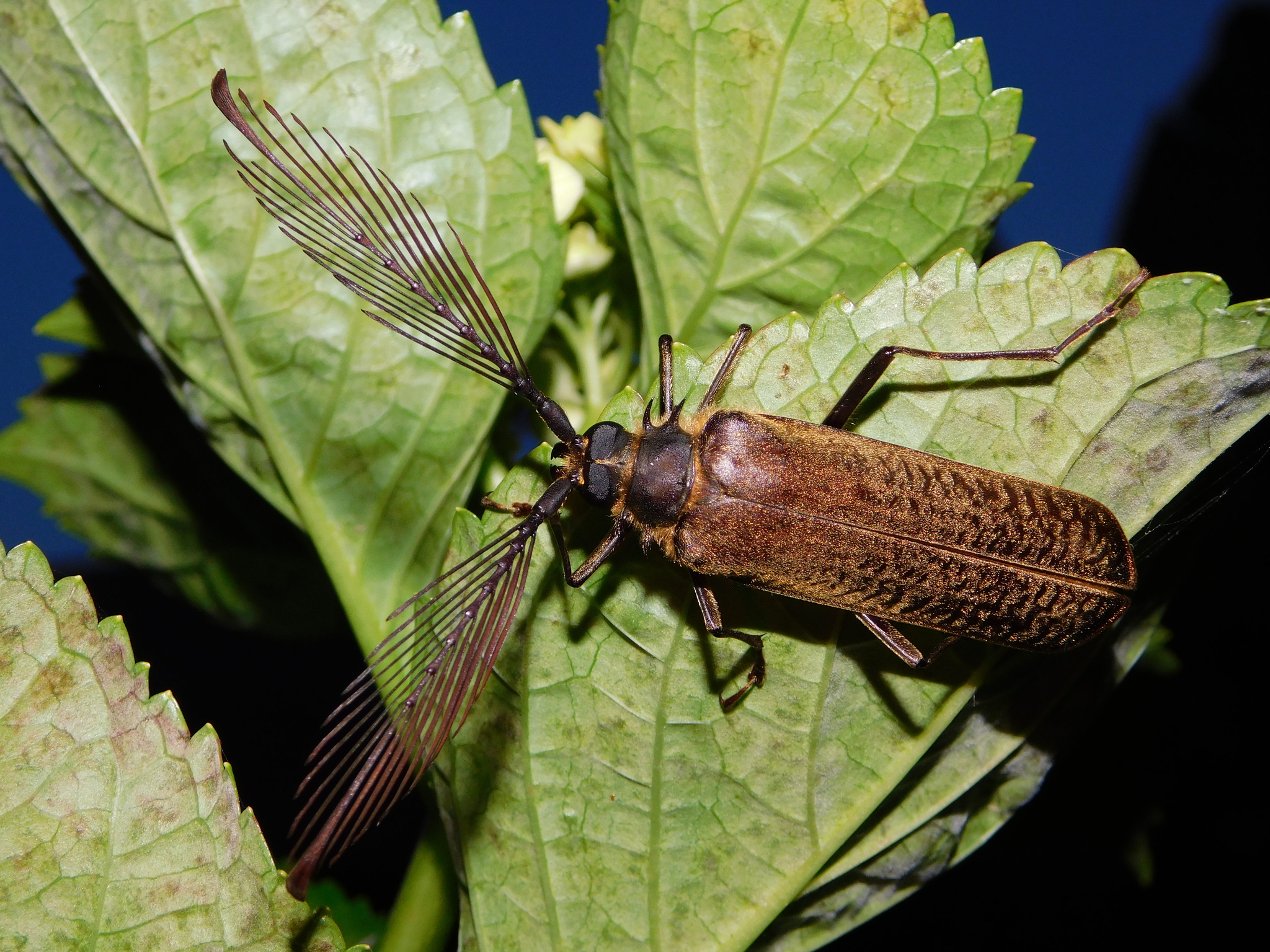
- Sarifer seabrai

Scientific classification
- Kingdom: Animalia
- Phylum: Arthropoda
- Class: Insecta
- Order: Coleoptera
- Suborder: Polyphaga
- Infraorder: Cucujiformia
- Family: Cerambycidae
- Subfamily: Prioninae
- Tribe: Meroscelisini
- Genus: Sarifer; Kirsch, 1870

= Sarifer =

Genus of beetles

Sarifer is a genus of beetles in the family Cerambycidae, containing the following species:

- Sarifer flavirameus Kirsch, 1870
- Sarifer seabrai Fragoso & Monné, 1982
