= Estola seriata =

Scientific classification
- Domain: Eukaryota
- Kingdom: Animalia
- Phylum: Arthropoda
- Class: Insecta
- Order: Coleoptera
- Suborder: Polyphaga
- Infraorder: Cucujiformia
- Family: Cerambycidae
- Genus: Estola
- Species: E. seriata

Binomial name
- Estola seriata Kirsch, 1875

Species of beetle

Estola seriata is a species of beetle in the family Cerambycidae. It was described by Theodor Franz Wilhelm Kirsch in 1875. It is known from Peru.
