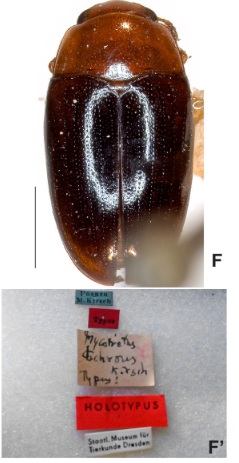

Scientific classification
- Kingdom: Animalia
- Phylum: Arthropoda
- Class: Insecta
- Order: Coleoptera
- Suborder: Polyphaga
- Infraorder: Cucujiformia
- Family: Erotylidae
- Genus: Mycotretus
- Species: M. dichrous

Binomial name
- Mycotretus dichrous Kirsch, 1876

= Mycotretus dichrous =

Species of beetle

Mycotretus dichrous is a species of beetle of the Erotylidae family. This species is found in Peru and central-western and northern Brazil.
