= Malthonea guttata =

Scientific classification
- Domain: Eukaryota
- Kingdom: Animalia
- Phylum: Arthropoda
- Class: Insecta
- Order: Coleoptera
- Suborder: Polyphaga
- Infraorder: Cucujiformia
- Family: Cerambycidae
- Genus: Malthonea
- Species: M. guttata

Binomial name
- Malthonea guttata (Kirsch, 1888)

Synonyms
- Parablabia guttata (Kirsch) Breuning, 1959; Ptericoptus guttatus Kirsch, 1889

Species of beetle

Malthonea guttata is a species of beetle in the family Cerambycidae. It was described by Theodor Franz Wilhelm Kirsch in 1888. It is known from Colombia and Ecuador.
