= Stenygra brevispinea =

Scientific classification
- Domain: Eukaryota
- Kingdom: Animalia
- Phylum: Arthropoda
- Class: Insecta
- Order: Coleoptera
- Suborder: Polyphaga
- Infraorder: Cucujiformia
- Family: Cerambycidae
- Genus: Stenygra
- Species: S. brevispinea

Binomial name
- Stenygra brevispinea Delfino, 1985

Species of beetle

Stenygra brevispinea is a species of beetle in the family Cerambycidae. It was described by Delfino in 1985.
