= Estola hispida =

Scientific classification
- Domain: Eukaryota
- Kingdom: Animalia
- Phylum: Arthropoda
- Class: Insecta
- Order: Coleoptera
- Suborder: Polyphaga
- Infraorder: Cucujiformia
- Family: Cerambycidae
- Genus: Estola
- Species: E. hispida

Binomial name
- Estola hispida Lameere, 1893

Species of beetle

Estola hispida is a species of beetle in the family Cerambycidae. It was described by Lameere in 1893. It is known from Venezuela.
