= Carphina elliptica =

Scientific classification
- Kingdom: Animalia
- Phylum: Arthropoda
- Class: Insecta
- Order: Coleoptera
- Suborder: Polyphaga
- Infraorder: Cucujiformia
- Family: Cerambycidae
- Genus: Carphina
- Species: C. elliptica

Binomial name
- Carphina elliptica (Germar, 1824)

Species of beetle

Carphina elliptica is a species of longhorn beetles of the subfamily Lamiinae. It was described by Ernst Friedrich Germar in 1824 and is known from southeastern Brazil.
