= Estola annulicornis =

Scientific classification
- Domain: Eukaryota
- Kingdom: Animalia
- Phylum: Arthropoda
- Class: Insecta
- Order: Coleoptera
- Suborder: Polyphaga
- Infraorder: Cucujiformia
- Family: Cerambycidae
- Genus: Estola
- Species: E. annulicornis

Binomial name
- Estola annulicornis Fisher, 1942

Species of beetle

Estola annulicornis is a species of beetle in the family Cerambycidae. It was described by Fisher in 1942. It is known from the Dominican Republic.
