= Estola daidalea =

Scientific classification
- Domain: Eukaryota
- Kingdom: Animalia
- Phylum: Arthropoda
- Class: Insecta
- Order: Coleoptera
- Suborder: Polyphaga
- Infraorder: Cucujiformia
- Family: Cerambycidae
- Genus: Estola
- Species: E. daidalea

Binomial name
- Estola daidalea Martins & Galileo, 2002

Species of beetle

Estola daidalea is a species of beetle in the family Cerambycidae. It was described by Martins and Galileo in 2002. It is known from Ecuador.
