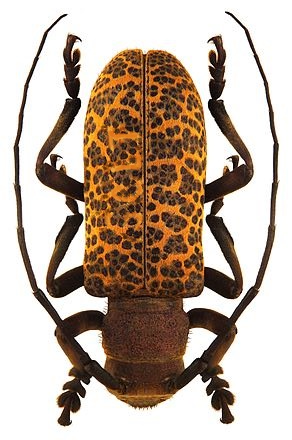
- Estola porcula

Scientific classification
- Kingdom: Animalia
- Phylum: Arthropoda
- Class: Insecta
- Order: Coleoptera
- Suborder: Polyphaga
- Infraorder: Cucujiformia
- Family: Cerambycidae
- Subfamily: Lamiinae
- Tribe: Desmiphorini
- Genus: Estola; Fairmaire & Germain, 1859

= Estola =

Genus of beetles

Estola is a genus of longhorn beetles of the subfamily Lamiinae, containing the following species:

- Estola acrensis Galileo & Martins, 2009
- Estola acricula Bates, 1866
- Estola affinis Breuning, 1940
- Estola albicans Breuning, 1940
- Estola albocincta Melzer, 1932
- Estola albomarmorata Breuning, 1943
- Estola albosetosa Breuning, 1940
- Estola albosignata Breuning, 1940
- Estola albosparsa Thomson, 1858
- Estola albostictica Breuning, 1940
- Estola albovaria Breuning, 1940
- Estola alternata Breuning, 1940
- Estola annulata (Fabricius, 1801)
- Estola annulicornis Fisher, 1942
- Estola annulipes Breuning, 1940
- Estola assimilis Breuning, 1940
- Estola attenuata Fisher, 1926
- Estola basiflava Breuning, 1943
- Estola basimaculata Breuning, 1940
- Estola basinotata Bates, 1866
- Estola benjamini Breuning, 1940
- Estola boliviana Breuning, 1940
- Estola brunnea Thomson, 1868
- Estola brunneovariegata Breuning, 1940
- Estola brunnescens Breuning, 1940
- Estola cayennensis Breuning, 1940
- Estola cerdai Martins & Galileo, 2009
- Estola cinerea Breuning, 1940
- Estola columbiana Breuning, 1940
- Estola compacta Breuning, 1940
- Estola crassepunctata Breuning, 1940
- Estola cuneata Breuning, 1940
- Estola daidalea Martins & Galileo, 2002
- Estola densepunctata Breuning, 1940
- Estola dilloni Zayas, 1975
- Estola diversemaculata Breuning, 1943
- Estola flavescens Breuning, 1940
- Estola flavobasalis Breuning, 1940
- Estola flavolineata Breuning, 1950
- Estola flavomarmorata Breuning, 1942
- Estola flavostictica Breuning, 1940
- Estola fratercula Galileo & Martins, 1999
- Estola freyi Breuning, 1955
- Estola fuscodorsalis Breuning, 1940
- Estola fuscomarmorata Breuning, 1940
- Estola fuscopunctata Breuning, 1943
- Estola fuscostictica Breuning, 1940
- Estola griseostictica Breuning, 1940
- Estola grisescens Breuning, 1940
- Estola hirsuta (DeGeer, 1775)
- Estola hirsutella Aurivillius, 1922
- Estola hispida Lameere, 1893
- Estola ignobilis Bates, 1872
- Estola insularis Blair, 1933
- Estola kuscheli Barriga, Moore & Capeda, 2005
- Estola lata Fuchs, 1974
- Estola longeantennata Breuning, 1940
- Estola m-flava Breuning, 1940
- Estola marmorata Breuning, 1940
- Estola medionigra Breuning, 1940
- Estola microphthalma Breuning, 1942
- Estola minor Breuning, 1940
- Estola misella Bates, 1885
- Estola nebulosa Breuning, 1940
- Estola nigrescens Breuning, 1943
- Estola nigrodorsalis Martins & Galileo, 2009
- Estola nigropunctata Breuning, 1940
- Estola nigrosignata Breuning, 1940
- Estola nodicollis Breuning, 1940
- Estola obliquata Breuning, 1940
- Estola obliquelineata Breuning, 1940
- Estola obscura (Fabricius, 1792)
- Estola obscurella Monné & Giesbert, 1992
- Estola obscuroides Breuning, 1942
- Estola operosa Martins & Galileo, 2007
- Estola parvula Breuning, 1940
- Estola porcula Bates, 1866
- Estola retrospinosa Breuning, 1940
- Estola rogueti Chalumeau & Touroult, 2005
- Estola rufa Breuning, 1940
- Estola ruficeps Breuning, 1943
- Estola seriata Kirsch, 1875
- Estola similis Breuning, 1940
- Estola stramentosa Breuning, 1940
- Estola strandi Breuning, 1940
- Estola strandiella Breuning, 1942
- Estola subannulicornis Breuning, 1963
- Estola timbauba Martins & Galileo, 2006
- Estola trinidadensis Breuning, 1955
- Estola truncatella Bates, 1866
- Estola unicolor Fairmaire & Germain, 1859
- Estola varicornis Bates, 1866
- Estola variegata Bates, 1866
- Estola vittulata Bates, 1874
- Estola vulgaris Galileo & Martins, 1999
