= Stenygra angustata =

Scientific classification
- Kingdom: Animalia
- Phylum: Arthropoda
- Clade: Pancrustacea
- Class: Insecta
- Order: Coleoptera
- Suborder: Polyphaga
- Infraorder: Cucujiformia
- Family: Cerambycidae
- Genus: Stenygra
- Species: S. angustata

Binomial name
- Stenygra angustata (Olivier, 1790)

Species of beetle

Stenygra angustata is a species of beetle in the family Cerambycidae. It was described by Guillaume-Antoine Olivier in 1790.
