= Malthonea aurescens =

Scientific classification
- Kingdom: Animalia
- Phylum: Arthropoda
- Class: Insecta
- Order: Coleoptera
- Suborder: Polyphaga
- Infraorder: Cucujiformia
- Family: Cerambycidae
- Genus: Malthonea
- Species: M. aurescens

Binomial name
- Malthonea aurescens (Breuning, 1966)

Synonyms
- Blabia aurescens Breuning, 1966

Species of beetle

Malthonea aurescens is a species of beetle in the family Cerambycidae. It was described by Stephan von Breuning in 1966. It is known from Ecuador.
