= Carphina sigillata =

Scientific classification
- Kingdom: Animalia
- Phylum: Arthropoda
- Class: Insecta
- Order: Coleoptera
- Suborder: Polyphaga
- Infraorder: Cucujiformia
- Family: Cerambycidae
- Genus: Carphina
- Species: C. sigillata

Binomial name
- Carphina sigillata Monne, 1985

Species of beetle

Carphina sigillata is a species of longhorn beetle of the subfamily Lamiinae. It was described by Monne in 1985, and is known from northwestern Brazil.
