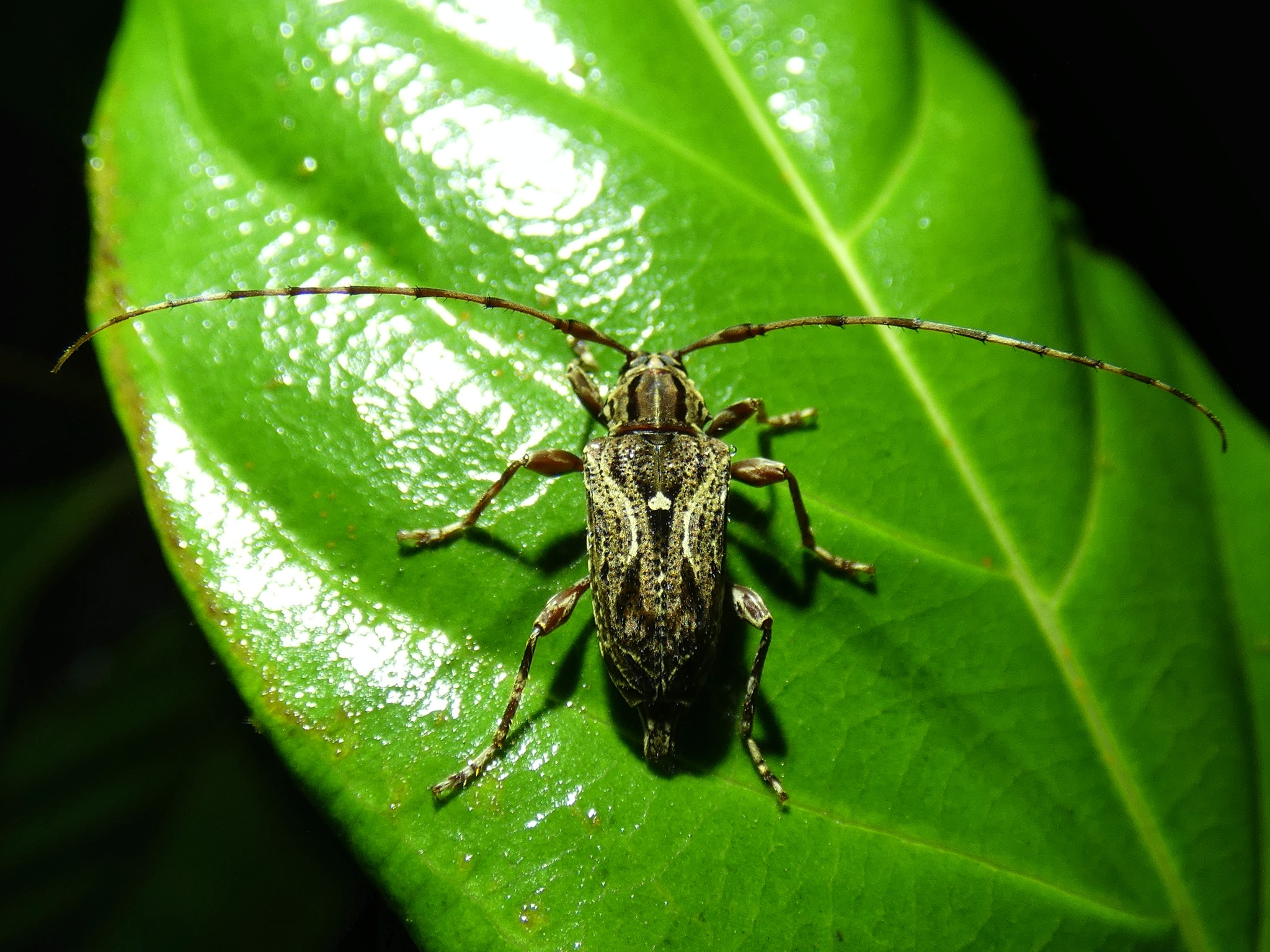

Scientific classification
- Kingdom: Animalia
- Phylum: Arthropoda
- Class: Insecta
- Order: Coleoptera
- Suborder: Polyphaga
- Infraorder: Cucujiformia
- Family: Cerambycidae
- Genus: Carphina
- Species: C. arcifera

Binomial name
- Carphina arcifera Bates, 1872

= Carphina arcifera =

Species of beetle

Carphina arcifera is a species of longhorn beetles of the subfamily Lamiinae. It was described by Henry Walter Bates in 1872, and is known from eastern Mexico to Panama.
