= Estola kuscheli =

Scientific classification
- Kingdom: Animalia
- Phylum: Arthropoda
- Class: Insecta
- Order: Coleoptera
- Suborder: Polyphaga
- Infraorder: Cucujiformia
- Family: Cerambycidae
- Genus: Estola
- Species: E. kuscheli

Binomial name
- Estola kuscheli Barriga et al., 2005

Species of beetle

Estola kuscheli is a species of beetle in the family Cerambycidae. It was described by Juan Barriga, Tomás Moore, and Danilo Cepeda in 2005. It is known from Chile.
