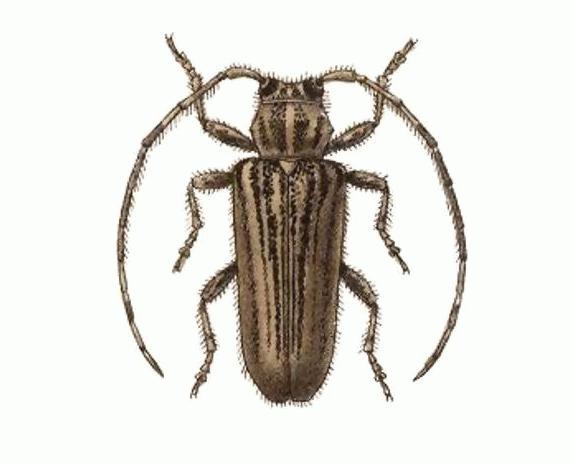

Scientific classification
- Domain: Eukaryota
- Kingdom: Animalia
- Phylum: Arthropoda
- Class: Insecta
- Order: Coleoptera
- Suborder: Polyphaga
- Infraorder: Cucujiformia
- Family: Cerambycidae
- Genus: Estola
- Species: E. vittulata

Binomial name
- Estola vittulata Bates, 1874

= Estola vittulata =

Species of beetle

Estola vittulata is a species of beetle in the family Cerambycidae. It was described by Henry Walter Bates in 1874. It is known from Panama, Mexico and Venezuela.
