= Estola unicolor =

Scientific classification
- Kingdom: Animalia
- Phylum: Arthropoda
- Class: Insecta
- Order: Coleoptera
- Suborder: Polyphaga
- Infraorder: Cucujiformia
- Family: Cerambycidae
- Genus: Estola
- Species: E. unicolor

Binomial name
- Estola unicolor Fairmaire & Germain, 1859

Species of beetle

Estola unicolor is a species of beetle in the family Cerambycidae. It was described by Fairmaire and Germain in 1859. It is known from Chile.
