= Carphina melanura =

Scientific classification
- Kingdom: Animalia
- Phylum: Arthropoda
- Class: Insecta
- Order: Coleoptera
- Suborder: Polyphaga
- Infraorder: Cucujiformia
- Family: Cerambycidae
- Genus: Carphina
- Species: C. melanura

Binomial name
- Carphina melanura Monne & Monne, 2007

Species of beetle

Carphina melanura is a species of longhorn beetles of the subfamily Lamiinae. It was described by Monne and Monne in 2007, and is known from Brazil.
