= Malthonea ruficornis =

Scientific classification
- Domain: Eukaryota
- Kingdom: Animalia
- Phylum: Arthropoda
- Class: Insecta
- Order: Coleoptera
- Suborder: Polyphaga
- Infraorder: Cucujiformia
- Family: Cerambycidae
- Genus: Malthonea
- Species: M. ruficornis

Binomial name
- Malthonea ruficornis Belon, 1903

Synonyms
- Parablabia ruficornis (Belon) Breuning, 1959

Species of beetle

Malthonea ruficornis is a species of beetle in the family Cerambycidae. It was described by Belon in 1903. It is known from Bolivia and Ecuador.
