= Estola boliviana =

Scientific classification
- Kingdom: Animalia
- Phylum: Arthropoda
- Class: Insecta
- Order: Coleoptera
- Suborder: Polyphaga
- Infraorder: Cucujiformia
- Family: Cerambycidae
- Genus: Estola
- Species: E. boliviana

Binomial name
- Estola boliviana Breuning, 1940

Species of beetle

Estola boliviana is a species of beetle in the family Cerambycidae. It was described by Stephan von Breuning in 1940 and is found in Bolivia.
