= Estola attenuata =

Scientific classification
- Domain: Eukaryota
- Kingdom: Animalia
- Phylum: Arthropoda
- Class: Insecta
- Order: Coleoptera
- Suborder: Polyphaga
- Infraorder: Cucujiformia
- Family: Cerambycidae
- Genus: Estola
- Species: E. attenuata

Binomial name
- Estola attenuata Fisher, 1926

Species of beetle

Estola attenuata is a species of beetle in the family Cerambycidae. It was described by Fisher in 1926. It is known from Jamaica.
