= Estola albosparsa =

Scientific classification
- Domain: Eukaryota
- Kingdom: Animalia
- Phylum: Arthropoda
- Class: Insecta
- Order: Coleoptera
- Suborder: Polyphaga
- Infraorder: Cucujiformia
- Family: Cerambycidae
- Genus: Estola
- Species: E. albosparsa

Binomial name
- Estola albosparsa Thomson, 1858

Species of beetle

Estola albosparsa is a species of beetle in the family Cerambycidae. It was described by Thomson in 1858. It is known from Brazil.
