= Estola timbauba =

Scientific classification
- Domain: Eukaryota
- Kingdom: Animalia
- Phylum: Arthropoda
- Class: Insecta
- Order: Coleoptera
- Suborder: Polyphaga
- Infraorder: Cucujiformia
- Family: Cerambycidae
- Genus: Estola
- Species: E. timbauba

Binomial name
- Estola timbauba Martins & Galileo, 2006

Species of beetle

Estola timbauba is a species of beetle in the family Cerambycidae. It was described by Martins and Galileo in 2006. It is known from Bolivia.
