= Malthonea glaucina =

Scientific classification
- Domain: Eukaryota
- Kingdom: Animalia
- Phylum: Arthropoda
- Class: Insecta
- Order: Coleoptera
- Suborder: Polyphaga
- Infraorder: Cucujiformia
- Family: Cerambycidae
- Genus: Malthonea
- Species: M. glaucina

Binomial name
- Malthonea glaucina (Thomson, 1868)

Synonyms
- Blabia glaucina Breuning, 1963; Prymnopteryx glaucina Thomson, 1868

Species of beetle

Malthonea glaucina is a species of beetle in the family Cerambycidae. It was described by Thomson in 1868. It is known from Ecuador and Venezuela.
