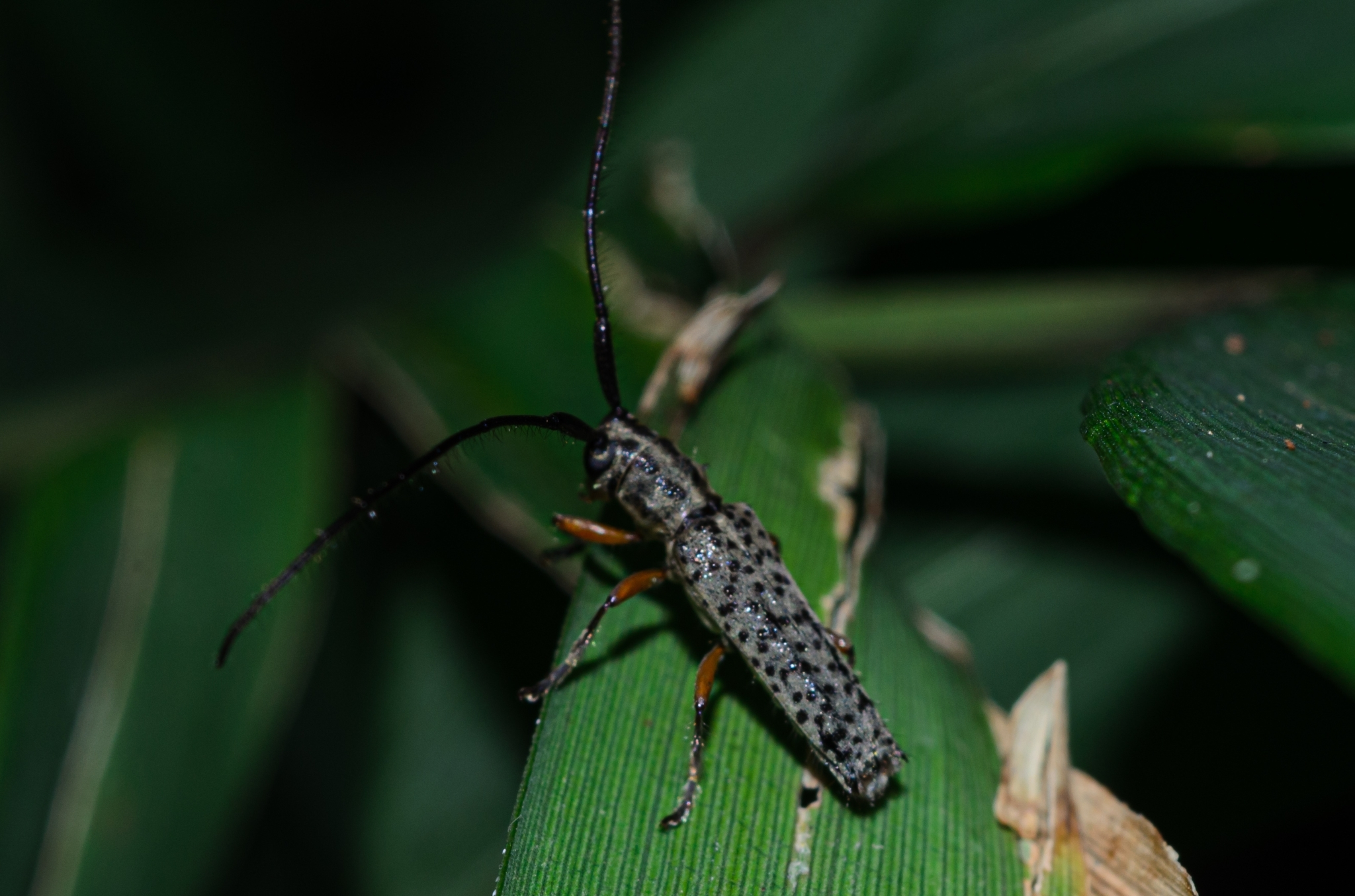

Scientific classification
- Kingdom: Animalia
- Phylum: Arthropoda
- Clade: Pancrustacea
- Class: Insecta
- Order: Coleoptera
- Suborder: Polyphaga
- Infraorder: Cucujiformia
- Family: Cerambycidae
- Genus: Malthonea
- Species: M. tigrinata

Binomial name
- Malthonea tigrinata Thomson, 1864

Synonyms
- Blabia tigrinata Breuning, 1963

= Malthonea tigrinata =

Species of beetle

Malthonea tigrinata is a species of beetle in the family Cerambycidae. It is found in Brazil (Bahia, Minas Gerais, Espírito Santo, Rio de Janeiro, São Paulo, Paraná, Santa Catarina, Rio Grande do Sul), Argentina (Misiones) and Paraguay.
