= Estola acrensis =

Scientific classification
- Domain: Eukaryota
- Kingdom: Animalia
- Phylum: Arthropoda
- Class: Insecta
- Order: Coleoptera
- Suborder: Polyphaga
- Infraorder: Cucujiformia
- Family: Cerambycidae
- Genus: Estola
- Species: E. acrensis

Binomial name
- Estola acrensis Galileo & Martins, 2009

Species of beetle

Estola acrensis is a species of beetle in the family Cerambycidae. It was described by Galileo and Martins in 2009. It is known from Brazil.
