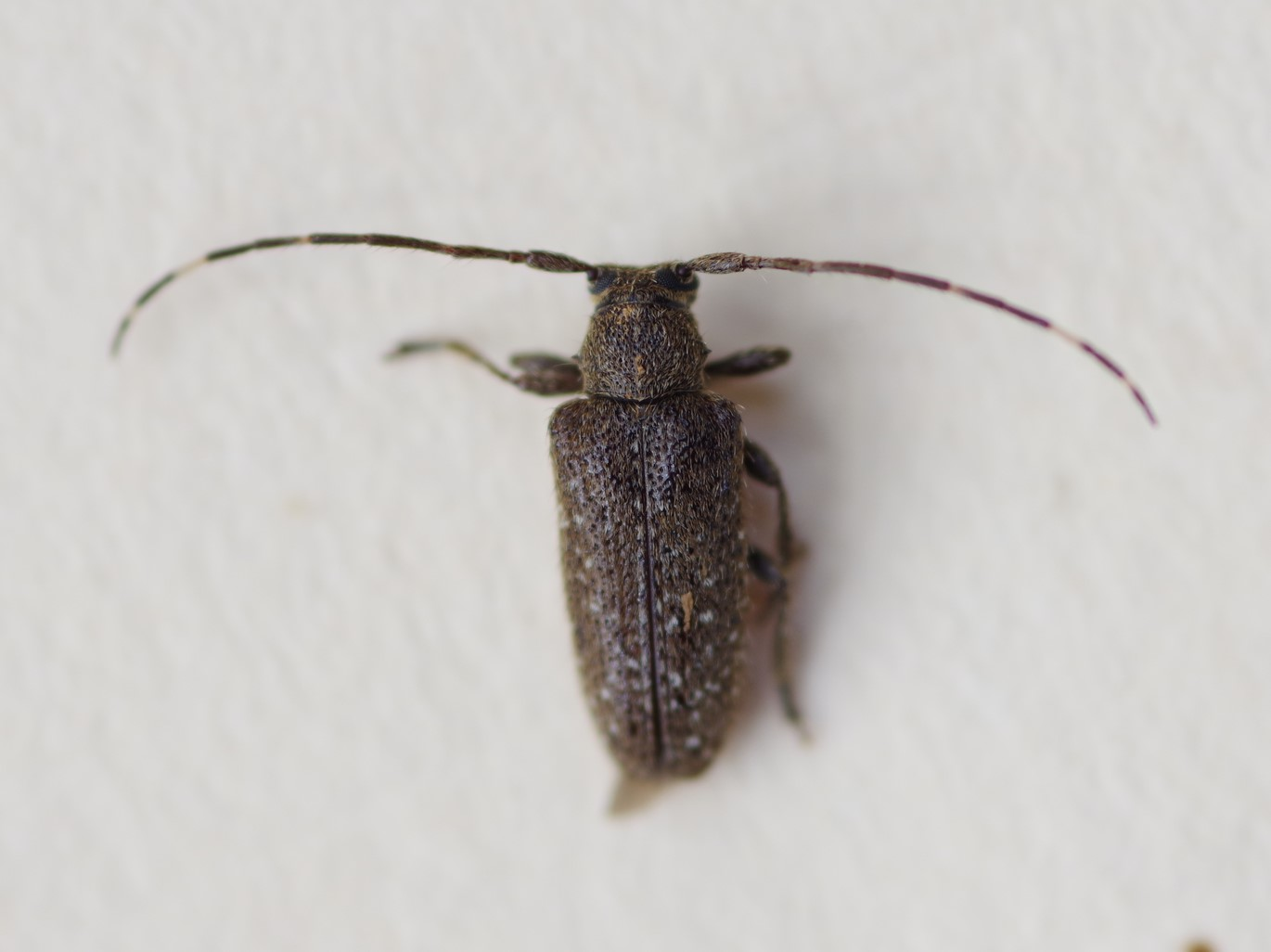

Scientific classification
- Kingdom: Animalia
- Phylum: Arthropoda
- Clade: Pancrustacea
- Class: Insecta
- Order: Coleoptera
- Suborder: Polyphaga
- Infraorder: Cucujiformia
- Family: Cerambycidae
- Genus: Estola
- Species: E. strandiella

Binomial name
- Estola strandiella Breuning, 1942

= Estola strandiella =

Species of beetle

Estola strandiella is a species of longhorn beetle that belongs to the tribe Desmiphorini. It is known from Costa Rica.

It was first described in 1942 by Stephan von Breuning, an Australian entomologist who specialized in the study of beetles.
