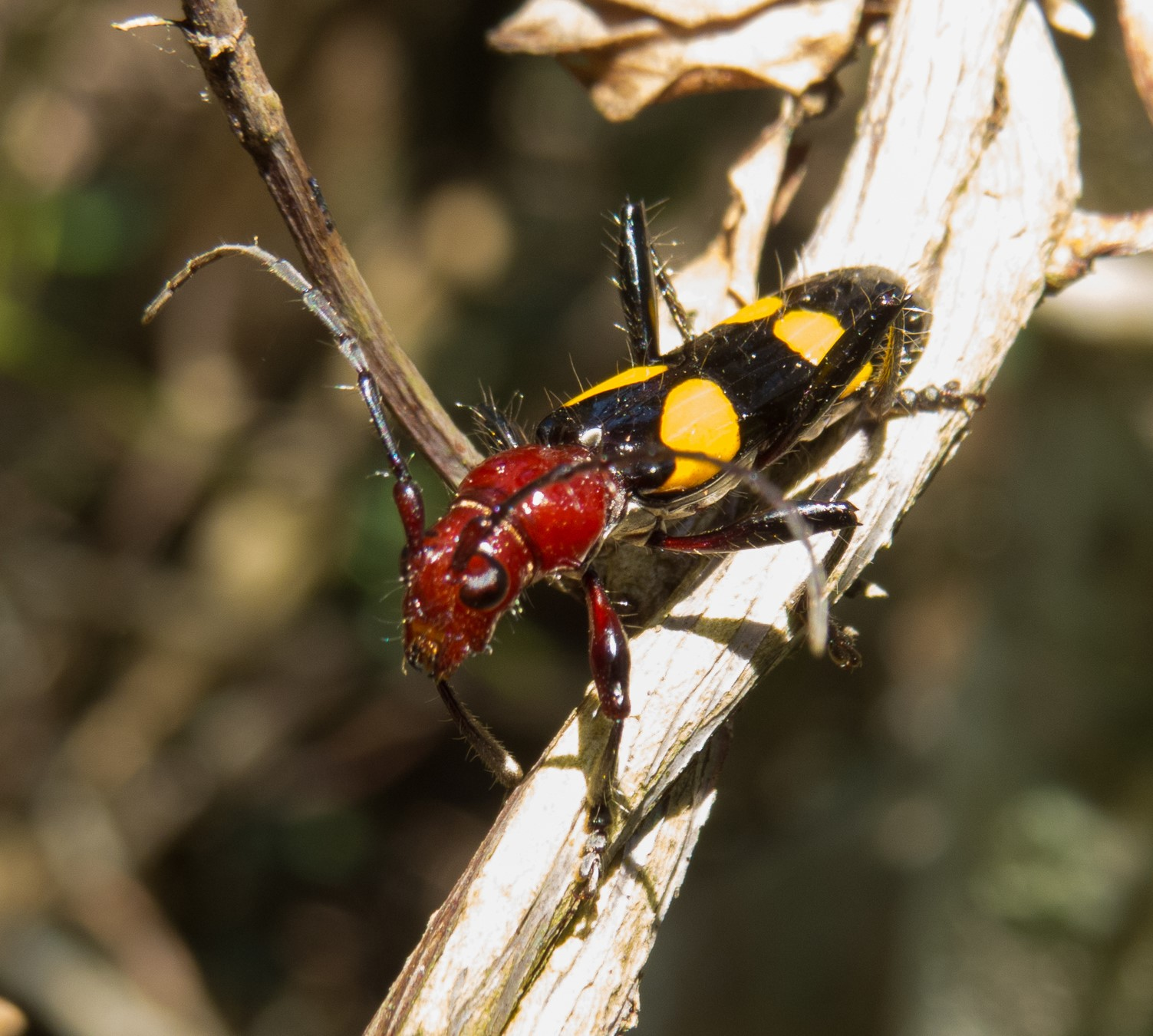

Scientific classification
- Domain: Eukaryota
- Kingdom: Animalia
- Phylum: Arthropoda
- Class: Insecta
- Order: Coleoptera
- Suborder: Polyphaga
- Infraorder: Cucujiformia
- Family: Cerambycidae
- Genus: Stenygra
- Species: S. setigera

Binomial name
- Stenygra setigera (Germar, 1824)

= Stenygra setigera =

Species of beetle

Stenygra setigera is a species of beetle in the family Cerambycidae. It was described by Ernst Friedrich Germar in 1824.
