= Carphina occulta =

Scientific classification
- Kingdom: Animalia
- Phylum: Arthropoda
- Class: Insecta
- Order: Coleoptera
- Suborder: Polyphaga
- Infraorder: Cucujiformia
- Family: Cerambycidae
- Genus: Carphina
- Species: C. occulta

Binomial name
- Carphina occulta Monne, 1990

Species of beetle

Carphina occulta is a species of longhorn beetles of the subfamily Lamiinae. It was described by Monne in 1990, and was discovered in southeastern Brazil.
