= Estola hirsuta =

Scientific classification
- Domain: Eukaryota
- Kingdom: Animalia
- Phylum: Arthropoda
- Class: Insecta
- Order: Coleoptera
- Suborder: Polyphaga
- Infraorder: Cucujiformia
- Family: Cerambycidae
- Genus: Estola
- Species: E. hirsuta

Binomial name
- Estola hirsuta (DeGeer, 1775)

Species of beetle

Estola hirsuta is a species of beetle in the family Cerambycidae. It was described by DeGeer in 1775. It is known from Brazil, French Guiana, Panama, Guyana, and Suriname.
