= Estola flavomarmorata =

Scientific classification
- Kingdom: Animalia
- Phylum: Arthropoda
- Class: Insecta
- Order: Coleoptera
- Suborder: Polyphaga
- Infraorder: Cucujiformia
- Family: Cerambycidae
- Genus: Estola
- Species: E. flavomarmorata

Binomial name
- Estola flavomarmorata Breuning, 1942

Species of beetle

Estola flavomarmorata is a species of beetle in the family Cerambycidae most commonly found in Colombia and Venezuela. It was described by Stephan von Breuning in 1942.
