= Carphina ligneola =

Scientific classification
- Kingdom: Animalia
- Phylum: Arthropoda
- Class: Insecta
- Order: Coleoptera
- Suborder: Polyphaga
- Infraorder: Cucujiformia
- Family: Cerambycidae
- Genus: Carphina
- Species: C. ligneola

Binomial name
- Carphina ligneola (Bates, 1865)

Species of beetle

Carphina ligneola is a species of longhorn beetle of the subfamily Lamiinae. It was described by Henry Walter Bates in 1865, and is known from northern Brazil and French Guiana.
