= Malthonea spinosa =

Scientific classification
- Domain: Eukaryota
- Kingdom: Animalia
- Phylum: Arthropoda
- Class: Insecta
- Order: Coleoptera
- Suborder: Polyphaga
- Infraorder: Cucujiformia
- Family: Cerambycidae
- Genus: Malthonea
- Species: M. spinosa

Binomial name
- Malthonea spinosa Galileo & Martins, 1999

Species of beetle

Malthonea spinosa is a species of beetle in the family Cerambycidae. It was described by Galileo and Martins in 1999. It is known from Colombia.
