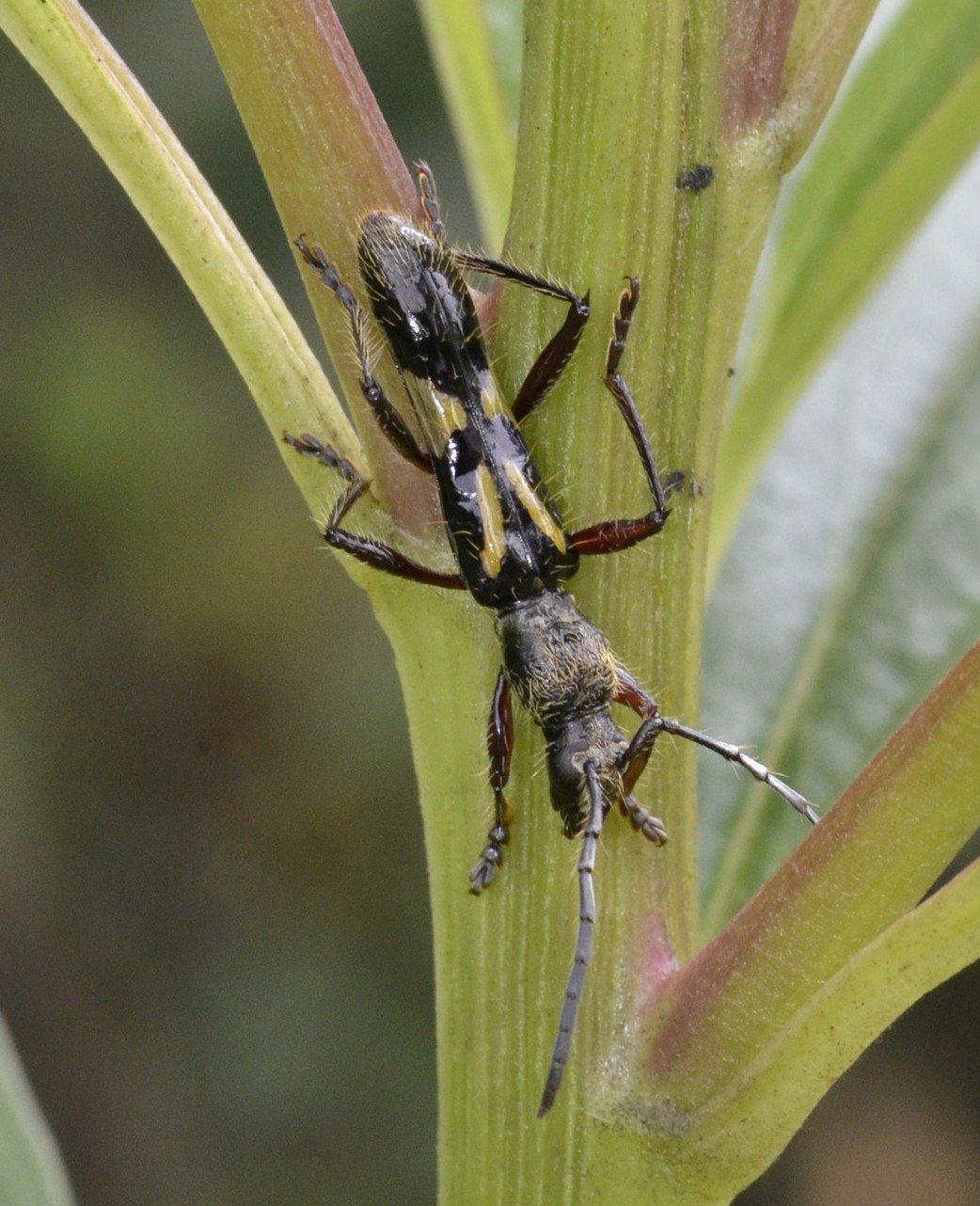

Scientific classification
- Domain: Eukaryota
- Kingdom: Animalia
- Phylum: Arthropoda
- Class: Insecta
- Order: Coleoptera
- Suborder: Polyphaga
- Infraorder: Cucujiformia
- Family: Cerambycidae
- Genus: Stenygra
- Species: S. holmgreni

Binomial name
- Stenygra holmgreni Aurivillius, 1908

= Stenygra holmgreni =

Species of beetle

Stenygra holmgreni is a species of beetle in the family Cerambycidae. It was described by Per Olof Christopher Aurivillius in 1908.
