= Malthonea cuprascens =

Scientific classification
- Domain: Eukaryota
- Kingdom: Animalia
- Phylum: Arthropoda
- Class: Insecta
- Order: Coleoptera
- Suborder: Polyphaga
- Infraorder: Cucujiformia
- Family: Cerambycidae
- Genus: Malthonea
- Species: M. cuprascens

Binomial name
- Malthonea cuprascens (Waterhouse, 1880)

Synonyms
- Calliphenges cuprascens Waterhouse, 1880

Species of beetle

Malthonea cuprascens is a species of beetle in the family Cerambycidae. It was described by Waterhouse in 1880. It has been known to inhabit Ecuador and Peru.
