= Estola hirsutella =

Scientific classification
- Kingdom: Animalia
- Phylum: Arthropoda
- Class: Insecta
- Order: Coleoptera
- Suborder: Polyphaga
- Infraorder: Cucujiformia
- Family: Cerambycidae
- Genus: Estola
- Species: E. hirsutella

Binomial name
- Estola hirsutella Aurivillius, 1922

Species of beetle

Estola hirsutella is a species of beetle in the family Cerambycidae. It was described by Per Olof Christopher Aurivillius in 1922 and is known from Chile.
