= Estola dilloni =

Scientific classification
- Kingdom: Animalia
- Phylum: Arthropoda
- Clade: Pancrustacea
- Class: Insecta
- Order: Coleoptera
- Suborder: Polyphaga
- Infraorder: Cucujiformia
- Family: Cerambycidae
- Genus: Estola
- Species: E. dilloni

Binomial name
- Estola dilloni Zayas, 1975

Species of beetle

Estola dilloni is a species of beetle in the family Cerambycidae. It was described by Zayas in 1975. It is known from Cuba.
