= Estola columbiana =

Scientific classification
- Kingdom: Animalia
- Phylum: Arthropoda
- Class: Insecta
- Order: Coleoptera
- Suborder: Polyphaga
- Infraorder: Cucujiformia
- Family: Cerambycidae
- Genus: Estola
- Species: E. columbiana

Binomial name
- Estola columbiana Breuning, 1940

Species of beetle

Estola columbiana is a species of beetle in the family Cerambycidae. It was described by Stephan von Breuning in 1940. It is known from Colombia, from which its species epithet is derived.
