= Estola lata =

Scientific classification
- Domain: Eukaryota
- Kingdom: Animalia
- Phylum: Arthropoda
- Class: Insecta
- Order: Coleoptera
- Suborder: Polyphaga
- Infraorder: Cucujiformia
- Family: Cerambycidae
- Genus: Estola
- Species: E. lata

Binomial name
- Estola lata E. Fuchs, 1974

Species of beetle

Estola lata is a species of beetle in the family Cerambycidae. It was described by Ernst Fuchs in 1974. It is known from Brazil.
