= Estola albocincta =

Scientific classification
- Kingdom: Animalia
- Phylum: Arthropoda
- Class: Insecta
- Order: Coleoptera
- Suborder: Polyphaga
- Infraorder: Cucujiformia
- Family: Cerambycidae
- Genus: Estola
- Species: E. albocincta

Binomial name
- Estola albocincta Melzer, 1932

Species of beetle

Estola albocincta is a species of beetle in the family Cerambycidae. It was described by Melzer in 1932. It is known from Brazil and Paraguay.
