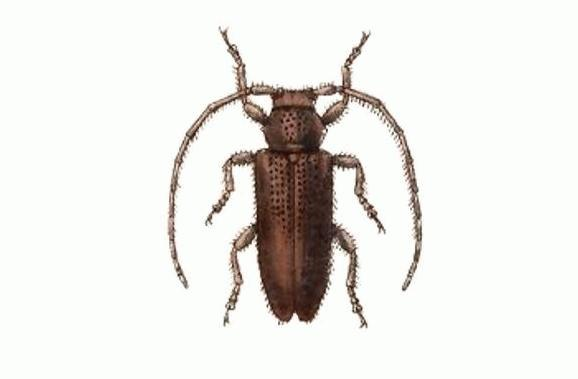

Scientific classification
- Domain: Eukaryota
- Kingdom: Animalia
- Phylum: Arthropoda
- Class: Insecta
- Order: Coleoptera
- Suborder: Polyphaga
- Infraorder: Cucujiformia
- Family: Cerambycidae
- Genus: Estola
- Species: E. ignobilis

Binomial name
- Estola ignobilis Bates, 1872

= Estola ignobilis =

Species of beetle

Estola ignobilis is a species of beetle in the family Cerambycidae. It was described by Bates in 1872. It is known from Panama, Mexico, Puerto Rico, and Venezuela.
