= Estola misella =

Scientific classification
- Domain: Eukaryota
- Kingdom: Animalia
- Phylum: Arthropoda
- Class: Insecta
- Order: Coleoptera
- Suborder: Polyphaga
- Infraorder: Cucujiformia
- Family: Cerambycidae
- Genus: Estola
- Species: E. misella

Binomial name
- Estola misella Bates, 1885

Species of beetle

Estola misella is a species of beetle in the family Cerambycidae. It was described by Bates in 1885. It is known from Guatemala, Honduras, and Panama.
