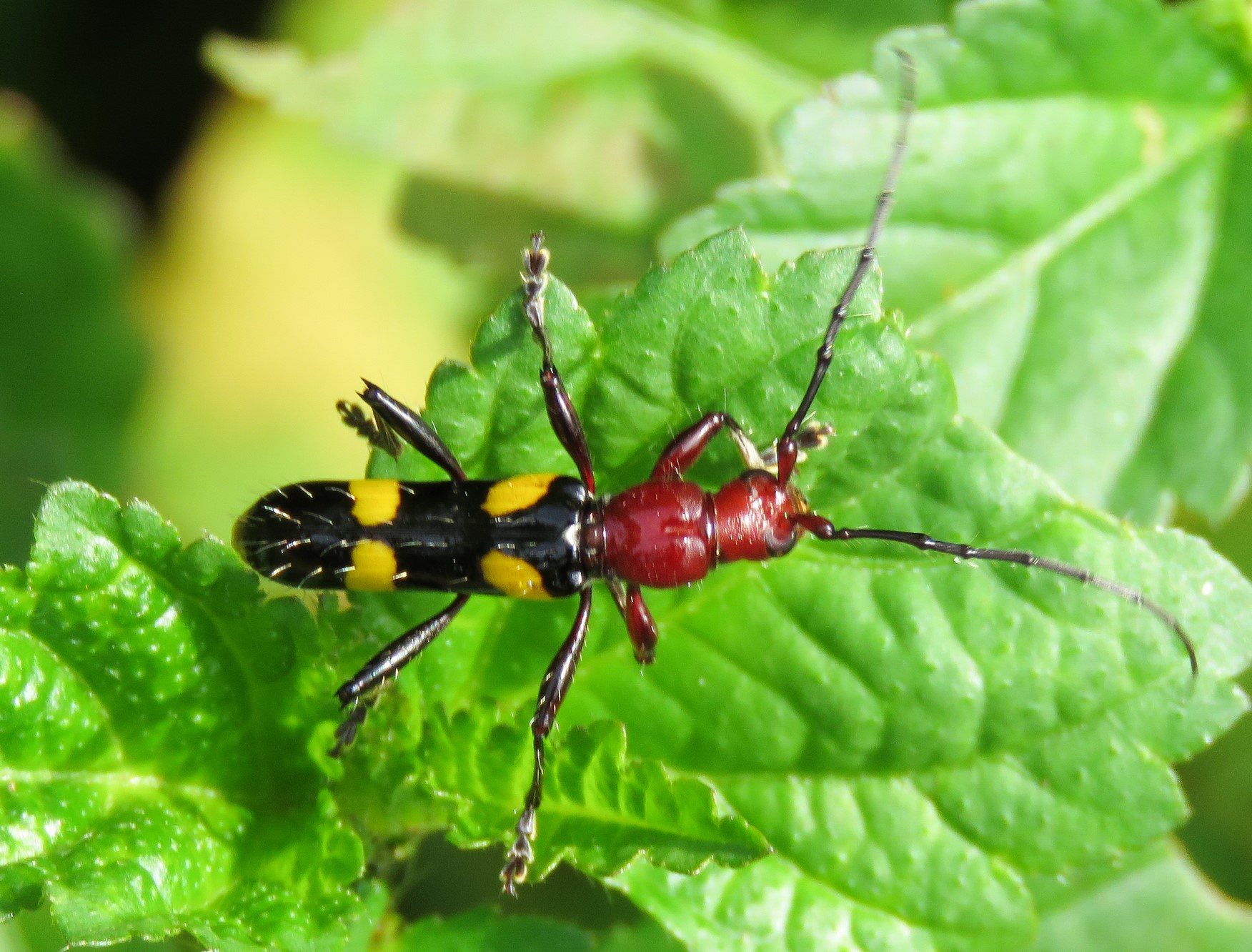
- Stenygra conspicua

Scientific classification
- Domain: Eukaryota
- Kingdom: Animalia
- Phylum: Arthropoda
- Class: Insecta
- Order: Coleoptera
- Suborder: Polyphaga
- Infraorder: Cucujiformia
- Family: Cerambycidae
- Subfamily: Cerambycinae
- Tribe: Hexoplonini
- Genus: Stenygra; Audinet-Serville, 1834

= Stenygra =

Genus of beetles

Stenygra is a genus of beetles in the family Cerambycidae, containing the following species:

- Stenygra angustata (Olivier, 1790)
- Stenygra apicalis Gounelle, 1911
- Stenygra brevispinea Delfino, 1985
- Stenygra conspicua (Perty, 1832)
- Stenygra contracta Pascoe, 1862
- Stenygra cosmocera White, 1855
- Stenygra euryarthron Delfino, 1985
- Stenygra globicollis Kirsch, 1889
- Stenygra histrio Audinet-Serville, 1834
- Stenygra holmgreni Aurivillius, 1908
- Stenygra seabrai Delfino, 1985
- Stenygra setigera (Germar, 1824)
