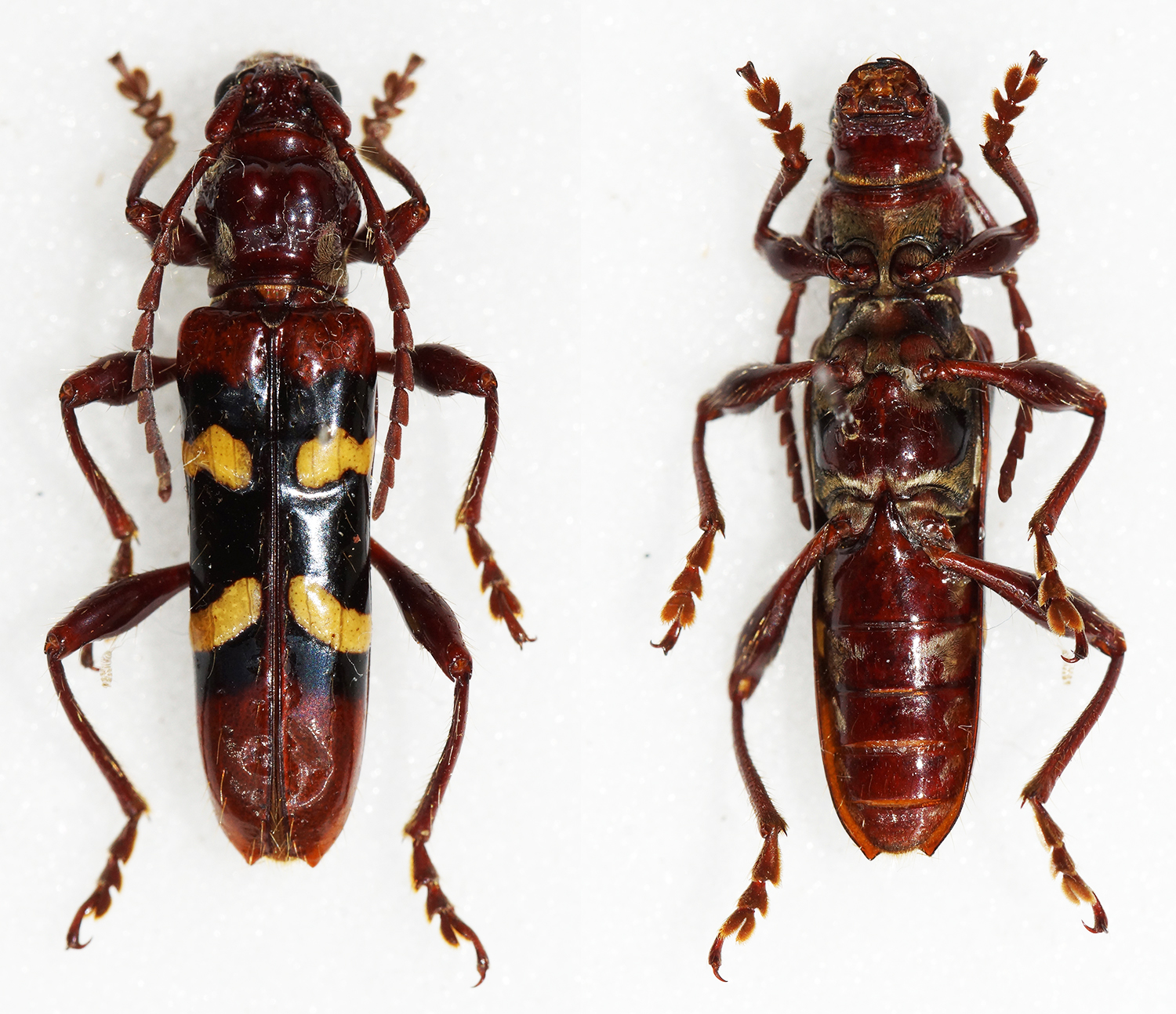

Scientific classification
- Domain: Eukaryota
- Kingdom: Animalia
- Phylum: Arthropoda
- Class: Insecta
- Order: Coleoptera
- Suborder: Polyphaga
- Infraorder: Cucujiformia
- Family: Cerambycidae
- Genus: Stenygra
- Species: S. histrio

Binomial name
- Stenygra histrio Audinet-Serville, 1834

= Stenygra histrio =

Species of beetle

Stenygra histrio is a species of beetle in the family Cerambycidae. It was described by Jean Guillaume Audinet-Serville in 1834.
