= Estola fuscodorsalis =

Scientific classification
- Kingdom: Animalia
- Phylum: Arthropoda
- Clade: Pancrustacea
- Class: Insecta
- Order: Coleoptera
- Suborder: Polyphaga
- Infraorder: Cucujiformia
- Family: Cerambycidae
- Genus: Estola
- Species: E. fuscodorsalis

Binomial name
- Estola fuscodorsalis Breuning, 1940

Species of beetle

Estola fuscodorsalis is a species of beetle in the family Cerambycidae. It was described by Stephan von Breuning in 1940. It is known to be from Brazil and Paraguay.
