= Estola rogueti =

Scientific classification
- Domain: Eukaryota
- Kingdom: Animalia
- Phylum: Arthropoda
- Class: Insecta
- Order: Coleoptera
- Suborder: Polyphaga
- Infraorder: Cucujiformia
- Family: Cerambycidae
- Genus: Estola
- Species: E. rogueti

Binomial name
- Estola rogueti Chalumeau & Touroult, 2005

Species of beetle

Estola rogueti is a species of beetle in the family Cerambycidae. It was described by Chalumeau and Touroult in 2005. It is known from Martinique.
