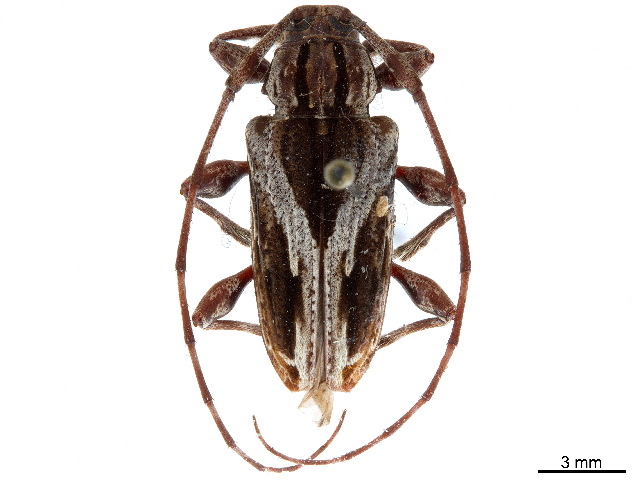

Scientific classification
- Kingdom: Animalia
- Phylum: Arthropoda
- Class: Insecta
- Order: Coleoptera
- Suborder: Polyphaga
- Infraorder: Cucujiformia
- Family: Cerambycidae
- Genus: Carphina
- Species: C. assula

Binomial name
- Carphina assula (Bates, 1864)

= Carphina assula =

Species of beetle

Carphina assula is a species of longhorn beetles of the subfamily Lamiinae. It was described by Henry Walter Bates in 1864, and is known from central Brazil, eastern Ecuador, and Peru.
