= Estola fratercula =

Scientific classification
- Domain: Eukaryota
- Kingdom: Animalia
- Phylum: Arthropoda
- Class: Insecta
- Order: Coleoptera
- Suborder: Polyphaga
- Infraorder: Cucujiformia
- Family: Cerambycidae
- Genus: Estola
- Species: E. fratercula

Binomial name
- Estola fratercula Galileo & Martins, 1999

Species of beetle

Estola fratercula is a species of beetle in the family Cerambycidae. It was described by Galileo and Martins in 1999. It is known from Colombia.
