= Malthonea phantasma =

Scientific classification
- Domain: Eukaryota
- Kingdom: Animalia
- Phylum: Arthropoda
- Class: Insecta
- Order: Coleoptera
- Suborder: Polyphaga
- Infraorder: Cucujiformia
- Family: Cerambycidae
- Genus: Malthonea
- Species: M. phantasma

Binomial name
- Malthonea phantasma Martins & Galileo, 1995

Species of beetle

Malthonea phantasma is a species of beetle in the family Cerambycidae. It was described by Martins and Galileo in 1995. It is known from Ecuador.
