= Estola insularis =

Scientific classification
- Domain: Eukaryota
- Kingdom: Animalia
- Phylum: Arthropoda
- Class: Insecta
- Order: Coleoptera
- Suborder: Polyphaga
- Infraorder: Cucujiformia
- Family: Cerambycidae
- Genus: Estola
- Species: E. insularis

Binomial name
- Estola insularis Blair, 1933

Species of beetle

Estola insularis is a species of beetle in the family Cerambycidae. It was described by Blair in 1933.

== Subspecies ==
- Estola insularis cribrata Blair, 1933
- Estola insularis duncani Van Dyke, 1953
- Estola insularis insularis Blair, 1933
- Estola insularis subnigrescens Breuning, 1974
