= Estola obscurella =

Scientific classification
- Domain: Eukaryota
- Kingdom: Animalia
- Phylum: Arthropoda
- Class: Insecta
- Order: Coleoptera
- Suborder: Polyphaga
- Infraorder: Cucujiformia
- Family: Cerambycidae
- Genus: Estola
- Species: E. obscurella

Binomial name
- Estola obscurella Monné & Giesbert, 1992

Species of beetle

Estola obscurella is a species of beetle in the family Cerambycidae. It was described by Monné and Giesbert in 1992. It is known from Brazil.
