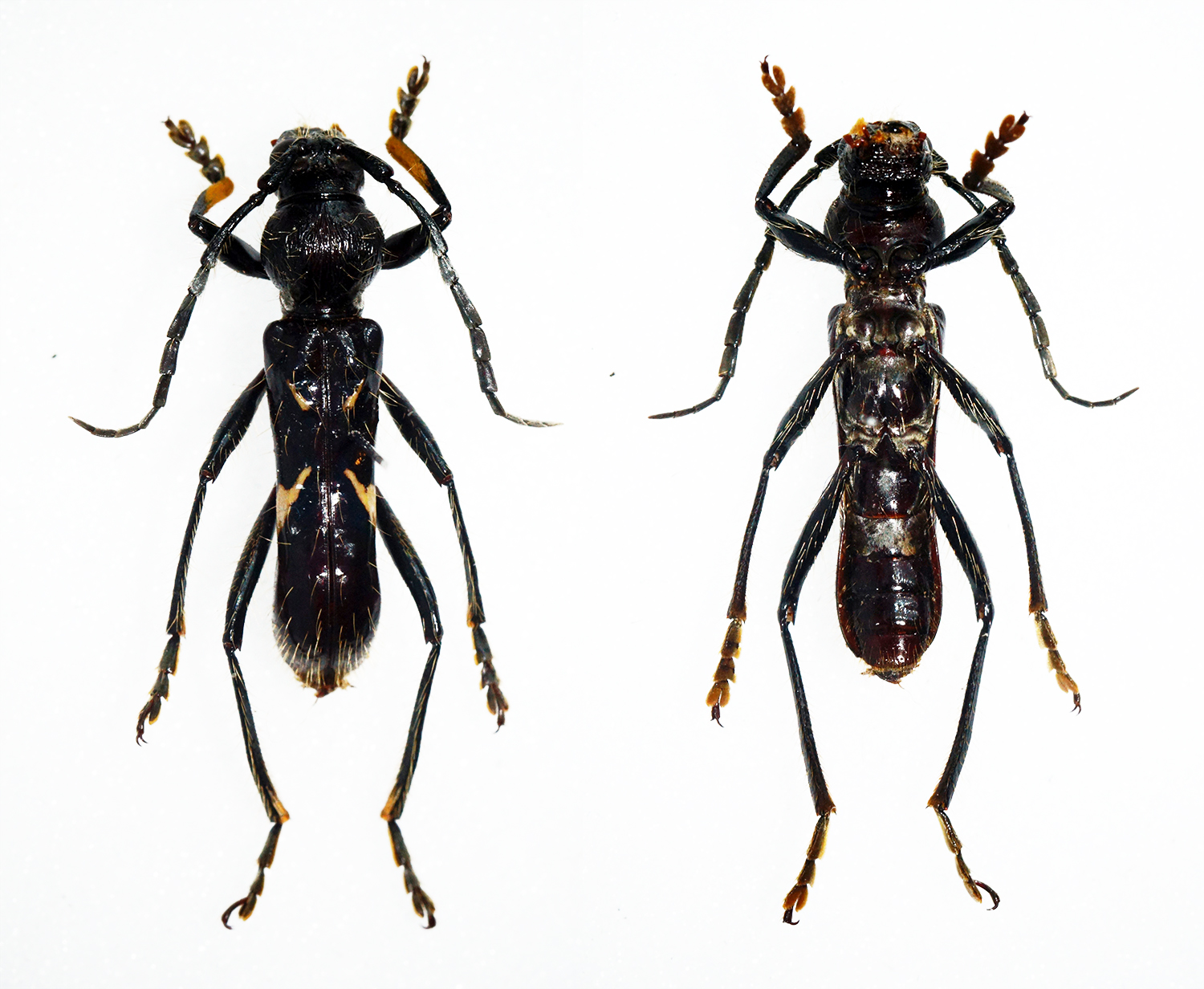

Scientific classification
- Domain: Eukaryota
- Kingdom: Animalia
- Phylum: Arthropoda
- Class: Insecta
- Order: Coleoptera
- Suborder: Polyphaga
- Infraorder: Cucujiformia
- Family: Cerambycidae
- Genus: Stenygra
- Species: S. contracta

Binomial name
- Stenygra contracta Pascoe, 1862

= Stenygra contracta =

Species of beetle

Stenygra contracta is a species of beetle in the family Cerambycidae. It was described by Pascoe in 1862.
