= Malthonea cumbica =

Scientific classification
- Domain: Eukaryota
- Kingdom: Animalia
- Phylum: Arthropoda
- Class: Insecta
- Order: Coleoptera
- Suborder: Polyphaga
- Infraorder: Cucujiformia
- Family: Cerambycidae
- Genus: Malthonea
- Species: M. cumbica

Binomial name
- Malthonea cumbica Galileo & Martins, 1996

Species of beetle

Malthonea cumbica is a species of beetle in the family Cerambycidae. It was described by Galileo and Martins in 1996. It is known from Venezuela.
