= Estola flavobasalis =

Scientific classification
- Kingdom: Animalia
- Phylum: Arthropoda
- Clade: Pancrustacea
- Class: Insecta
- Order: Coleoptera
- Suborder: Polyphaga
- Infraorder: Cucujiformia
- Family: Cerambycidae
- Genus: Estola
- Species: E. flavobasalis

Binomial name
- Estola flavobasalis Breuning, 1940

Species of beetle

Estola flavobasalis is a species of beetle in the family Cerambycidae. It was described by Stephan von Breuning in 1940. It is found in French Guiana, Bolivia (Santa Cruz) and Brazil (Goiás, Bahia, Minas Gerais, Espírito Santo, Rio de Janeiro, São Paulo, Paraná, Santa Catarina, Rio Grande do Sul).
