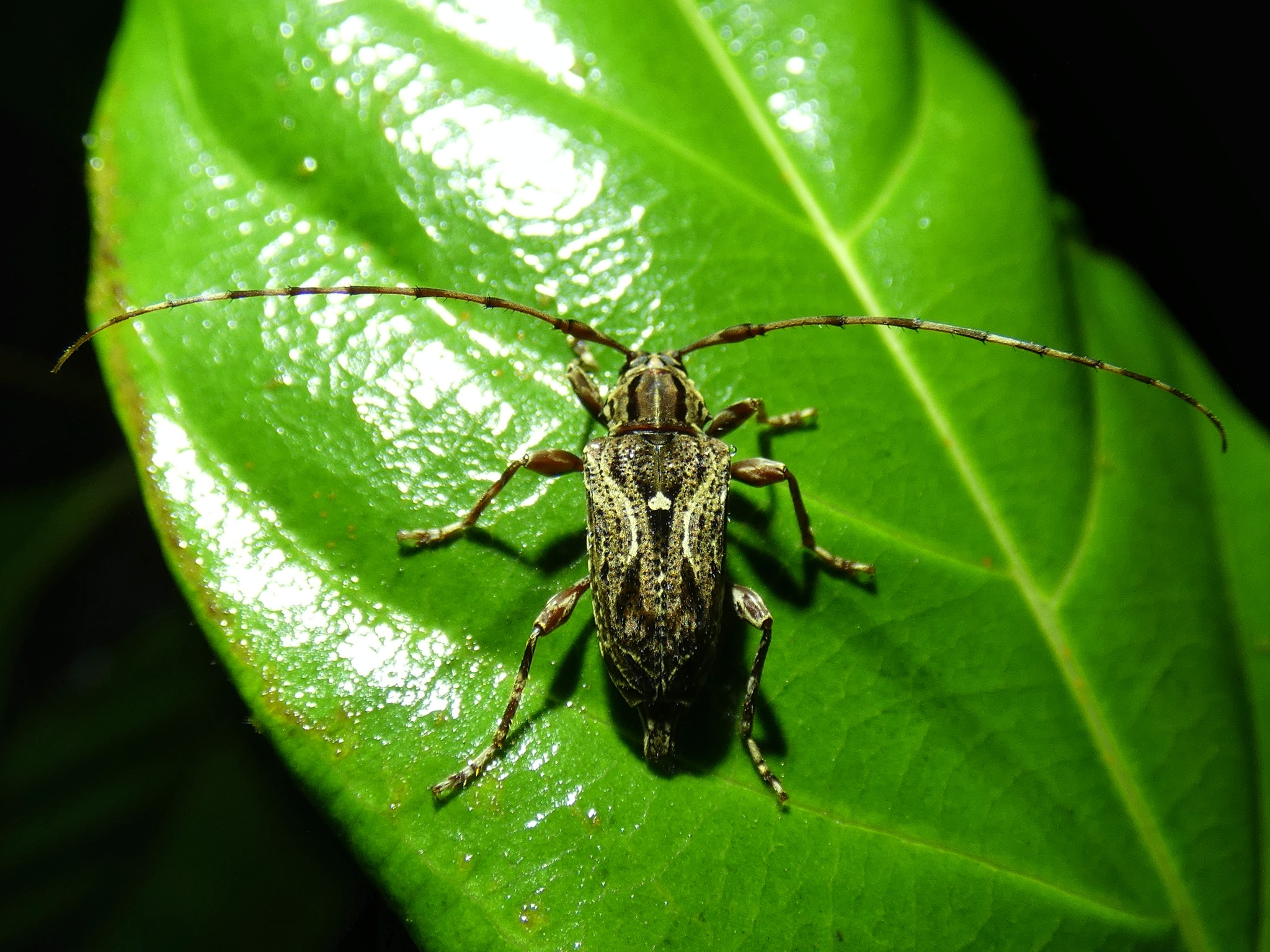
- Carphina arcifera

Scientific classification
- Kingdom: Animalia
- Phylum: Arthropoda
- Class: Insecta
- Order: Coleoptera
- Suborder: Polyphaga
- Infraorder: Cucujiformia
- Family: Cerambycidae
- Subfamily: Lamiinae
- Tribe: Acanthocinini
- Genus: Carphina; Bates, 1872

= Carphina =

Genus of beetles

Carphina is a genus of beetles in the family Cerambycidae, containing the following species:

- Carphina arcifera Bates, 1872
- Carphina assula (Bates, 1864)
- Carphina elliptica (Germar, 1824)
- Carphina ligneola (Bates, 1865)
- Carphina lignicolor (Bates, 1865)
- Carphina melanura Monne & Monne, 2007
- Carphina occulta Monné, 1990
- Carphina petulans Kirsch, 1875
- Carphina sigillata Monné, 1985
