= Malthonea albomaculata =

Scientific classification
- Kingdom: Animalia
- Phylum: Arthropoda
- Class: Insecta
- Order: Coleoptera
- Suborder: Polyphaga
- Infraorder: Cucujiformia
- Family: Cerambycidae
- Genus: Malthonea
- Species: M. albomaculata

Binomial name
- Malthonea albomaculata (Breuning, 1966)

Synonyms
- Blabia albomaculata Breuning, 1966

Species of beetle

Malthonea albomaculata is a species of beetle in the family Cerambycidae. It was described by Stephan von Breuning in 1966. It is known from Bolivia.
