= Estola nigrescens =

Scientific classification
- Kingdom: Animalia
- Phylum: Arthropoda
- Class: Insecta
- Order: Coleoptera
- Suborder: Polyphaga
- Infraorder: Cucujiformia
- Family: Cerambycidae
- Genus: Estola
- Species: E. nigrescens

Binomial name
- Estola nigrescens Breuning, 1943

Species of beetle

Estola nigrescens is a species of beetle in the family Cerambycidae. It was described by Stephan von Breuning in 1943. It is known from Venezuela.
