= Malthonea piraiuba =

Scientific classification
- Domain: Eukaryota
- Kingdom: Animalia
- Phylum: Arthropoda
- Class: Insecta
- Order: Coleoptera
- Suborder: Polyphaga
- Infraorder: Cucujiformia
- Family: Cerambycidae
- Genus: Malthonea
- Species: M. piraiuba

Binomial name
- Malthonea piraiuba Martins & Galileo, 2009

Species of beetle

Malthonea piraiuba is a species of beetle in the family Cerambycidae. It was described by Martins and Galileo in 2009.
