= Estola operosa =

Scientific classification
- Domain: Eukaryota
- Kingdom: Animalia
- Phylum: Arthropoda
- Class: Insecta
- Order: Coleoptera
- Suborder: Polyphaga
- Infraorder: Cucujiformia
- Family: Cerambycidae
- Genus: Estola
- Species: E. operosa

Binomial name
- Estola operosa Martins & Galileo, 2007

Species of beetle

Estola operosa is a species of beetle in the family Cerambycidae. It was described by Martins and Galileo in 2007. It is known from French Guiana.
