= Malthonea =

Scientific classification
- Kingdom: Animalia
- Phylum: Arthropoda
- Class: Insecta
- Order: Coleoptera
- Suborder: Polyphaga
- Infraorder: Cucujiformia
- Family: Cerambycidae
- Subfamily: Lamiinae
- Tribe: Desmiphorini
- Genus: Malthonea; Thomson, 1864

Genus of beetles

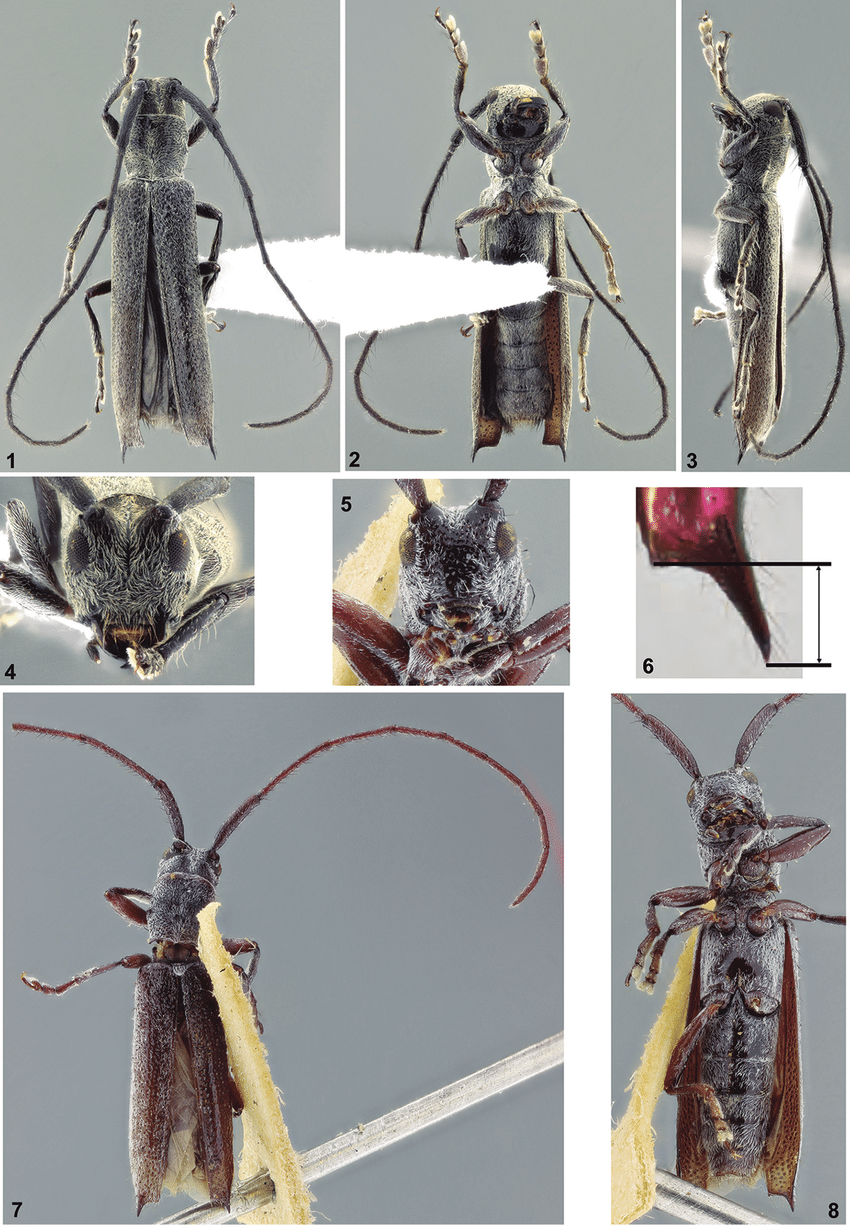
Malthonea keili

Malthonea is a genus of longhorn beetles of the subfamily Lamiinae, found in South America:

== Species ==
These 17 species belong to the genus Malthonea:

- Malthonea albomaculata (Breuning, 1966) (Bolivia)
- Malthonea aurescens (Breuning, 1966) (Ecuador)
- Malthonea cumbica Galileo & Martins, 1996 (Venezuela)
- Malthonea cuprascens (Waterhouse, 1880) (Ecuador, Peru)
- Malthonea glaucina (Thomson, 1868) (Ecuador, Venezuela)
- Malthonea guttata (Kirsch, 1889) (Colombia, Ecuador)
- Malthonea itaiuba Martins & Galileo, 1999 (Venezuela)
- Malthonea keili Santos-Silva, Galileo & McClarin, 2018 (Ecuador)
- Malthonea mimula Martins & Galileo, 1995 (Colombia)
- Malthonea minima Martins & Galileo, 1995 (Peru)
- Malthonea obyuna Martins & Galileo, 2005 (Peru)
- Malthonea panthera Martins & Galileo, 1995 (Colombia, Venezuela)
- Malthonea phantasma Martins & Galileo, 1995 (Ecuador)
- Malthonea piraiuba Martins & Galileo, 2009 (Costa Rica)
- Malthonea ruficornis Belon, 1903 (Bolivia, Ecuador)
- Malthonea spinosa Galileo & Martins, 1999 (Colombia)
- Malthonea tigrinata Thomson, 1864 (Argentina, Brazil)
