= Estola annulata =

Scientific classification
- Domain: Eukaryota
- Kingdom: Animalia
- Phylum: Arthropoda
- Class: Insecta
- Order: Coleoptera
- Suborder: Polyphaga
- Infraorder: Cucujiformia
- Family: Cerambycidae
- Genus: Estola
- Species: E. annulata

Binomial name
- Estola annulata (Fabricius, 1801)

Species of beetle

Estola annulata is a species of beetle in the family Cerambycidae. It was described by Johan Christian Fabricius in 1801. It is known from South America.
