= Malthonea mimula =

Scientific classification
- Domain: Eukaryota
- Kingdom: Animalia
- Phylum: Arthropoda
- Class: Insecta
- Order: Coleoptera
- Suborder: Polyphaga
- Infraorder: Cucujiformia
- Family: Cerambycidae
- Genus: Malthonea
- Species: M. mimula

Binomial name
- Malthonea mimula Martins & Galileo, 1995

Species of beetle

Malthonea mimula is a species of beetle in the family Cerambycidae. It was first described by Martins and Galileo in 1995. Its geographic range includes Colombia, and other countries in South America.
