= Estola obscura =

Scientific classification
- Kingdom: Animalia
- Phylum: Arthropoda
- Clade: Pancrustacea
- Class: Insecta
- Order: Coleoptera
- Suborder: Polyphaga
- Infraorder: Cucujiformia
- Family: Cerambycidae
- Genus: Estola
- Species: E. obscura

Binomial name
- Estola obscura (Fabricius, 1792)

Species of beetle

Estola obscura is a species of beetle in the family Cerambycidae. It was described by Johan Christian Fabricius in 1792. It is known from Brazil and French Guiana.
