= Malthonea minima =

Scientific classification
- Domain: Eukaryota
- Kingdom: Animalia
- Phylum: Arthropoda
- Class: Insecta
- Order: Coleoptera
- Suborder: Polyphaga
- Infraorder: Cucujiformia
- Family: Cerambycidae
- Genus: Malthonea
- Species: M. minima

Binomial name
- Malthonea minima Martins & Galileo, 1995

Species of beetle

Malthonea minima is a species of beetle in the family Cerambycidae. It was described by Martins and Galileo in 1995. It is known from Peru.
