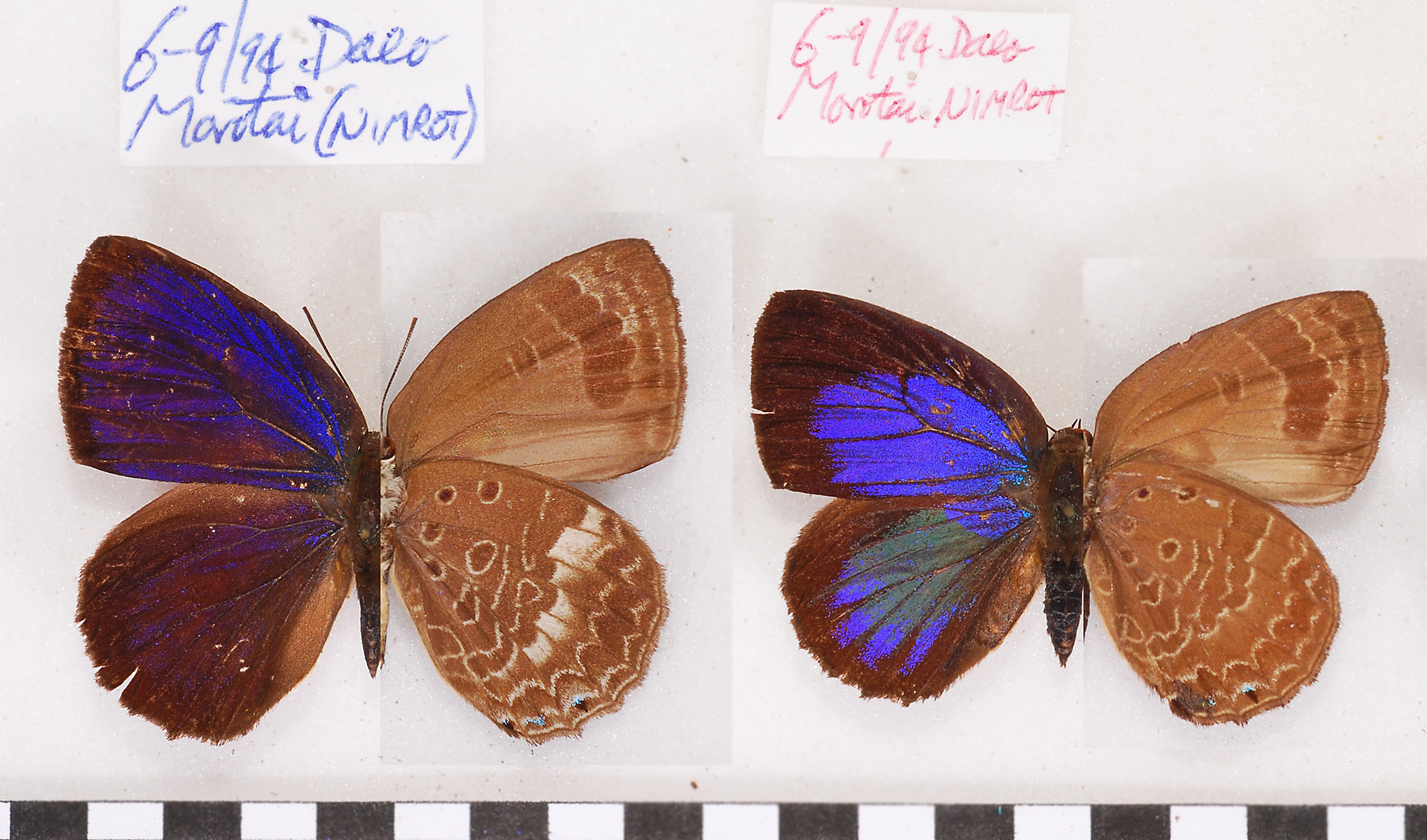
- From the Courvoisier Collection, Basel, Switzerland

Scientific classification
- Kingdom: Animalia
- Phylum: Arthropoda
- Clade: Pancrustacea
- Class: Insecta
- Order: Lepidoptera
- Family: Lycaenidae
- Genus: Arhopala
- Species: A. admete

Binomial name
- Arhopala admete (Hewitson, 1863)

Synonyms
- Amblypodia admete Hewitson, [1863]

= Arhopala admete =

Species of butterfly

Arhopala admete is a butterfly in the family Lycaenidae. It was described by William Chapman Hewitson in 1863. It is found in the Australasian realm.

== Description ==
Beneath all the bands and spots are edged with a bright white on a red-brown ground. Recognizable by all the spots in the forewing being absent as far as the postmedian transverse band, except the cell-end spot; in the hindwing all the spots are very small. Above the male is deep dark blue, the female black, the basal halves of the wings with a blue gloss.

== Subspecies ==
- A. a. admete Serang, Obi, Bachan, Halmahera
- A. a. eucolpis (Kirsch, 1877) Waigeu, Misool, Jobi, West Irian - Papua, Goodenough, Yela, Tagula
- A. a. sudesta (Evans, 1957)Tagula, Yela
