= Theodor Franz Wilhelm Kirsch =

German entomologist

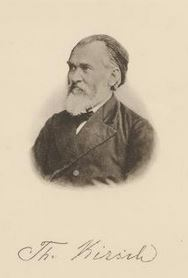
Theodor Franz Wilhelm Kirsch

Theodor Franz Wilhelm Kirsch (29 September 1818, Düben, Torgau - 8 July 1889, Dresden) was a German entomologist who specialised in Coleoptera.

Kirsch was curator of entomology at the Staatliches Museum für Tierkunde Dresden in Dresden.

His collection is shared between Upper Silesian Museum (Muzeum Górnośląskie w Bytomiu) in Bytom and Staatliches Museum für Tierkunde Dresden in Dresden. He described the birdwing butterfly Troides riedeli.

== Works ==
Partial list

- 1865 "Beiträge zur Käferfauna von Bogotá". Berliner Entomologische Zeitschrift. 9: 40-104.
- 1875 "Neue Käfer aus Malacca". Mitteilungen aus dem Koeniglichen Zoologischen Museum zu Dresden. 1: 3-34.
- 1876 "Beitrag zur Kenntnis der Coleopteren-fauna von Neu Guinea". Mitteilungen aus dem Koeniglichen Zoologischen Museum zu Dresden. 2: 137-161.
- 1876 "Beiträge zur Kenntniss der Lepidopteren-Fauna von Neu-Guinea"
- 1876 "Beiträge zur Kenntnis der peruanischen Käferfauna auf Dr. Abendroth's Sammlungen basirt". Deutsche Entomologische Zeitschrift. 20: 81-133.
- 1883 "Neue südamerikanische Käfer". Berliner Entomologische Zeitschrift. 27: 187-213.
