= Astaena ferruginea =

Scientific classification
- Kingdom: Animalia
- Phylum: Arthropoda
- Clade: Pancrustacea
- Class: Insecta
- Order: Coleoptera
- Suborder: Polyphaga
- Infraorder: Scarabaeiformia
- Family: Scarabaeidae
- Genus: Astaena
- Species: A. ferruginea

Binomial name
- Astaena ferruginea Moser, 1918

Species of beetle

Astaena ferruginea is a species of beetle of the family Scarabaeidae. It is found in Colombia.

== Description ==
Adults reach a length of about 8 mm. Adults are similar to Astaena lurida, but smaller, the elytra are without erect hairs and the pronotum has a different shape. They are yellowish-brown and shiny, while the head and pronotum are reddish. The head is quite densely punctate and the surface is rather densely and strongly punctate.
