= Astaena paracorrugata =

Scientific classification
- Kingdom: Animalia
- Phylum: Arthropoda
- Class: Insecta
- Order: Coleoptera
- Suborder: Polyphaga
- Infraorder: Scarabaeiformia
- Family: Scarabaeidae
- Genus: Astaena
- Species: A. paracorrugata

Binomial name
- Astaena paracorrugata Lago, 2021

Species of beetle

Astaena paracorrugata is a species of beetle of the family Scarabaeidae. It is found in Panama.

== Description ==
Adults reach a length of about 8 mm. The head is shiny and piceous, while the pronotum is opaque, velvety and dark grey. The elytra are opaque, velvety and orange-brown anteriorly, but dark grey posteriorly. The abdomen and legs are shiny, with the legs lighter reddish brown.

== Etymology ==
The species name refers to its similarity to Astaena corrugata.
