= Astaena pseudociliata =

Scientific classification
- Kingdom: Animalia
- Phylum: Arthropoda
- Class: Insecta
- Order: Coleoptera
- Suborder: Polyphaga
- Infraorder: Scarabaeiformia
- Family: Scarabaeidae
- Genus: Astaena
- Species: A. pseudociliata

Binomial name
- Astaena pseudociliata Lago, 2021

Species of beetle

Astaena pseudociliata is a species of beetle of the family Scarabaeidae. It is found in Costa Rica.

== Description ==
Adults reach a length of about 7.25 mm. They are dark reddish brown, weakly shiny and opalescent, with sericeous reflections. The head is moderately shiny, while the legs and most of the abdomen are shiny. All surfaces are densely microreticulate.

== Etymology ==
The species name refers to its similarity to Astaena ciliata.
