= Astaena kuntzeni =

Scientific classification
- Kingdom: Animalia
- Phylum: Arthropoda
- Clade: Pancrustacea
- Class: Insecta
- Order: Coleoptera
- Suborder: Polyphaga
- Infraorder: Scarabaeiformia
- Family: Scarabaeidae
- Genus: Astaena
- Species: A. kuntzeni

Binomial name
- Astaena kuntzeni Moser, 1921

Species of beetle

Astaena kuntzeni is a species of beetle of the family Scarabaeidae. It is found in Bolivia.

== Description ==
Adults reach a length of about 7–8 mm. They are very similar to Astaena cuyabana and can only be reliably distinguished by studying the parameres.
