= Astaena vicina =

Scientific classification
- Kingdom: Animalia
- Phylum: Arthropoda
- Class: Insecta
- Order: Coleoptera
- Suborder: Polyphaga
- Infraorder: Scarabaeiformia
- Family: Scarabaeidae
- Genus: Astaena
- Species: A. vicina

Binomial name
- Astaena vicina Frey, 1973

Species of beetle

Astaena vicina is a species of beetle of the family Scarabaeidae. It is found in Ecuador.

== Description ==
Adults reach a length of about 9–10 mm. The pronotum is not hairy and the upper surface is shiny. The coloration is similar to Astaena excisicollis, but the pronotum and head are not quite as dark. The elytra are rather coarsely punctate in rows. The underside is entirely shiny.
