= Astaena testacea =

Scientific classification
- Kingdom: Animalia
- Phylum: Arthropoda
- Class: Insecta
- Order: Coleoptera
- Suborder: Polyphaga
- Infraorder: Scarabaeiformia
- Family: Scarabaeidae
- Genus: Astaena
- Species: A. testacea

Binomial name
- Astaena testacea Lago, 2021

Species of beetle

Astaena testacea is a species of beetle of the family Scarabaeidae. It is found in Costa Rica.

== Description ==
Adults reach a length of about 8–10 mm. They are testaceous brown, with the head and legs shiny. The pronotum, elytra and abdomen are dull and the dorsum is weakly opalescent. The pronotum and elytra are pruinose.

== Etymology ==
The species name refers to the testaceous colour of the holotype.
