= Astaena longula =

Scientific classification
- Kingdom: Animalia
- Phylum: Arthropoda
- Clade: Pancrustacea
- Class: Insecta
- Order: Coleoptera
- Suborder: Polyphaga
- Infraorder: Scarabaeiformia
- Family: Scarabaeidae
- Genus: Astaena
- Species: A. longula

Binomial name
- Astaena longula Moser, 1921

Species of beetle

Astaena longula is a species of beetle of the family Scarabaeidae. It is found in Bolivia.

== Description ==
Adults reach a length of about 12 mm. The head and pronotum are shiny, while the elytra are dull. The pronotum has scattered punctures, while the elytra is not punctate. except for some fine rows of punctures. The antennae are yellow.
