= Astaena howdeni =

Scientific classification
- Kingdom: Animalia
- Phylum: Arthropoda
- Class: Insecta
- Order: Coleoptera
- Suborder: Polyphaga
- Infraorder: Scarabaeiformia
- Family: Scarabaeidae
- Genus: Astaena
- Species: A. howdeni

Binomial name
- Astaena howdeni Lago, 2021

Species of beetle

Astaena howdeni is a species of beetle of the family Scarabaeidae. It is found in Panama.

== Description ==
Adults reach a length of about 7–9 mm. They are dark reddish brown, with the frons and vertex piceous. The head, legs and abdomen are shiny, while the pronotum, elytra, venter of the thorax and pygidium are dull. The pronotum and elytra are weakly sericeous.

== Etymology ==
The species is named after Dr. Henry Howden, who collected part of the type series.
