= Astaena micans =

Scientific classification
- Kingdom: Animalia
- Phylum: Arthropoda
- Class: Insecta
- Order: Coleoptera
- Suborder: Polyphaga
- Infraorder: Scarabaeiformia
- Family: Scarabaeidae
- Genus: Astaena
- Species: A. micans

Binomial name
- Astaena micans Frey, 1973

Species of beetle

Astaena micans is a species of beetle of the family Scarabaeidae. It is found in Brazil (Mato Grosso do Sul, São Paulo).

== Description ==
Adults reach a length of about 10–12 mm. The upper and lower surfaces are reddish-brown and moderately shiny. The head is very densely and evenly medium-coarsely punctate, the punctation becoming somewhat looser posteriorly. The pronotum is densely and uniformly punctate. The elytra are somewhat more coarsely and sparsely punctate than the pronotum (without discernible striations). The underside is as shiny as the upper side. The antennae are brown.
