= Astaena zischkai =

Scientific classification
- Kingdom: Animalia
- Phylum: Arthropoda
- Class: Insecta
- Order: Coleoptera
- Suborder: Polyphaga
- Infraorder: Scarabaeiformia
- Family: Scarabaeidae
- Genus: Astaena
- Species: A. zischkai

Binomial name
- Astaena zischkai Frey, 1973

Species of beetle

Astaena zischkai is a species of beetle of the family Scarabaeidae. It is found in Bolivia.

== Description ==
Adults reach a length of about 10 mm. The upper surface is reddish-brown, dull and tomentose, while the head, pygidium and underside are weakly glossy.
