= Astaena montivaga =

Scientific classification
- Kingdom: Animalia
- Phylum: Arthropoda
- Class: Insecta
- Order: Coleoptera
- Suborder: Polyphaga
- Infraorder: Scarabaeiformia
- Family: Scarabaeidae
- Genus: Astaena
- Species: A. montivaga

Binomial name
- Astaena montivaga Frey, 1973

Species of beetle

Astaena montivaga is a species of beetle of the family Scarabaeidae. It is found in Bolivia.

== Description ==
Adults reach a length of about 11 mm. The upper surface is dark reddish-brown and shiny, while the underside, antennae, legs and pygidium, as well as the clypeus, are light brown.
