= Astaena santaecrucis =

Scientific classification
- Kingdom: Animalia
- Phylum: Arthropoda
- Class: Insecta
- Order: Coleoptera
- Suborder: Polyphaga
- Infraorder: Scarabaeiformia
- Family: Scarabaeidae
- Genus: Astaena
- Species: A. santaecrucis

Binomial name
- Astaena santaecrucis Frey, 1973

Species of beetle

Astaena santaecrucis is a species of beetle of the family Scarabaeidae. It is found in Bolivia.

== Description ==
Adults reach a length of about 7 mm. The upper and under surfaces are faintly glossy, with very scattered, yellowish setae on the elytra. The antennae are yellowish-brown.
