= Astaena schereri =

Scientific classification
- Kingdom: Animalia
- Phylum: Arthropoda
- Class: Insecta
- Order: Coleoptera
- Suborder: Polyphaga
- Infraorder: Scarabaeiformia
- Family: Scarabaeidae
- Genus: Astaena
- Species: A. schereri

Binomial name
- Astaena schereri Frey, 1973

Species of beetle

Astaena schereri is a species of beetle of the family Scarabaeidae. It is found in Bolivia.

== Description ==
Adults reach a length of about 6.5–7.5 mm. The upper and lower surface of the males is brown, somewhat reddish and dull. The legs and head are slightly glossy. The upper surface of the females is faintly silky-glossy and the under surface is dull.
