= Astaena nigrocephala =

Scientific classification
- Kingdom: Animalia
- Phylum: Arthropoda
- Class: Insecta
- Order: Coleoptera
- Suborder: Polyphaga
- Infraorder: Scarabaeiformia
- Family: Scarabaeidae
- Genus: Astaena
- Species: A. nigrocephala

Binomial name
- Astaena nigrocephala Lago, 2021

Species of beetle

Astaena nigrocephala is a species of beetle of the family Scarabaeidae. It is found in Panama.

== Description ==
Adults reach a length of about 6 mm. The head, scutellum, anterior and sutural margins of the elytra are black, while the pronotum and elytra are dark orange. The venter is dark reddish brown to piceous.

== Etymology ==
The species name is derived from Latin niger (meaning black) and Greek kephalē (meaning head) and refers to the uniformly black head.
