= Astaena glabroclypealis =

Scientific classification
- Kingdom: Animalia
- Phylum: Arthropoda
- Class: Insecta
- Order: Coleoptera
- Suborder: Polyphaga
- Infraorder: Scarabaeiformia
- Family: Scarabaeidae
- Genus: Astaena
- Species: A. glabroclypealis

Binomial name
- Astaena glabroclypealis Frey, 1974

Species of beetle

Astaena glabroclypealis is a species of beetle of the family Scarabaeidae. It is found in Argentina and Peru.

== Description ==
Adults reach a length of about 9.5–11 mm. The upper and lower surfaces are shiny reddish-brown (with the pronotum and head reddish-yellow in males). The pronotum of the males is somewhat tomentose and sparsely medium-fine, and the pronotum of the females is considerably coarser and more densely punctate at the sides than on the disc. The elytra have rather coarse striae of punctures. The antennae are brown.
