= Astaena pusilla =

Scientific classification
- Kingdom: Animalia
- Phylum: Arthropoda
- Class: Insecta
- Order: Coleoptera
- Suborder: Polyphaga
- Infraorder: Scarabaeiformia
- Family: Scarabaeidae
- Genus: Astaena
- Species: A. pusilla

Binomial name
- Astaena pusilla Frey, 1973

Species of beetle

Astaena pusilla is a species of beetle of the family Scarabaeidae. It is found in Panama.

== Description ==
Adults reach a length of about 6–9 mm. They are light reddish brown to reddish brown and shiny dorsally and ventrally.

== Etymology ==
The species name is probably derived from Latin pusilla (meaning small), referring to the body size of the species.
