= Astaena pruinosa =

Scientific classification
- Kingdom: Animalia
- Phylum: Arthropoda
- Clade: Pancrustacea
- Class: Insecta
- Order: Coleoptera
- Suborder: Polyphaga
- Infraorder: Scarabaeiformia
- Family: Scarabaeidae
- Genus: Astaena
- Species: A. pruinosa

Binomial name
- Astaena pruinosa Moser, 1918

Species of beetle

Astaena pruinosa is a species of beetle of the family Scarabaeidae. It is found in Venezuela.

== Description ==
Adults reach a length of about 10–11 mm. They have an elongate body. The elytral intervals are scarcely punctate and opalescent.
