= Astaena guanabarae =

Scientific classification
- Kingdom: Animalia
- Phylum: Arthropoda
- Class: Insecta
- Order: Coleoptera
- Suborder: Polyphaga
- Infraorder: Scarabaeiformia
- Family: Scarabaeidae
- Genus: Astaena
- Species: A. guanabarae

Binomial name
- Astaena guanabarae Frey, 1973

Species of beetle

Astaena guanabarae is a species of beetle of the family Scarabaeidae. It is found in Brazil (Rio de Janeiro).

== Description ==
Adults reach a length of about 12 mm. The upper surface is dark reddish-brown and moderately shiny. The pronotum is moderately finely, moderately densely and somewhat irregularly punctate. The elytra have striae of punctures. The antennae are yellow.
