= Astaena diversisetosa =

Scientific classification
- Kingdom: Animalia
- Phylum: Arthropoda
- Class: Insecta
- Order: Coleoptera
- Suborder: Polyphaga
- Infraorder: Scarabaeiformia
- Family: Scarabaeidae
- Genus: Astaena
- Species: A. diversisetosa

Binomial name
- Astaena diversisetosa Lago, 2021

Species of beetle

Astaena diversisetosa is a species of beetle of the family Scarabaeidae. It is found in Costa Rica.

== Description ==
Adults reach a length of about 8.5–11 mm. They are reddish brown, with the top of the head and elytra darker. The dorsum, most of the pygidium and the thoracic venter are opaque, the dorsum faintly opalescent. The legs and abdomen are shiny.

== Etymology ==
The name of the species is derived from Latin diversus (meaning different) and saeta (meaning bristle) and refers to the distinctly different surface setation on various areas of the dorsum.
