= Astaena longicornis =

Scientific classification
- Kingdom: Animalia
- Phylum: Arthropoda
- Class: Insecta
- Order: Coleoptera
- Suborder: Polyphaga
- Infraorder: Scarabaeiformia
- Family: Scarabaeidae
- Genus: Astaena
- Species: A. longicornis

Binomial name
- Astaena longicornis Frey, 1975

Species of beetle

Astaena longicornis is a species of beetle of the family Scarabaeidae. It is found in Venezuela.

== Description ==
Adults reach a length of about 8 mm. They are light reddish-brown. The head and pronotum are shiny, while the elytra are dull. The pronotum and elytra are sparsely ciliate, and there are a few hairs at the apex of the elytra, otherwise the upper surface is glabrous. The pronotum is sparsely and irregularly punctate with fine punctures and the elytra have fine striations of punctures.
