= Astaena brasiliensis =

Scientific classification
- Kingdom: Animalia
- Phylum: Arthropoda
- Class: Insecta
- Order: Coleoptera
- Suborder: Polyphaga
- Infraorder: Scarabaeiformia
- Family: Scarabaeidae
- Genus: Astaena
- Species: A. brasiliensis

Binomial name
- Astaena brasiliensis (Blanchard, 1850)

Synonyms
- Serica brasiliensis Blanchard, 1850

Species of beetle

Astaena brasiliensis is a species of beetle of the family Scarabaeidae. It is found in Brazil.

== Description ==
Adults reach a length of about 10 mm. The pronotum is extremely finely and sparsely punctate.
