= Astaena tenellula =

Scientific classification
- Kingdom: Animalia
- Phylum: Arthropoda
- Clade: Pancrustacea
- Class: Insecta
- Order: Coleoptera
- Suborder: Polyphaga
- Infraorder: Scarabaeiformia
- Family: Scarabaeidae
- Genus: Astaena
- Species: A. tenellula

Binomial name
- Astaena tenellula Moser, 1918

Species of beetle

Astaena tenellula is a species of beetle of the family Scarabaeidae. It is found in Brazil and Paraguay.

== Description ==
Adults reach a length of about 8–10 mm. The pronotum is densely and moderately punctate and the elytra have densely punctate striae, with the intervals sparsely punctate. Both the upper and lower surfaces are reddish-brown.
