= Astaena convexipyga =

Scientific classification
- Kingdom: Animalia
- Phylum: Arthropoda
- Class: Insecta
- Order: Coleoptera
- Suborder: Polyphaga
- Infraorder: Scarabaeiformia
- Family: Scarabaeidae
- Genus: Astaena
- Species: A. convexipyga

Binomial name
- Astaena convexipyga Lago, 2021

Species of beetle

Astaena convexipyga is a species of beetle of the family Scarabaeidae. It is found in Costa Rica and Panama.

== Description ==
Adults reach a length of about 9–12.5 mm. They are bright reddish brown, with the dorsum, pygidium, legs and abdomen smooth and shiny. The elytral epipleura and most of the thoracic venter are pruinose, except for a broad triangular shiny area on the middle of the metathorax.

== Etymology ==
The name of the species is derived from Latin convexus (meaning convex) and pyga (meaning rump or buttocks) and refers to the relatively inflated, evenly convex pygidium.
