= Astaena andicola =

Scientific classification
- Kingdom: Animalia
- Phylum: Arthropoda
- Class: Insecta
- Order: Coleoptera
- Suborder: Polyphaga
- Infraorder: Scarabaeiformia
- Family: Scarabaeidae
- Genus: Astaena
- Species: A. andicola

Binomial name
- Astaena andicola Frey, 1973

Species of beetle

Astaena andicola is a species of beetle of the family Scarabaeidae. It is found in Peru.

== Description ==
Adults reach a length of about 8–10 mm. They are very similar to Astaena moseri and Astaena peruensis. The upper surface is moderately dense and very finely and sparsely punctate. The elytra are finely punctate in striae. The antennae are yellow.
