= Astaena aliena =

Scientific classification
- Kingdom: Animalia
- Phylum: Arthropoda
- Class: Insecta
- Order: Coleoptera
- Suborder: Polyphaga
- Infraorder: Scarabaeiformia
- Family: Scarabaeidae
- Genus: Astaena
- Species: A. aliena

Binomial name
- Astaena aliena Lago, 2021

Species of beetle

Astaena aliena is a species of beetle of the family Scarabaeidae. It is found in Mexico (Veracruz).

== Description ==
Adults reach a length of about 9–11 mm. They are reddish brown. The pronotum and elytra are dull, the latter with faint opalescent reflections. The head is moderately shiny and darker than remainder of the dorsum.

== Etymology ==
The name of the species reflects the fact that the author believes it to be alien to Mexico.
