= Astaena neglecta =

Scientific classification
- Kingdom: Animalia
- Phylum: Arthropoda
- Class: Insecta
- Order: Coleoptera
- Suborder: Polyphaga
- Infraorder: Scarabaeiformia
- Family: Scarabaeidae
- Genus: Astaena
- Species: A. neglecta

Binomial name
- Astaena neglecta Frey, 1976

Species of beetle

Astaena neglecta is a species of beetle of the family Scarabaeidae. It is found in Brazil (Bahia).

== Description ==
Adults reach a length of about 9 mm. They have an elongate-oval body. The upper and lower surfaces are reddish-brown and shiny. The elytra and pronotum are light brown and sparsely ciliate, with a few setae at the pygidium tip. The upper surface is otherwise glabrous.
