= Astaena columbiana =

Scientific classification
- Kingdom: Animalia
- Phylum: Arthropoda
- Class: Insecta
- Order: Coleoptera
- Suborder: Polyphaga
- Infraorder: Scarabaeiformia
- Family: Scarabaeidae
- Genus: Astaena
- Species: A. columbiana

Binomial name
- Astaena columbiana (Blanchard, 1850)

Synonyms
- Serica columbiana Blanchard, 1850; Astaena norrisii Burmeister, 1855

Species of beetle

Astaena columbiana is a species of beetle of the family Scarabaeidae. It is found in Colombia.

== Description ==
The upper surface is reddish-brown. The pronotum is densely and finely punctate.
