= Astaena plaumanni =

Scientific classification
- Kingdom: Animalia
- Phylum: Arthropoda
- Class: Insecta
- Order: Coleoptera
- Suborder: Polyphaga
- Infraorder: Scarabaeiformia
- Family: Scarabaeidae
- Genus: Astaena
- Species: A. plaumanni

Binomial name
- Astaena plaumanni Frey, 1973

Species of beetle

Astaena plaumanni is a species of beetle of the family Scarabaeidae. It is found in Brazil (Santa Catarina).

== Description ==
Adults reach a length of about 10 mm.
