= Astaena crinicollis =

Scientific classification
- Kingdom: Animalia
- Phylum: Arthropoda
- Class: Insecta
- Order: Coleoptera
- Suborder: Polyphaga
- Infraorder: Scarabaeiformia
- Family: Scarabaeidae
- Genus: Astaena
- Species: A. crinicollis

Binomial name
- Astaena crinicollis Frey, 1973

Species of beetle

Astaena crinicollis is a species of beetle of the family Scarabaeidae. It is found in Colombia.

== Description ==
Adults reach a length of about 9–10 mm. The pronotum is hairy, and the upper surface is shiny blackish-brown, both the pronotum and elytra with a dull tomentose margin laterally. The pronotum is moderately finely, sparsely punctate, with a few erect, longer hairs. The elytra have fine punctate striae. The antennae are brown.
