= Astaena setosa =

Scientific classification
- Kingdom: Animalia
- Phylum: Arthropoda
- Class: Insecta
- Order: Coleoptera
- Suborder: Polyphaga
- Infraorder: Scarabaeiformia
- Family: Scarabaeidae
- Genus: Astaena
- Species: A. setosa

Binomial name
- Astaena setosa Frey, 1973

Species of beetle

Astaena setosa is a species of beetle of the family Scarabaeidae. It is found in Peru.

== Description ==
Adults reach a length of about 12 mm. The anterior angles of the pronotum are pointed and projecting, and the pronotum and elytra are coarsely punctate. Furthermore, the pronotum is very densely and the elytra somewhat less densely coarsely punctate. The under surface is sparsely covered with light brown hairs.
