= Astaena obscurata =

Scientific classification
- Kingdom: Animalia
- Phylum: Arthropoda
- Clade: Pancrustacea
- Class: Insecta
- Order: Coleoptera
- Suborder: Polyphaga
- Infraorder: Scarabaeiformia
- Family: Scarabaeidae
- Genus: Astaena
- Species: A. obscurata

Binomial name
- Astaena obscurata Moser, 1918

Species of beetle

Astaena obscurata is a species of beetle of the family Scarabaeidae. It is found in Colombia.

== Description ==
Adults reach a length of about 10–12 mm. The head is shiny, while the pronotum and elytra are dull. They are blackish-brown, the pronotum with a reddish spot on the sides.
