= Astaena producta =

Scientific classification
- Kingdom: Animalia
- Phylum: Arthropoda
- Class: Insecta
- Order: Coleoptera
- Suborder: Polyphaga
- Infraorder: Scarabaeiformia
- Family: Scarabaeidae
- Genus: Astaena
- Species: A. producta

Binomial name
- Astaena producta Bates, 1892

Species of beetle

Astaena producta is a species of beetle of the family Scarabaeidae. It is found in Ecuador.

== Description ==
Adults reach a length of about 12 mm. They have a chestnut-red, elongate-oblong body. The surface is shiny and glabrous.
