= Astaena castanea =

Scientific classification
- Kingdom: Animalia
- Phylum: Arthropoda
- Clade: Pancrustacea
- Class: Insecta
- Order: Coleoptera
- Suborder: Polyphaga
- Infraorder: Scarabaeiformia
- Family: Scarabaeidae
- Genus: Astaena
- Species: A. castanea

Binomial name
- Astaena castanea Moser, 1918

Species of beetle

Astaena castanea is a species of beetle of the family Scarabaeidae. It is found in Colombia.

== Description ==
Adults reach a length of about 8 mm. They are yellowish-brown and shiny. The head is sparsely punctate, while the surface is moderately densely punctate.
