= Astaena obscurifrons =

Scientific classification
- Kingdom: Animalia
- Phylum: Arthropoda
- Clade: Pancrustacea
- Class: Insecta
- Order: Coleoptera
- Suborder: Polyphaga
- Infraorder: Scarabaeiformia
- Family: Scarabaeidae
- Genus: Astaena
- Species: A. obscurifrons

Binomial name
- Astaena obscurifrons Moser, 1921

Species of beetle

Astaena obscurifrons is a species of beetle of the family Scarabaeidae. It is found in Bolivia.

== Description ==
Adults reach a length of about 9 mm. The upper surface is dark reddish-brown and highly shiny, while the frons is black and extremely sparsely punctate.
