= Astaena sulcatipennis =

Scientific classification
- Kingdom: Animalia
- Phylum: Arthropoda
- Class: Insecta
- Order: Coleoptera
- Suborder: Polyphaga
- Infraorder: Scarabaeiformia
- Family: Scarabaeidae
- Genus: Astaena
- Species: A. sulcatipennis

Binomial name
- Astaena sulcatipennis (Blanchard, 1850)

Synonyms
- Temnostoma sulcatipennis Blanchard, 1850; Astaena fuscipennis Burmeister, 1855

Species of beetle

Astaena sulcatipennis is a species of beetle of the family Scarabaeidae. It is found in Brazil (Rio de Janeiro).

== Description ==
Adults reach a length of about 8–10 mm. The pronotum has strongly ridged projections and the elytra are grooved. They are moderately shiny.
