= Astaena tumidiceps =

Scientific classification
- Kingdom: Animalia
- Phylum: Arthropoda
- Class: Insecta
- Order: Coleoptera
- Suborder: Polyphaga
- Infraorder: Scarabaeiformia
- Family: Scarabaeidae
- Genus: Astaena
- Species: A. tumidiceps

Binomial name
- Astaena tumidiceps Frey, 1974

Species of beetle

Astaena tumidiceps is a species of beetle of the family Scarabaeidae. It is found in Brazil (Bahia).

== Description ==
Adults reach a length of about 10 mm. The pronotum, scutellum, elytra, pygidium, and underside are all reddish-brown, dull and somewhat silky-glossy. The head is blackish-brown and normally shiny. The margins of the pronotum and elytra have long light brown cilia. The antennae are light brown. The pronotum is very finely and evenly sparsely punctate and the elytra have striae with extremely fine and scattered punctures.
