= Astaena truncaticeps =

Scientific classification
- Kingdom: Animalia
- Phylum: Arthropoda
- Clade: Pancrustacea
- Class: Insecta
- Order: Coleoptera
- Suborder: Polyphaga
- Infraorder: Scarabaeiformia
- Family: Scarabaeidae
- Genus: Astaena
- Species: A. truncaticeps

Binomial name
- Astaena truncaticeps Moser, 1924

Species of beetle

Astaena truncaticeps is a species of beetle of the family Scarabaeidae. It is found in Brazil (Espírito Santo, Minas Gerais).

== Description ==
Adults reach a length of about 9 mm. The pronotum is densely and finely punctate with some erect hairs. Adults are nearly identical to Astaena argentina and can only be definitively separated by their parameters.
