= Astaena boliviana =

Scientific classification
- Kingdom: Animalia
- Phylum: Arthropoda
- Class: Insecta
- Order: Coleoptera
- Suborder: Polyphaga
- Infraorder: Scarabaeiformia
- Family: Scarabaeidae
- Genus: Astaena
- Species: A. boliviana

Binomial name
- Astaena boliviana Frey, 1974

Species of beetle

Astaena boliviana is a species of beetle of the family Scarabaeidae. It is found in Bolivia.

== Description ==
Adults reach a length of about 8 mm. The upper and lower surfaces are light reddish-yellow and moderately glossy. The head is densely and finely punctate. The pronotum is unevenly and as finely punctate as the head and the elytra have fine striae of punctures.
