= Astaena stockwelli =

Scientific classification
- Kingdom: Animalia
- Phylum: Arthropoda
- Class: Insecta
- Order: Coleoptera
- Suborder: Polyphaga
- Infraorder: Scarabaeiformia
- Family: Scarabaeidae
- Genus: Astaena
- Species: A. stockwelli

Binomial name
- Astaena stockwelli Lago, 2021

Species of beetle

Astaena stockwelli is a species of beetle of the family Scarabaeidae. It is found in Costa Rica and Panama.

== Description ==
Adults reach a length of about 8 mm. They are reddish testaceous, with the head a little darker. The pronotum and elytra are opaque and lightly pruinose. The dorsum is weakly opalescent and the head, legs, and most of the abdomen are shiny.

== Etymology ==
The species is named after Henry P. Stockwell, who collected the original specimen.
