= Astaena semiopaca =

Scientific classification
- Kingdom: Animalia
- Phylum: Arthropoda
- Class: Insecta
- Order: Coleoptera
- Suborder: Polyphaga
- Infraorder: Scarabaeiformia
- Family: Scarabaeidae
- Genus: Astaena
- Species: A. semiopaca

Binomial name
- Astaena semiopaca Frey, 1973

Species of beetle

Astaena semiopaca is a species of beetle of the family Scarabaeidae. It is found in Ecuador.

== Description ==
Adults reach a length of about 10 mm. The upper surface is dark reddish-brown, while the antennae, legs and underside are light brown. The head, pronotum and pygidium are shiny, while the elytra and scutellum are dull.
