= Astaena boliviensis =

Scientific classification
- Kingdom: Animalia
- Phylum: Arthropoda
- Clade: Pancrustacea
- Class: Insecta
- Order: Coleoptera
- Suborder: Polyphaga
- Infraorder: Scarabaeiformia
- Family: Scarabaeidae
- Genus: Astaena
- Species: A. boliviensis

Binomial name
- Astaena boliviensis Moser, 1918

Species of beetle

Astaena boliviensis is a species of beetle of the family Scarabaeidae. It is found in Bolivia.

== Description ==
Adults reach a length of about 10 mm. The clypeus upper surface is smooth, only partially with a few scattered dark brown tomentose punctures. The pronotum is mostly light reddish-brown. The anterior angles of the pronotum are pointed.
