= Astaena moroni =

Scientific classification
- Kingdom: Animalia
- Phylum: Arthropoda
- Class: Insecta
- Order: Coleoptera
- Suborder: Polyphaga
- Infraorder: Scarabaeiformia
- Family: Scarabaeidae
- Genus: Astaena
- Species: A. moroni

Binomial name
- Astaena moroni Lago, 2021

Species of beetle

Astaena moroni is a species of beetle of the family Scarabaeidae. It is found in Costa Rica.

== Description ==
Adults reach a length of about 9.5-10.5 mm. They are reddish brown, with the dorsum, legs and abdomen smooth and shiny. The lateral and basal margins of the pronotum, ninth elytral intervals, elytral epipleura, first two visible abdominal sternites and most of thoracic venter are pruinose. The shiny surfaces have dense microsculpture.

== Etymology ==
The species is named for Dr. Miguel A. Moron.
