= Astaena pinguis =

Scientific classification
- Kingdom: Animalia
- Phylum: Arthropoda
- Class: Insecta
- Order: Coleoptera
- Suborder: Polyphaga
- Infraorder: Scarabaeiformia
- Family: Scarabaeidae
- Genus: Astaena
- Species: A. pinguis

Binomial name
- Astaena pinguis Burmeister, 1855

Species of beetle

Astaena pinguis is a species of beetle of the family Scarabaeidae. It is found in Brazil (Rio de Janeiro) and Colombia.

== Description ==
Adults reach a length of about 11–13 mm. The pronotum is sparsely and finely punctate.
