= Astaena penai =

Scientific classification
- Kingdom: Animalia
- Phylum: Arthropoda
- Class: Insecta
- Order: Coleoptera
- Suborder: Polyphaga
- Infraorder: Scarabaeiformia
- Family: Scarabaeidae
- Genus: Astaena
- Species: A. penai

Binomial name
- Astaena penai Frey, 1973

Species of beetle

Astaena penai is a species of beetle of the family Scarabaeidae. It is found in Ecuador and Peru.

== Description ==
Adults reach a length of about 10 mm. The upper surface of the males is sparsely, while the upper surface of the females is somewhat more densely punctate. The upper surface is shiny. The pronotum is uniformly moderately fine, sparsely punctate, while the scutellum is without punctures and the pygidium is almost without punctures.
