= Astaena =

Scientific classification
- Kingdom: Animalia
- Phylum: Arthropoda
- Clade: Pancrustacea
- Class: Insecta
- Order: Coleoptera
- Suborder: Polyphaga
- Infraorder: Scarabaeiformia
- Family: Scarabaeidae
- Subfamily: Sericinae
- Tribe: Sericini
- Genus: Astaena; Erichson, 1847

Synonyms
- Temnostoma Blanchard, 1850 (preocc.)

Genus of leaf beetles

Astaena is a genus of beetles belonging to the family Scarabaeidae.

== Species ==
- Astaena abaca Saylor, 1946
- Astaena acuticollis Frey, 1973
- Astaena aequatorialis Kirsch, 1885
- Astaena aliena Lago, 2021
- Astaena alternata Lago, 2021
- Astaena andicola Frey, 1973
- Astaena andina Frey, 1973
- Astaena argentina Moser, 1921
- Astaena bahiana Moser, 1918
- Astaena baroni Moser, 1918
- Astaena biciliata Saylor, 1946
- Astaena bogotana Saylor, 1946
- Astaena boliviana Frey, 1974
- Astaena boliviensis Moser, 1918
- Astaena brasiliana Moser, 1918
- Astaena brasiliensis (Blanchard, 1850)
- Astaena brevisetosa Lago, 2021
- Astaena bruchi Moser, 1924
- Astaena callosipygus Frey, 1973
- Astaena capillata Moser, 1918
- Astaena castanea Moser, 1918
- Astaena catharinensis Frey, 1973
- Astaena ciliata Lago, 2021
- Astaena clypealis Moser, 1921
- Astaena cochabamba Frey, 1973
- Astaena cognata Burmeister, 1855
- Astaena columbiana (Blanchard, 1850)
- Astaena columbiensis Moser, 1918
- Astaena conformis Blanchard, 1850
- Astaena confusa Lago, 2021
- Astaena convexipyga Lago, 2021
- Astaena cordobana Moser, 1921
- Astaena corrugata Lago, 2021
- Astaena corumbana Moser, 1921
- Astaena crassitarsis Frey, 1973
- Astaena crinicollis Frey, 1973
- Astaena cuyabana Moser, 1918
- Astaena depressa Lago, 2021
- Astaena dichromia Lago, 2021
- Astaena divergens Frey, 1973
- Astaena diversipennis Lago, 2021
- Astaena diversisetosa Lago, 2021
- Astaena elongata Burmeister, 1855
- Astaena excisicollis Frey, 1973
- Astaena excisipes Saylor, 1947
- Astaena explaniceps Saylor, 1947
- Astaena exquisita Frey, 1973
- Astaena fassli Moser, 1918
- Astaena ferrugata (Blanchard, 1850)
- Astaena ferruginea Moser, 1918
- Astaena forsteri Frey, 1974
- Astaena fortuna Lago, 2021
- Astaena foveicollis Kirsch, 1885
- Astaena freyi Lago, 2021
- Astaena fusagona Saylor, 1946
- Astaena glabroclypealis Frey, 1974
- Astaena guanabarae Frey, 1973
- Astaena heterophylla Moser, 1921
- Astaena hiekei Frey, 1973
- Astaena hirsuta Frey, 1973
- Astaena hirtella Frey, 1973
- Astaena howdeni Lago, 2021
- Astaena inbio Lago, 2021
- Astaena incachaca Saylor, 1946
- Astaena inflata Lago, 2021
- Astaena insulana Moser, 1918
- Astaena iridescens Frey, 1974
- Astaena kuehnelti Frey, 1973
- Astaena kuntzeni Moser, 1921
- Astaena leechi Frey, 1973
- Astaena lojana Frey, 1973
- Astaena longicornis Frey, 1975
- Astaena longula Moser, 1921
- Astaena lurida Moser, 1918
- Astaena macilenta Bates, 1887
- Astaena maddeni Lago, 2021
- Astaena maqueta Saylor, 1947
- Astaena marginicollis Frey, 1973
- Astaena marginithorax Frey, 1973
- Astaena micans Frey, 1973
- Astaena minuta Lago, 2021
- Astaena montivaga Frey, 1973
- Astaena moroni Lago, 2021
- Astaena moseri Frey, 1973
- Astaena neglecta Frey, 1976
- Astaena negligens Frey, 1973
- Astaena nigrocephala Lago, 2021
- Astaena nigrona Saylor, 1947
- Astaena nitens Frey, 1976
- Astaena nitidula Moser, 1918
- Astaena oblonga Moser, 1918
- Astaena obscurata Moser, 1918
- Astaena obscurifrons Moser, 1921
- Astaena ocellata Lago, 2021
- Astaena ohausi Moser, 1921
- Astaena omega Lago, 2021
- Astaena opaca Frey, 1973
- Astaena opalicauda Bates, 1887
- Astaena opalipennis Frey, 1973
- Astaena paracorrugata Lago, 2021
- Astaena pauloensis Frey, 1973
- Astaena pectoralis Moser, 1918
- Astaena penai Frey, 1973
- Astaena peruana Moser, 1918
- Astaena peruensis Frey, 1973
- Astaena pilicollis Frey, 1973
- Astaena pilosa Moser, 1921
- Astaena pilosella Kirsch, 1885
- Astaena pinguis Burmeister, 1855
- Astaena plaumanni Frey, 1973
- Astaena producta Bates, 1892
- Astaena pruinosa Moser, 1918
- Astaena pseudociliata Lago, 2021
- Astaena pusilla Frey, 1973
- Astaena pygidia Saylor, 1946
- Astaena pygidialis Kirsch, 1885
- Astaena ratcliffei Lago, 2021
- Astaena rockefelleri Frey, 1973
- Astaena rosettae Frey, 1973
- Astaena rotundiceps Frey, 1973
- Astaena rufa Moser, 1921
- Astaena rufescens Frey, 1973
- Astaena ruficollis Moser, 1926
- Astaena rugithorax Saylor, 1946
- Astaena salta Saylor, 1946
- Astaena santaecrucis Frey, 1973
- Astaena saylori Frey, 1973
- Astaena schereri Frey, 1973
- Astaena schneblei Frey, 1973
- Astaena semiopaca Frey, 1973
- Astaena sericea Frey, 1973
- Astaena setosa Frey, 1973
- Astaena sigma Lago, 2021
- Astaena simulatrix Frey, 1974
- Astaena sparsesetosa Frey, 1976
- Astaena splendens Frey, 1973
- Astaena stockwelli Lago, 2021
- Astaena sulcatipennis (Blanchard, 1850)
- Astaena suturalis (Kirsch, 1865)
- Astaena tarsalis Moser, 1918
- Astaena tenella Burmeister, 1855
- Astaena tenellula Moser, 1918
- Astaena testacea Lago, 2021
- Astaena tomentosa Frey, 1973
- Astaena tridentata Erichson, 1847
- Astaena truncaticeps Moser, 1924
- Astaena tucumana Frey, 1974
- Astaena tumidiceps Frey, 1974
- Astaena valida Burmeister, 1855
- Astaena vicina Frey, 1973
- Astaena vilifrons Lago, 2021
- Astaena villosa Lago, 2021
- Astaena yungasa Saylor, 1946
- Astaena zischkai Frey, 1973
- Astaena zyrota Saylor, 1946
