= Astaena suturalis =

Scientific classification
- Kingdom: Animalia
- Phylum: Arthropoda
- Class: Insecta
- Order: Coleoptera
- Suborder: Polyphaga
- Infraorder: Scarabaeiformia
- Family: Scarabaeidae
- Genus: Astaena
- Species: A. suturalis

Binomial name
- Astaena suturalis (Kirsch, 1865)

Synonyms
- Symmela suturalis Kirsch, 1865

Species of beetle

Astaena suturalis is a species of beetle of the family Scarabaeidae. It is found in Colombia.

== Description ==
Adults reach a length of about 7–8 mm. They have an elongate body. The upper surface is light reddish-brown and there is a dark brown, more or less broad sutural stripe on the elytra and the disc of the pronotum.
