= Astaena marginicollis =

Scientific classification
- Kingdom: Animalia
- Phylum: Arthropoda
- Class: Insecta
- Order: Coleoptera
- Suborder: Polyphaga
- Infraorder: Scarabaeiformia
- Family: Scarabaeidae
- Genus: Astaena
- Species: A. marginicollis

Binomial name
- Astaena marginicollis Frey, 1973

Species of beetle

Astaena marginicollis is a species of beetle of the family Scarabaeidae. It is found in Argentina.

== Description ==
Adults reach a length of about 9–10 mm. They are light brown, with only the pronotum and head slightly darker.
