= Astaena opalicauda =

Scientific classification
- Kingdom: Animalia
- Phylum: Arthropoda
- Class: Insecta
- Order: Coleoptera
- Suborder: Polyphaga
- Infraorder: Scarabaeiformia
- Family: Scarabaeidae
- Genus: Astaena
- Species: A. opalicauda

Binomial name
- Astaena opalicauda Bates, 1887

Species of beetle

Astaena opalicauda is a species of beetle of the family Scarabaeidae. It is found in Costa Rica, Honduras, Nicaragua and Panama.

== Description ==
Adults reach a length of about 7–10 mm. They are dark auburn, dull, opalescent and slightly iridescent.

== Etymology ==
The species name possibly refers to the richly opalescent elytra of the species.
