= Astaena pilicollis =

Scientific classification
- Kingdom: Animalia
- Phylum: Arthropoda
- Class: Insecta
- Order: Coleoptera
- Suborder: Polyphaga
- Infraorder: Scarabaeiformia
- Family: Scarabaeidae
- Genus: Astaena
- Species: A. pilicollis

Binomial name
- Astaena pilicollis Frey, 1973

Species of beetle

Astaena pilicollis is a species of beetle of the family Scarabaeidae. It is found in Colombia.

== Description ==
Adults reach a length of about 9 mm. The pronotum is punctate and has erect hairs. The elytra bear partially transverse rows of simple punctures, while the pygidium is sparsely punctured. The entire upper surface is shiny. The underside is also shiny, except for the dull metasternum.
