= Astaena villosa =

Scientific classification
- Kingdom: Animalia
- Phylum: Arthropoda
- Class: Insecta
- Order: Coleoptera
- Suborder: Polyphaga
- Infraorder: Scarabaeiformia
- Family: Scarabaeidae
- Genus: Astaena
- Species: A. villosa

Binomial name
- Astaena villosa Lago, 2021

Species of beetle

Astaena villosa is a species of beetle of the family Scarabaeidae. It is found in Costa Rica.

== Description ==
Adults reach a length of about 8 mm. They are dark reddish brown. The head, legs and abdomen are shiny, while the pronotum and elytra are dull. The dorsum is opalescent.

== Etymology ==
The species name is derived from Latin villosa (meaning shaggy or hairy) and refers to the dorsal setation of this species.
