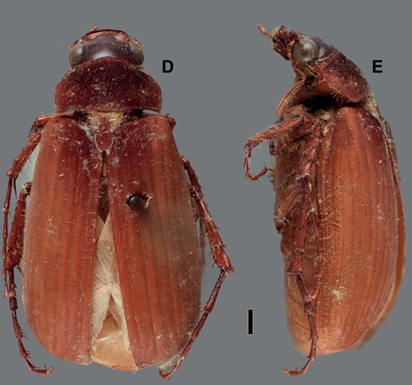

Scientific classification
- Kingdom: Animalia
- Phylum: Arthropoda
- Class: Insecta
- Order: Coleoptera
- Suborder: Polyphaga
- Infraorder: Scarabaeiformia
- Family: Scarabaeidae
- Genus: Astaena
- Species: A. yungasa

Binomial name
- Astaena yungasa Saylor, 1946

= Astaena yungasa =

Species of beetle

Astaena yungasa is a species of beetle of the family Scarabaeidae. It is found in Bolivia.

== Description ==
Adults reach a length of about 14 mm. The head is blackish-brown with upright setae. The surface of the pronotum and elytra also has setae. The pronotum is unicolored blackish-brown, while the elytra are unicolored reddish-brown.
