= Astaena catharinensis =

Scientific classification
- Kingdom: Animalia
- Phylum: Arthropoda
- Class: Insecta
- Order: Coleoptera
- Suborder: Polyphaga
- Infraorder: Scarabaeiformia
- Family: Scarabaeidae
- Genus: Astaena
- Species: A. catharinensis

Binomial name
- Astaena catharinensis Frey, 1973

Species of beetle

Astaena catharinensis is a species of beetle of the family Scarabaeidae. It is found in Brazil (Santa Catarina).

== Description ==
Adults reach a length of about 10 mm. They have an oblong-oval body. The upper and lower surfaces are light reddish-brown and shiny. The pronotum is sparsely, irregularly, moderately and finely punctate and the elytra have fine, punctate striae, while the intervals are not punctate. The margins of the elytra are moderately densely, while those of the pronotum very sparsely, fringed with light brown cilia. The underside is very sparsely hairy and shiny. The antennae are yellow.
