= Astaena freyi =

Scientific classification
- Kingdom: Animalia
- Phylum: Arthropoda
- Class: Insecta
- Order: Coleoptera
- Suborder: Polyphaga
- Infraorder: Scarabaeiformia
- Family: Scarabaeidae
- Genus: Astaena
- Species: A. freyi

Binomial name
- Astaena freyi Lago, 2021

Species of beetle

Astaena freyi is a species of beetle of the family Scarabaeidae. It is found in Panama.

== Description ==
Adults reach a length of about 6.7–7.5 mm. They are dark reddish brown, with the vertex and frons slightly darker and the venter lighter. The legs are yellowish and the head, legs, abdomen, pygidium and center of the metathorax are shiny. The pronotum, elytra, metacoxal plate and lateral portions of the metasternum are pruinose, the pronotum and elytra lightly sericeous.

== Etymology ==
The species is named after Georg Frey.
