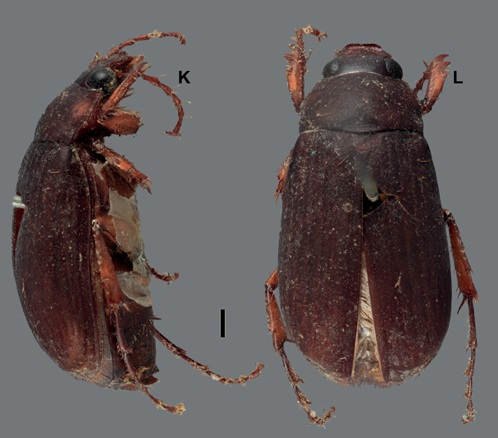

Scientific classification
- Kingdom: Animalia
- Phylum: Arthropoda
- Class: Insecta
- Order: Coleoptera
- Suborder: Polyphaga
- Infraorder: Scarabaeiformia
- Family: Scarabaeidae
- Genus: Astaena
- Species: A. nigrona

Binomial name
- Astaena nigrona Saylor, 1946

Synonyms
- Astaena nigroana

= Astaena nigrona =

Species of beetle

Astaena nigrona is a species of beetle of the family Scarabaeidae. It is found in Colombia.

== Description ==
Adults reach a length of about 12 mm. The head is reddish-brown. The surface of the pronotum and elytra has setae. The pronotum is reddish-brown with two red spots on the laterals. The elytra are unicolored blackish-brown.
