= Astaena cochabamba =

Scientific classification
- Kingdom: Animalia
- Phylum: Arthropoda
- Class: Insecta
- Order: Coleoptera
- Suborder: Polyphaga
- Infraorder: Scarabaeiformia
- Family: Scarabaeidae
- Genus: Astaena
- Species: A. cochabamba

Binomial name
- Astaena cochabamba Frey, 1973

Species of beetle

Astaena cochabamba is a species of beetle of the family Scarabaeidae. It is found in Bolivia and Brazil.

== Description ==
Adults reach a length of about 11–12 mm. The upper surface is dark brown and tomentose, with the pronotum slightly lighter. The pronotum is very finely, moderately densely punctate.
