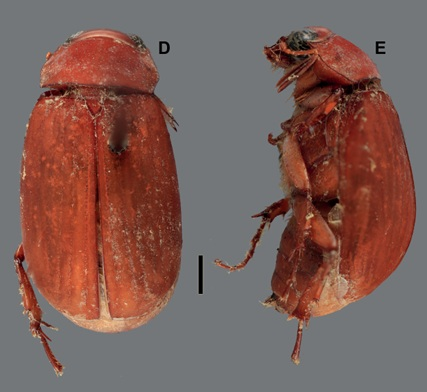

Scientific classification
- Kingdom: Animalia
- Phylum: Arthropoda
- Class: Insecta
- Order: Coleoptera
- Suborder: Polyphaga
- Infraorder: Scarabaeiformia
- Family: Scarabaeidae
- Genus: Astaena
- Species: A. pygidia

Binomial name
- Astaena pygidia Saylor, 1946

= Astaena pygidia =

Species of beetle

Astaena pygidia is a species of beetle of the family Scarabaeidae. It is found in Peru.

== Description ==
Adults reach a length of about 8 mm. The head is reddish-brown. The surface of the pronotum and elytra is without setae and both are unicolored brownish orange.
