= Astaena fassli =

Scientific classification
- Kingdom: Animalia
- Phylum: Arthropoda
- Clade: Pancrustacea
- Class: Insecta
- Order: Coleoptera
- Suborder: Polyphaga
- Infraorder: Scarabaeiformia
- Family: Scarabaeidae
- Genus: Astaena
- Species: A. fassli

Binomial name
- Astaena fassli Moser, 1918

Species of beetle

Astaena fassli is a species of beetle of the family Scarabaeidae. It is found in Colombia.

== Description ==
Adults reach a length of about 10 mm. They are reddish-yellow and dull, but the head, abdomen and legs are glossy. There are rows of punctures on the elytra.
