= Astaena schneblei =

Scientific classification
- Kingdom: Animalia
- Phylum: Arthropoda
- Class: Insecta
- Order: Coleoptera
- Suborder: Polyphaga
- Infraorder: Scarabaeiformia
- Family: Scarabaeidae
- Genus: Astaena
- Species: A. schneblei

Binomial name
- Astaena schneblei Frey, 1973

Species of beetle

Astaena schneblei is a species of beetle of the family Scarabaeidae. It is found in Colombia.

== Description ==
Adults reach a length of about 8 mm. The pronotum is shiny and the elytra are dull. The back of the head sparsely and very finely punctate. The antennae are light brown.
