= Astaena depressa =

Scientific classification
- Kingdom: Animalia
- Phylum: Arthropoda
- Class: Insecta
- Order: Coleoptera
- Suborder: Polyphaga
- Infraorder: Scarabaeiformia
- Family: Scarabaeidae
- Genus: Astaena
- Species: A. depressa

Binomial name
- Astaena depressa Lago, 2021

Species of beetle

Astaena depressa is a species of beetle of the family Scarabaeidae. It is found in Panama.

== Description ==
Adults reach a length of about 7–8 mm. They are reddish brown, with the head, legs and portions of the abdomen shiny. The pronotum, elytra, pygidium and venter of the thorax are opaque and the elytra, pronotum, metasternum and anterior abdomen are lightly pruinose.

== Etymology ==
The name of the species refers to the median depression of the metasternum.
