= Astaena hiekei =

Scientific classification
- Kingdom: Animalia
- Phylum: Arthropoda
- Class: Insecta
- Order: Coleoptera
- Suborder: Polyphaga
- Infraorder: Scarabaeiformia
- Family: Scarabaeidae
- Genus: Astaena
- Species: A. hiekei

Binomial name
- Astaena hiekei Frey, 1973

Species of beetle

Astaena hiekei is a species of beetle of the family Scarabaeidae. It is found in Costa Rica.

== Description ==
Adults reach a length of about 10 mm. They are reddish brown, with the head and legs shiny. The pronotum, elytra and pygidium are pruinose, with slight opalescence. The venter is reddish brown and opaque.

== Etymology ==
The species is named after Dr. Hieke of the Berlin Museum.
