= Astaena lojana =

Scientific classification
- Kingdom: Animalia
- Phylum: Arthropoda
- Class: Insecta
- Order: Coleoptera
- Suborder: Polyphaga
- Infraorder: Scarabaeiformia
- Family: Scarabaeidae
- Genus: Astaena
- Species: A. lojana

Binomial name
- Astaena lojana Frey, 1973

Species of beetle

Astaena lojana is a species of beetle of the family Scarabaeidae. It is found in Ecuador.

== Description ==
Adults reach a length of about 9 mm. The head and elytra are dark brown. The head is shiny. The pronotum is light reddish-brown and not punctate.
