= Astaena tenella =

Scientific classification
- Kingdom: Animalia
- Phylum: Arthropoda
- Class: Insecta
- Order: Coleoptera
- Suborder: Polyphaga
- Infraorder: Scarabaeiformia
- Family: Scarabaeidae
- Genus: Astaena
- Species: A. tenella

Binomial name
- Astaena tenella Burmeister, 1855

Synonyms
- Astaena variolata Burmeister, 1855

Species of beetle

Astaena tenella is a species of beetle of the family Scarabaeidae. It is found in Brazil (Paraná, Rio de Janeiro, São Paulo).

== Description ==
Adults reach a length of about 7–8 mm. The pronotum is shiny and irregularly sparsely punctate. The elytra of the males are dull, while those of the females are shiny.
