= Astaena pygidialis =

Scientific classification
- Kingdom: Animalia
- Phylum: Arthropoda
- Class: Insecta
- Order: Coleoptera
- Suborder: Polyphaga
- Infraorder: Scarabaeiformia
- Family: Scarabaeidae
- Genus: Astaena
- Species: A. pygidialis

Binomial name
- Astaena pygidialis Kirsch, 1885

Species of beetle

Astaena pygidialis is a species of beetle of the family Scarabaeidae. It is found in Colombia.

== Description ==
Adults reach a length of about 7–8 mm. The sides of the pronotum are yellowish-red, but the remainder of the upper surface is dark brown, partly dull and tomentose and partly opalescent.
