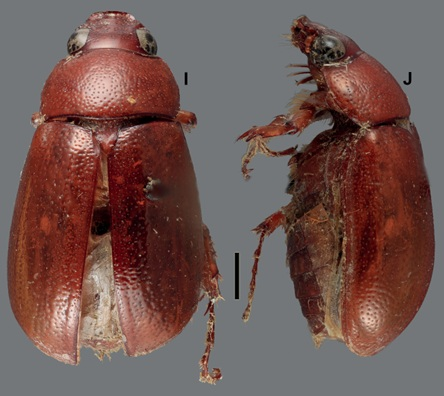

Scientific classification
- Kingdom: Animalia
- Phylum: Arthropoda
- Class: Insecta
- Order: Coleoptera
- Suborder: Polyphaga
- Infraorder: Scarabaeiformia
- Family: Scarabaeidae
- Genus: Astaena
- Species: A. zyrota

Binomial name
- Astaena zyrota Saylor, 1946

= Astaena zyrota =

Species of beetle

Astaena zyrota is a species of beetle of the family Scarabaeidae. It is found in Guyana.

== Description ==
Adults reach a length of about 7.5 mm. The head is reddish-brown without setae. Both the pronotum and elytra are unicolored reddish-brown.
