= Astaena conformis =

Scientific classification
- Kingdom: Animalia
- Phylum: Arthropoda
- Class: Insecta
- Order: Coleoptera
- Suborder: Polyphaga
- Infraorder: Scarabaeiformia
- Family: Scarabaeidae
- Genus: Astaena
- Species: A. conformis

Binomial name
- Astaena conformis Blanchard, 1850

Species of beetle

Astaena conformis is a species of beetle of the family Scarabaeidae. It is found in Paraguay.

== Description ==
Adults reach a length of about 11 mm. The pronotum is densely and finely punctate.
