= Astaena peruana =

Scientific classification
- Kingdom: Animalia
- Phylum: Arthropoda
- Clade: Pancrustacea
- Class: Insecta
- Order: Coleoptera
- Suborder: Polyphaga
- Infraorder: Scarabaeiformia
- Family: Scarabaeidae
- Genus: Astaena
- Species: A. peruana

Binomial name
- Astaena peruana Moser, 1918

Species of beetle

Astaena peruana is a species of beetle of the family Scarabaeidae. It is found in Peru.

== Description ==
Adults reach a length of about 7 mm. They are slightly shiny. The upper surface is blackish-brown, while the under surface is yellowish-brown. The frons is finely punctate. The elytra have rows of punctures. The underside is sparsely and finely punctate.
