= Astaena maddeni =

Scientific classification
- Kingdom: Animalia
- Phylum: Arthropoda
- Class: Insecta
- Order: Coleoptera
- Suborder: Polyphaga
- Infraorder: Scarabaeiformia
- Family: Scarabaeidae
- Genus: Astaena
- Species: A. maddeni

Binomial name
- Astaena maddeni Lago, 2021

Species of beetle

Astaena maddeni is a species of beetle of the family Scarabaeidae. It is found in Panama.

== Description ==
Adults reach a length of about 8.5 mm. They are light reddish brown, with the head, legs and parts of the abdomen shiny. The pronotum, elytra, pygidium, thoracic venter and most of the abdomen are pruinose, the pronotum and elytra with slight opalescence.

== Etymology ==
The species name refers to its type locality, the Madden Dam area.
