= Astaena pilosella =

Scientific classification
- Kingdom: Animalia
- Phylum: Arthropoda
- Class: Insecta
- Order: Coleoptera
- Suborder: Polyphaga
- Infraorder: Scarabaeiformia
- Family: Scarabaeidae
- Genus: Astaena
- Species: A. pilosella

Binomial name
- Astaena pilosella Kirsch, 1885

Species of beetle

Astaena pilosella is a species of beetle of the family Scarabaeidae. It is found in Colombia.

== Description ==
Adults reach a length of about 10 mm. The anterior angles of the pronotum are pointed and projecting. The upper surface is dark brown and densely covered with fine, erect pubescence. The pronotal disc is moderately punctate at the margin, with a shallow longitudinal groove.
