= Astaena diversipennis =

Scientific classification
- Kingdom: Animalia
- Phylum: Arthropoda
- Class: Insecta
- Order: Coleoptera
- Suborder: Polyphaga
- Infraorder: Scarabaeiformia
- Family: Scarabaeidae
- Genus: Astaena
- Species: A. diversipennis

Binomial name
- Astaena diversipennis Lago, 2021

Species of beetle

Astaena diversipennis is a species of beetle of the family Scarabaeidae. It is found in Costa Rica.

== Description ==
Adults reach a length of about 8–10 mm. They are reddish brown, with the head, legs and abdomen shiny, while the remaining surfaces are opaque and velvety.

== Etymology ==
The name of the species is derived from Latin diversus (meaning different) and pennae (meaning wing) and refers to the distinctly different surface sculpturing on alternate elytral intervals.
