= Astaena clypealis =

Scientific classification
- Kingdom: Animalia
- Phylum: Arthropoda
- Clade: Pancrustacea
- Class: Insecta
- Order: Coleoptera
- Suborder: Polyphaga
- Infraorder: Scarabaeiformia
- Family: Scarabaeidae
- Genus: Astaena
- Species: A. clypealis

Binomial name
- Astaena clypealis Moser, 1921

Species of beetle

Astaena clypealis is a species of beetle of the family Scarabaeidae. It is found in Ecuador.

== Description ==
Adults reach a length of about 10–13 mm. The pronotum is dark reddish-brown with a deep continuous groove.
