= Astaena tucumana =

Scientific classification
- Kingdom: Animalia
- Phylum: Arthropoda
- Class: Insecta
- Order: Coleoptera
- Suborder: Polyphaga
- Infraorder: Scarabaeiformia
- Family: Scarabaeidae
- Genus: Astaena
- Species: A. tucumana

Binomial name
- Astaena tucumana Frey, 1974

Species of beetle

Astaena tucumana is a species of beetle of the family Scarabaeidae. It is found in Argentina.

== Description ==
Adults reach a length of about 7.5 mm. The upper and lower surfaces are blackish-brown and shiny. The antennae are yellow and the legs are reddish-brown. The back of the head is smooth in the middle, sparsely and unevenly punctate with medium-coarse and fine punctures. The pronotum is densely and coarsely, somewhat unevenly punctate and the elytra have almost continuous striae of punctures.
