= Astaena andina =

Scientific classification
- Kingdom: Animalia
- Phylum: Arthropoda
- Class: Insecta
- Order: Coleoptera
- Suborder: Polyphaga
- Infraorder: Scarabaeiformia
- Family: Scarabaeidae
- Genus: Astaena
- Species: A. andina

Binomial name
- Astaena andina Frey, 1973

Species of beetle

Astaena andina is a species of beetle of the family Scarabaeidae. It is found in Ecuador.

== Description ==
Adults reach a length of about 9 mm. The upper and lower surfaces are uniformly reddish-brown. The upper surface of the head is moderately finely and fairly evenly punctate, while the pronotum is densely and finely punctate with a smooth median line. The elytra have rows of punctures.
