= Astaena rufa =

Scientific classification
- Kingdom: Animalia
- Phylum: Arthropoda
- Clade: Pancrustacea
- Class: Insecta
- Order: Coleoptera
- Suborder: Polyphaga
- Infraorder: Scarabaeiformia
- Family: Scarabaeidae
- Genus: Astaena
- Species: A. rufa

Binomial name
- Astaena rufa Moser, 1921

Species of beetle

Astaena rufa is a species of beetle of the family Scarabaeidae. It is found in Brazil (Espírito Santo).

== Description ==
Adults reach a length of about 9 mm. They are reddish-brown.
