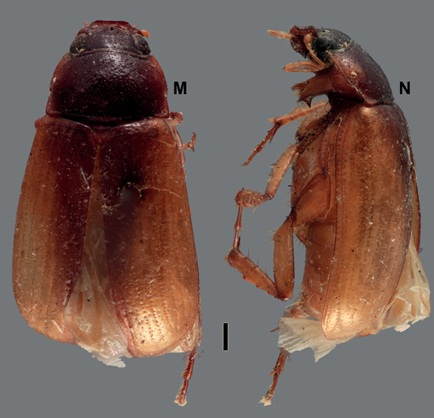

Scientific classification
- Kingdom: Animalia
- Phylum: Arthropoda
- Class: Insecta
- Order: Coleoptera
- Suborder: Polyphaga
- Infraorder: Scarabaeiformia
- Family: Scarabaeidae
- Genus: Astaena
- Species: A. bogotana

Binomial name
- Astaena bogotana Saylor, 1946

= Astaena bogotana =

Species of beetle

Astaena bogotana is a species of beetle of the family Scarabaeidae. It is found in Colombia.

Adults reach a length of about 12 mm. The head is reddish-brown with setae. The surface of the pronotum and elytra is without setae. The pronotum is unicolored reddish-brown, while the elytra are bicolored.
