= Astaena iridescens =

Scientific classification
- Kingdom: Animalia
- Phylum: Arthropoda
- Class: Insecta
- Order: Coleoptera
- Suborder: Polyphaga
- Infraorder: Scarabaeiformia
- Family: Scarabaeidae
- Genus: Astaena
- Species: A. iridescens

Binomial name
- Astaena iridescens Frey, 1974

Species of beetle

Astaena iridescens is a species of beetle of the family Scarabaeidae. It is found in Brazil (Bahia).

== Description ==
Adults reach a length of about 11–12 mm. The upper and lower surfaces are brown to dark brown, with the head usually somewhat darker. Males are a little lighter brown and their pronotum is more strongly iridescent. The pronotum of the females is shiny and slightly iridescent. The elytra are very strongly iridescent. The pronotum is finely, moderately densely, and somewhat irregularly punctate. The elytra have striae of punctures.
