= Astaena opaca =

Scientific classification
- Kingdom: Animalia
- Phylum: Arthropoda
- Class: Insecta
- Order: Coleoptera
- Suborder: Polyphaga
- Infraorder: Scarabaeiformia
- Family: Scarabaeidae
- Genus: Astaena
- Species: A. opaca

Binomial name
- Astaena opaca Frey, 1973

Species of beetle

Astaena opaca is a species of beetle of the family Scarabaeidae. It is found in Ecuador.

== Description ==
Adults reach a length of about 12 mm. The elytra are reddish-brown and very sparsely covered with long, light brown, erect setae. The clypeus and head are glossy, while the remaining upper and lower surfaces are dull and tomentose.
