= Astaena vilifrons =

Scientific classification
- Kingdom: Animalia
- Phylum: Arthropoda
- Class: Insecta
- Order: Coleoptera
- Suborder: Polyphaga
- Infraorder: Scarabaeiformia
- Family: Scarabaeidae
- Genus: Astaena
- Species: A. vilifrons

Binomial name
- Astaena vilifrons Lago, 2021

Species of beetle

Astaena vilifrons is a species of beetle of the family Scarabaeidae. It is found in Costa Rica and Panama.

== Description ==
Adults reach a length of about 8–9 mm. They are reddish brown, with the head, legs and abdomen shiny. The pronotum and elytra are dull, the dorsum weakly opalescent.

== Etymology ==
The species name is derived from Latin villos (meaning hairy) and frons (meaning forehead) and refers to the dense covering of setae on the frons.
