= Astaena brasiliana =

Scientific classification
- Kingdom: Animalia
- Phylum: Arthropoda
- Clade: Pancrustacea
- Class: Insecta
- Order: Coleoptera
- Suborder: Polyphaga
- Infraorder: Scarabaeiformia
- Family: Scarabaeidae
- Genus: Astaena
- Species: A. brasiliana

Binomial name
- Astaena brasiliana Moser, 1918

Species of beetle

Astaena brasiliana is a species of beetle of the family Scarabaeidae. It is found in Brazil.

== Description ==
Adults reach a length of about 3.5 mm. The body is short and not noticeably elongated. They are reddish-brown. The pronotum is scarcely punctate, with the anterior and posterior lateral margins straight.
