= Astaena oblonga =

Scientific classification
- Kingdom: Animalia
- Phylum: Arthropoda
- Clade: Pancrustacea
- Class: Insecta
- Order: Coleoptera
- Suborder: Polyphaga
- Infraorder: Scarabaeiformia
- Family: Scarabaeidae
- Genus: Astaena
- Species: A. oblonga

Binomial name
- Astaena oblonga Moser, 1918

Species of beetle

Astaena oblonga is a species of beetle of the family Scarabaeidae. It is found in Colombia.

== Description ==
Adults reach a length of about 12–14 mm. The pronotal margins are weakly and evenly rounded, with the base narrower than the middle. The elytra are densely covered with very short, pale pubescence.
