= Astaena baroni =

Scientific classification
- Kingdom: Animalia
- Phylum: Arthropoda
- Clade: Pancrustacea
- Class: Insecta
- Order: Coleoptera
- Suborder: Polyphaga
- Infraorder: Scarabaeiformia
- Family: Scarabaeidae
- Genus: Astaena
- Species: A. baroni

Binomial name
- Astaena baroni Moser, 1918

Species of beetle

Astaena baroni is a species of beetle of the family Scarabaeidae. It is found in Ecuador.

== Description ==
Adults reach a length of about 10 mm. The pronotum is widest at the base and without a lateral projection. The lateral margin is concave and the elytral pubescence is moderately dense. They are light-colored, with short, erect hairs. The elytra however, are dark brown.
