= Astaena simulatrix =

Scientific classification
- Kingdom: Animalia
- Phylum: Arthropoda
- Class: Insecta
- Order: Coleoptera
- Suborder: Polyphaga
- Infraorder: Scarabaeiformia
- Family: Scarabaeidae
- Genus: Astaena
- Species: A. simulatrix

Binomial name
- Astaena simulatrix Frey, 1974

Species of beetle

Astaena simulatrix is a species of beetle of the family Scarabaeidae. It is found in Bolivia.

== Description ==
Adults reach a length of about 7.5–8 mm. The upper and lower surfaces are dark reddish-yellow and shiny. The antennae are brownish. The pronotum is densely, finely, and fairly evenly punctate and the lateral margins (as well as the margins of the elytra) are fringed with light brown cilia. The elytra have punctate striae.
