= Astaena omega =

Scientific classification
- Kingdom: Animalia
- Phylum: Arthropoda
- Class: Insecta
- Order: Coleoptera
- Suborder: Polyphaga
- Infraorder: Scarabaeiformia
- Family: Scarabaeidae
- Genus: Astaena
- Species: A. omega

Binomial name
- Astaena omega Lago, 2021

Species of beetle

Astaena omega is a species of beetle of the family Scarabaeidae. It is found in Costa Rica.

== Description ==
Adults reach a length of about 8.5–10 mm. They are dark reddish brown, with the dorsum, legs, abdomen and most of the venter smooth and shiny. The lateral margins of the pronotum, scutellum, ninth elytral intervals and elytral epipleura are pruinose. There is dense microsculpture on the shiny surfaces.

== Etymology ==
The species is named for the 24th and final letter in the Greek alphabet.
