= Astaena cordobana =

Scientific classification
- Kingdom: Animalia
- Phylum: Arthropoda
- Clade: Pancrustacea
- Class: Insecta
- Order: Coleoptera
- Suborder: Polyphaga
- Infraorder: Scarabaeiformia
- Family: Scarabaeidae
- Genus: Astaena
- Species: A. cordobana

Binomial name
- Astaena cordobana Moser, 1921

Species of beetle

Astaena cordobana is a species of beetle of the family Scarabaeidae. It is found in Argentina and Bolivia.

== Description ==
Adults reach a length of about 8–9 mm. They are light brown to dark brown.
