= Astaena exquisita =

Scientific classification
- Kingdom: Animalia
- Phylum: Arthropoda
- Class: Insecta
- Order: Coleoptera
- Suborder: Polyphaga
- Infraorder: Scarabaeiformia
- Family: Scarabaeidae
- Genus: Astaena
- Species: A. exquisita

Binomial name
- Astaena exquisita Frey, 1973

Species of beetle

Astaena exquisita is a species of beetle of the family Scarabaeidae. It is found in Peru.

== Description ==
Adults reach a length of about 8—8.5 mm. The head and elytra are pitch-brown with a violet sheen. In males, the elytra are silky-shiny and the pronotum is reddish-yellow, while it is dull in females.
