= Astaena tomentosa =

Scientific classification
- Kingdom: Animalia
- Phylum: Arthropoda
- Class: Insecta
- Order: Coleoptera
- Suborder: Polyphaga
- Infraorder: Scarabaeiformia
- Family: Scarabaeidae
- Genus: Astaena
- Species: A. tomentosa

Binomial name
- Astaena tomentosa Frey, 1973

Species of beetle

Astaena tomentosa is a species of beetle of the family Scarabaeidae. It is found in Ecuador.

== Description ==
Adults reach a length of about 10–12 mm. They are blackish-brown, slightly reddish. The elytra are strongly tomentose.
