= Astaena negligens =

Scientific classification
- Kingdom: Animalia
- Phylum: Arthropoda
- Clade: Pancrustacea
- Class: Insecta
- Order: Coleoptera
- Suborder: Polyphaga
- Infraorder: Scarabaeiformia
- Family: Scarabaeidae
- Genus: Astaena
- Species: A. negligens

Binomial name
- Astaena negligens Frey, 1973

Species of beetle

Astaena negligens is a species of beetle of the family Scarabaeidae. It is found in Peru.

== Description ==
Adults reach a length of about 9 mm. The pronotum is rather coarsely and moderately densely punctate, with the anterior and lateral margins fringed with long, light brown cilia. The dorsal surface is light reddish-brown. The elytra have striae of punctures. The antennae are yellow.
