= Astaena valida =

Scientific classification
- Kingdom: Animalia
- Phylum: Arthropoda
- Class: Insecta
- Order: Coleoptera
- Suborder: Polyphaga
- Infraorder: Scarabaeiformia
- Family: Scarabaeidae
- Genus: Astaena
- Species: A. valida

Binomial name
- Astaena valida Burmeister, 1855

Species of beetle

Astaena valida is a species of beetle of the family Scarabaeidae. It is found in Colombia.

== Description ==
Adults reach a length of about 11–12 mm. The upper surface is strongly shiny and the pronotum is rather coarsely punctate. The upper surface is reddish-brown to blackish-brown.
