= Astaena pauloensis =

Scientific classification
- Kingdom: Animalia
- Phylum: Arthropoda
- Class: Insecta
- Order: Coleoptera
- Suborder: Polyphaga
- Infraorder: Scarabaeiformia
- Family: Scarabaeidae
- Genus: Astaena
- Species: A. pauloensis

Binomial name
- Astaena pauloensis Frey, 1973

Species of beetle

Astaena pauloensis is a species of beetle of the family Scarabaeidae. It is found in Brazil (São Paulo).

== Description ==
Adults reach a length of about 12 mm. The upper surface is brown to dark brown, with the pronotum darker than the elytra. The elytra have rows of punctures. The antennae are yellow.
