= Astaena minuta =

Scientific classification
- Kingdom: Animalia
- Phylum: Arthropoda
- Class: Insecta
- Order: Coleoptera
- Suborder: Polyphaga
- Infraorder: Scarabaeiformia
- Family: Scarabaeidae
- Genus: Astaena
- Species: A. minuta

Binomial name
- Astaena minuta Lago, 2021

Species of beetle

Astaena minuta is a species of beetle of the family Scarabaeidae. It is found in Costa Rica.

== Description ==
Adults reach a length of about 7-7.8 mm. They are reddish brown, with the head legs and posterior segments of the abdomen shiny and the pronotum, elytra, pygidium and venter of the thorax opaque. The elytra, pronotum, metasternum and anterior abdomen are lightly pruinose.

== Etymology ==
The species name is derived from Latin minutus (meaning small) and refers to the small size of the males of this species.
