= Astaena ocellata =

Scientific classification
- Kingdom: Animalia
- Phylum: Arthropoda
- Class: Insecta
- Order: Coleoptera
- Suborder: Polyphaga
- Infraorder: Scarabaeiformia
- Family: Scarabaeidae
- Genus: Astaena
- Species: A. ocellata

Binomial name
- Astaena ocellata Lago, 2021

Species of beetle

Astaena ocellata is a species of beetle of the family Scarabaeidae. It is found in Costa Rica.

== Description ==
Adults reach a length of about 6.5–8 mm. They are reddish brown, with the head, pronotum, legs and abdomen moderately shiny to shiny. The elytra are opaque, pruinose and weakly opalescent. The abdomen and legs are testaceous or brownish testaceous. All surfaces have large ocellate punctures.

== Etymology ==
The species name is derived from Latin ocellus (meaning little eye) and refers to the ocellate punctures on the dorsal surface of the elytra.
