= Astaena ohausi =

Scientific classification
- Kingdom: Animalia
- Phylum: Arthropoda
- Clade: Pancrustacea
- Class: Insecta
- Order: Coleoptera
- Suborder: Polyphaga
- Infraorder: Scarabaeiformia
- Family: Scarabaeidae
- Genus: Astaena
- Species: A. ohausi

Binomial name
- Astaena ohausi Moser, 1921

Species of beetle

Astaena ohausi is a species of beetle of the family Scarabaeidae. It is found in Brazil (São Paulo).

== Description ==
Adults reach a length of about 6–7 mm. They are yellowish-brown. The back of the head is very finely and densely punctate.
