= Astaena moseri =

Scientific classification
- Kingdom: Animalia
- Phylum: Arthropoda
- Class: Insecta
- Order: Coleoptera
- Suborder: Polyphaga
- Infraorder: Scarabaeiformia
- Family: Scarabaeidae
- Genus: Astaena
- Species: A. moseri

Binomial name
- Astaena moseri Frey, 1973

Species of beetle

Astaena moseri is a species of beetle of the family Scarabaeidae. It is found in Peru.

== Description ==
Adults reach a length of about 8–10 mm. They are very similar to Astaena peruensis and Astaena andicola. The upper surface is moderately dense and somewhat coarsely punctate. The elytra are finely punctate in striae. The antennae are yellow.
