= Astaena dichromia =

Scientific classification
- Kingdom: Animalia
- Phylum: Arthropoda
- Class: Insecta
- Order: Coleoptera
- Suborder: Polyphaga
- Infraorder: Scarabaeiformia
- Family: Scarabaeidae
- Genus: Astaena
- Species: A. dichromia

Binomial name
- Astaena dichromia Lago, 2021

Species of beetle

Astaena dichromia is a species of beetle of the family Scarabaeidae. It is found in Costa Rica.

== Description ==
Adults reach a length of about 9 mm. The anterior clypeus and scutellum are dark reddish brown and the pronotum is reddish brown. The posterior clypeus, frons, vertex and elytra are nearly black.

== Etymology ==
The name of the species is derived from Greek di (meaning two) and chroma (meaning color) and refers to the bicolored dorsum.
