= Astaena bahiana =

Scientific classification
- Kingdom: Animalia
- Phylum: Arthropoda
- Clade: Pancrustacea
- Class: Insecta
- Order: Coleoptera
- Suborder: Polyphaga
- Infraorder: Scarabaeiformia
- Family: Scarabaeidae
- Genus: Astaena
- Species: A. bahiana

Binomial name
- Astaena bahiana Moser, 1918

Species of beetle

Astaena bahiana is a species of beetle of the family Scarabaeidae. It is found in Brazil (Bahia, São Paulo) and Colombia.

== Description ==
Adults reach a length of about 10–12 mm. They have a reddish-brown, somewhat silky shimmering, elongate body. The pygidium, abdomen and legs are shiny. The head is rather densely punctate and bears some setae arising from stronger punctures.
