= Astaena hirsuta =

Scientific classification
- Kingdom: Animalia
- Phylum: Arthropoda
- Class: Insecta
- Order: Coleoptera
- Suborder: Polyphaga
- Infraorder: Scarabaeiformia
- Family: Scarabaeidae
- Genus: Astaena
- Species: A. hirsuta

Binomial name
- Astaena hirsuta Frey, 1973

Species of beetle

Astaena hirsuta is a species of beetle of the family Scarabaeidae. It is found in Ecuador.

== Description ==
Adults reach a length of about 11 mm. The elytra are moderately glossy and the upper and lower surfaces are brown. The frons is somewhat more finely and very densely punctate and the head, pronotum, elytra, pygidium and underside all have short, very fine light brown hairs.
