= Astaena forsteri =

Scientific classification
- Kingdom: Animalia
- Phylum: Arthropoda
- Class: Insecta
- Order: Coleoptera
- Suborder: Polyphaga
- Infraorder: Scarabaeiformia
- Family: Scarabaeidae
- Genus: Astaena
- Species: A. forsteri

Binomial name
- Astaena forsteri Frey, 1974

Species of beetle

Astaena forsteri is a species of beetle of the family Scarabaeidae. It is found in Bolivia.

== Description ==
Adults reach a length of about 14 mm. The upper and lower surfaces are reddish-brown (with the disc of the pronotum is slightly darker), dull and tomentose. The head is shiny and the elytra are opalescent. The legs are shiny and the pronotum and elytra have long and sparse light brown cilia. There are a few erect setae on the disc of the pronotum and (very sparsely) on the elytra. The pronotum is very fine, very sparsely and irregularly punctured by the tomentum and the elytra have very fine, scarcely punctured striae.
