= Astaena confusa =

Scientific classification
- Kingdom: Animalia
- Phylum: Arthropoda
- Class: Insecta
- Order: Coleoptera
- Suborder: Polyphaga
- Infraorder: Scarabaeiformia
- Family: Scarabaeidae
- Genus: Astaena
- Species: A. confusa

Binomial name
- Astaena confusa Lago, 2021

Species of beetle

Astaena confusa is a species of beetle of the family Scarabaeidae. It is found in Costa Rica.

== Description ==
Adults reach a length of about 8-8.5 mm. They are dark chestnut brown body, with the head, legs, abdomen and pygidium shiny. The pronotum, elytra, and venter of the thorax are pruinose, and the pronotum and elytra are sericeous.

== Etymology ==
The name of the species refers to the confusion caused by Georg Frey in his 1973 paper with regard to the identity of this species.
