= Astaena rufescens =

Scientific classification
- Kingdom: Animalia
- Phylum: Arthropoda
- Class: Insecta
- Order: Coleoptera
- Suborder: Polyphaga
- Infraorder: Scarabaeiformia
- Family: Scarabaeidae
- Genus: Astaena
- Species: A. rufescens

Binomial name
- Astaena rufescens Frey, 1973

Species of beetle

Astaena rufescens is a species of beetle of the family Scarabaeidae. It is found in Brazil (Santa Catarina).

== Description ==
Adults reach a length of about 8–9 mm. The upper and lower surfaces are reddish-brown. The posterior half of the upper surface is unevenly sparsely punctate, the back of the head similarly but very sparsely punctate. The elytra have punctate stria.
