= Astaena nitens =

Scientific classification
- Kingdom: Animalia
- Phylum: Arthropoda
- Class: Insecta
- Order: Coleoptera
- Suborder: Polyphaga
- Infraorder: Scarabaeiformia
- Family: Scarabaeidae
- Genus: Astaena
- Species: A. nitens

Binomial name
- Astaena nitens Frey, 1976

Species of beetle

Astaena nitens is a species of beetle of the family Scarabaeidae. It is found in Brazil (Bahia).

== Description ==
Adults reach a length of about 6 mm. The upper and lower surfaces are light brown. The upper surface is strongly shiny and the lateral margin of the pronotum is sparsely fringed with light brown hairs, as is the tip of the pygidium. The rest of the upper surface is glabrous. The antennae are yellow.
