= Astaena nitidula =

Scientific classification
- Kingdom: Animalia
- Phylum: Arthropoda
- Clade: Pancrustacea
- Class: Insecta
- Order: Coleoptera
- Suborder: Polyphaga
- Infraorder: Scarabaeiformia
- Family: Scarabaeidae
- Genus: Astaena
- Species: A. nitidula

Binomial name
- Astaena nitidula Moser, 1918

Species of beetle

Astaena nitidula is a species of beetle of the family Scarabaeidae. It is found in Colombia.

== Description ==
Adults reach a length of about 10 mm. They are shiny, with the upper surface blackish-brown, while the under surface is brown. The head is sparsely punctate, while the surface bears moderately dense punctation.
