= Astaena brevisetosa =

Scientific classification
- Kingdom: Animalia
- Phylum: Arthropoda
- Class: Insecta
- Order: Coleoptera
- Suborder: Polyphaga
- Infraorder: Scarabaeiformia
- Family: Scarabaeidae
- Genus: Astaena
- Species: A. brevisetosa

Binomial name
- Astaena brevisetosa Lago, 2021

Species of beetle

Astaena brevisetosa is a species of beetle of the family Scarabaeidae. It is found in Costa Rica.

== Description ==
Adults reach a length of about 9 mm. They have a chestnut brown colour and are mostly opaque, with medium sericeous reflections. The lateral margins of the pronotum are lighter yellowish brown and the head and legs are shiny. The abdomen is moderately shiny. The pronotal disc has a few long erect setae, while the elytra is covered with short erect setae.

== Etymology ==
The name of the species is derived from Latin brevis (meaning short) and saeta (meaning bristle or stiff hair) and refers the uniformly short elytral setae.
