= Astaena kuehnelti =

Scientific classification
- Kingdom: Animalia
- Phylum: Arthropoda
- Class: Insecta
- Order: Coleoptera
- Suborder: Polyphaga
- Infraorder: Scarabaeiformia
- Family: Scarabaeidae
- Genus: Astaena
- Species: A. kuehnelti

Binomial name
- Astaena kuehnelti Frey, 1973

Species of beetle

Astaena kuehnelti is a species of beetle of the family Scarabaeidae. It is found in Venezuela.

== Description ==
Adults reach a length of about 10–11 mm. The upper surface, including the pygidium, is reddish-brown and highly glossy. The underside, legs and antennae are yellowish-brown and glossy.

== Etymology ==
The species is named after Prof. Kühnelt.
