= Astaena sericea =

Scientific classification
- Kingdom: Animalia
- Phylum: Arthropoda
- Class: Insecta
- Order: Coleoptera
- Suborder: Polyphaga
- Infraorder: Scarabaeiformia
- Family: Scarabaeidae
- Genus: Astaena
- Species: A. sericea

Binomial name
- Astaena sericea Frey, 1973

Species of beetle

Astaena sericea is a species of beetle of the family Scarabaeidae. It is found in Argentina.

== Description ==
Adults reach a length of about 8–10 mm. The elytra and pronotum are shiny with a silky sheen. The upper and lower surfaces are reddish-brown. The posterior part and the back of the head are very densely and finely punctate. The lateral margins of the pronotum are sparsely fringed with pale hairs and sometimes also some setae on the disc. The pronotum is very densely, finely and evenly punctate except for some smooth spots on the lateral margin. The elytra have a few coarse punctate striae.
