= Astaena marginithorax =

Scientific classification
- Kingdom: Animalia
- Phylum: Arthropoda
- Class: Insecta
- Order: Coleoptera
- Suborder: Polyphaga
- Infraorder: Scarabaeiformia
- Family: Scarabaeidae
- Genus: Astaena
- Species: A. marginithorax

Binomial name
- Astaena marginithorax Frey, 1973

Species of beetle

Astaena marginithorax is a species of beetle of the family Scarabaeidae. It is found in Ecuador.

== Description ==
Adults reach a length of about 11 mm. They are blackish-brown and strongly glossy. The elytra are punctate in rows, with the intervals irregularly and very sparsely covered with punctures. The underside is light reddish-brown, with the legs slightly darkened. The antennae are brown.
