= Astaena aequatorialis =

Scientific classification
- Kingdom: Animalia
- Phylum: Arthropoda
- Class: Insecta
- Order: Coleoptera
- Suborder: Polyphaga
- Infraorder: Scarabaeiformia
- Family: Scarabaeidae
- Genus: Astaena
- Species: A. aequatorialis

Binomial name
- Astaena aequatorialis Kirsch, 1885

Species of beetle

Astaena aequatorialis is a species of beetle of the family Scarabaeidae. It is found in Ecuador.

== Description ==
Adults reach a length of about 11 mm. They are light brown and faintly shiny.
