= Astaena ratcliffei =

Scientific classification
- Kingdom: Animalia
- Phylum: Arthropoda
- Clade: Pancrustacea
- Class: Insecta
- Order: Coleoptera
- Suborder: Polyphaga
- Infraorder: Scarabaeiformia
- Family: Scarabaeidae
- Genus: Astaena
- Species: A. ratcliffei

Binomial name
- Astaena ratcliffei Lago, 2021

Species of beetle

Astaena ratcliffei is a species of beetle of the family Scarabaeidae. It is found in Costa Rica.

== Description ==
Adults reach a length of about 7–9 mm. They are reddish brown, with the legs lighter. Both the head and legs are shiny, while the abdomen is moderately shiny. The pronotum, elytra and thoracic venter are pruinose, the pronotum and elytra weakly sericeous.

== Etymology ==
The species is named after Dr. Brett C. Ratcliffe, lead collector of the first specimen examined.
