= Astaena argentina =

Scientific classification
- Kingdom: Animalia
- Phylum: Arthropoda
- Clade: Pancrustacea
- Class: Insecta
- Order: Coleoptera
- Suborder: Polyphaga
- Infraorder: Scarabaeiformia
- Family: Scarabaeidae
- Genus: Astaena
- Species: A. argentina

Binomial name
- Astaena argentina Moser, 1921

Species of beetle

Astaena argentina is a species of beetle of the family Scarabaeidae. It is found in Argentina.

== Description ==
Adults reach a length of about 9 mm. The pronotum is densely and finely punctate with some erect hairs. Adults are nearly identical to Astaena truncaticeps and can only be definitively separated by their parameters.
