= Astaena sigma =

Scientific classification
- Kingdom: Animalia
- Phylum: Arthropoda
- Class: Insecta
- Order: Coleoptera
- Suborder: Polyphaga
- Infraorder: Scarabaeiformia
- Family: Scarabaeidae
- Genus: Astaena
- Species: A. sigma

Binomial name
- Astaena sigma Lago, 2021

Species of beetle

Astaena sigma is a species of beetle of the family Scarabaeidae. It is found in Costa Rica and Panama.

== Description ==
Adults reach a length of about 7-8.5 mm. They are reddish brown, with the head and legs moderately shiny, the pygidium and abdomen with shiny and dull areas and the pronotum, elytra, and thoracic venter dull. The dorsum is weakly opalescent, and the pronotum and elytra are pruinose.

== Etymology ==
The species name is derived from Greek Sigma (the letter S) and refers to the S-shaped parameres of the species.
