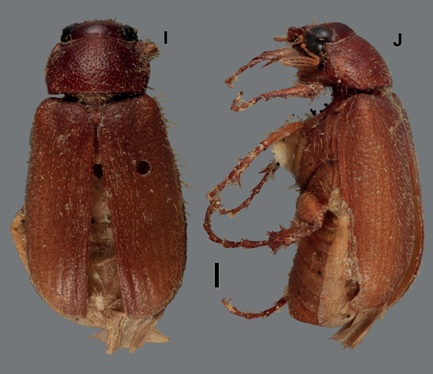

Scientific classification
- Kingdom: Animalia
- Phylum: Arthropoda
- Class: Insecta
- Order: Coleoptera
- Suborder: Polyphaga
- Infraorder: Scarabaeiformia
- Family: Scarabaeidae
- Genus: Astaena
- Species: A. maqueta

Binomial name
- Astaena maqueta Saylor, 1946

= Astaena maqueta =

Species of beetle

Astaena maqueta is a species of beetle of the family Scarabaeidae. It is found in Argentina.

== Description ==
Adults reach a length of about 12 mm. The head is reddish-brown with upright setae. The surface of the pronotum and elytra also has upright setae and both are unicolored reddish-brown.
