= Astaena heterophylla =

Scientific classification
- Kingdom: Animalia
- Phylum: Arthropoda
- Clade: Pancrustacea
- Class: Insecta
- Order: Coleoptera
- Suborder: Polyphaga
- Infraorder: Scarabaeiformia
- Family: Scarabaeidae
- Genus: Astaena
- Species: A. heterophylla

Binomial name
- Astaena heterophylla Moser, 1921

Species of beetle

Astaena heterophylla is a species of beetle of the family Scarabaeidae. It is found in Bolivia.

== Description ==
Adults reach a length of about 8 mm. They are rufous-fuscous, oblong body. The frons is quite densely punctate.
