= Astaena opalipennis =

Scientific classification
- Kingdom: Animalia
- Phylum: Arthropoda
- Class: Insecta
- Order: Coleoptera
- Suborder: Polyphaga
- Infraorder: Scarabaeiformia
- Family: Scarabaeidae
- Genus: Astaena
- Species: A. opalipennis

Binomial name
- Astaena opalipennis Frey, 1973

Species of beetle

Astaena opalipennis is a species of beetle of the family Scarabaeidae. It is found in Brazil (Espírito Santo).

== Description ==
Adults reach a length of about 13 mm. They have an elongate egg-shaped body. The pronotum is finely and sparsely punctate and the elytra have fine striae of punctures. The antennae are brown.
