= Astaena callosipygus =

Scientific classification
- Kingdom: Animalia
- Phylum: Arthropoda
- Class: Insecta
- Order: Coleoptera
- Suborder: Polyphaga
- Infraorder: Scarabaeiformia
- Family: Scarabaeidae
- Genus: Astaena
- Species: A. callosipygus

Binomial name
- Astaena callosipygus Frey, 1973

Species of beetle

Astaena callosipygus is a species of beetle of the family Scarabaeidae. It is found in Bolivia.

== Description ==
Adults reach a length of about 6-6.5 mm. They are reddish-brown. The head, pronotum and legs are shiny, while the elytra and thorax are dull.
