= Astaena insulana =

Scientific classification
- Kingdom: Animalia
- Phylum: Arthropoda
- Clade: Pancrustacea
- Class: Insecta
- Order: Coleoptera
- Suborder: Polyphaga
- Infraorder: Scarabaeiformia
- Family: Scarabaeidae
- Genus: Astaena
- Species: A. insulana

Binomial name
- Astaena insulana Moser, 1918

Species of beetle

Astaena insulana is a species of beetle of the family Scarabaeidae. It is found in Trinidad and Tobago.

== Description ==
Adults reach a length of about 8–9 mm. The pronotum and elytra are faintly glossy, sometimes slightly tomentose.
