= Astaena lurida =

Scientific classification
- Kingdom: Animalia
- Phylum: Arthropoda
- Clade: Pancrustacea
- Class: Insecta
- Order: Coleoptera
- Suborder: Polyphaga
- Infraorder: Scarabaeiformia
- Family: Scarabaeidae
- Genus: Astaena
- Species: A. lurida

Binomial name
- Astaena lurida Moser, 1918

Species of beetle

Astaena lurida is a species of beetle of the family Scarabaeidae. It is found in Bolivia.

== Description ==
Adults reach a length of about 8 mm. They are similar to Astaena pectoralis in shape and coloration, but may be distinguished by the shape of the pronotum. They are yellowish-brown, with the head and pronotum more reddish. The head is rather sparsely punctate.
