= Astaena saylori =

Scientific classification
- Kingdom: Animalia
- Phylum: Arthropoda
- Class: Insecta
- Order: Coleoptera
- Suborder: Polyphaga
- Infraorder: Scarabaeiformia
- Family: Scarabaeidae
- Genus: Astaena
- Species: A. saylori

Binomial name
- Astaena saylori Frey, 1973

Species of beetle

Astaena saylori is a species of beetle of the family Scarabaeidae. It is found in Argentina.

== Description ==
Adults reach a length of about 9 mm. The pronotum is densely punctate and somewhat silky-glossy. The elytra are moderately densely and finely punctate, without ribs, but with punctate striae. The antennae are yellow.
