= Astaena hirtella =

Scientific classification
- Kingdom: Animalia
- Phylum: Arthropoda
- Class: Insecta
- Order: Coleoptera
- Suborder: Polyphaga
- Infraorder: Scarabaeiformia
- Family: Scarabaeidae
- Genus: Astaena
- Species: A. hirtella

Binomial name
- Astaena hirtella Frey, 1973

Species of beetle

Astaena hirtella is a species of beetle of the family Scarabaeidae. It is found in Bolivia.

== Description ==
Adults reach a length of about 10 mm. They have an elongated, convex body. The upper surface is dark reddish-brown, while the pygidium, underside, legs and antennae are light brown.
