= Astaena capillata =

Scientific classification
- Kingdom: Animalia
- Phylum: Arthropoda
- Clade: Pancrustacea
- Class: Insecta
- Order: Coleoptera
- Suborder: Polyphaga
- Infraorder: Scarabaeiformia
- Family: Scarabaeidae
- Genus: Astaena
- Species: A. capillata

Binomial name
- Astaena capillata Moser, 1918

Species of beetle

Astaena capillata is a species of beetle of the family Scarabaeidae. It is found in Bolivia.

== Description ==
Adults reach a length of about 6–7 mm. They are brown and shiny, while the head and pronotum are reddish. All the punctures on the upper surface are marked with short hairs. The frons is quite densely punctured. The pronotum is fairly densely punctured and the elytra are rather closely punctured.
