= Astaena leechi =

Scientific classification
- Kingdom: Animalia
- Phylum: Arthropoda
- Class: Insecta
- Order: Coleoptera
- Suborder: Polyphaga
- Infraorder: Scarabaeiformia
- Family: Scarabaeidae
- Genus: Astaena
- Species: A. leechi

Binomial name
- Astaena leechi Frey, 1973

Species of beetle

Astaena leechi is a species of beetle of the family Scarabaeidae. It is found in Argentina.

== Description ==
Adults reach a length of about 7–8 mm. The pronotum is light brown, the head somewhat darker and the antennae yellow. The elytra have striae of punctures and the pronotum and pygidium are densely and finely punctate.
