= Astaena splendens =

Scientific classification
- Kingdom: Animalia
- Phylum: Arthropoda
- Class: Insecta
- Order: Coleoptera
- Suborder: Polyphaga
- Infraorder: Scarabaeiformia
- Family: Scarabaeidae
- Genus: Astaena
- Species: A. splendens

Binomial name
- Astaena splendens Frey, 1973

Species of beetle

Astaena splendens is a species of beetle of the family Scarabaeidae. It is found in Brazil (Espírito Santo).

== Description ==
Adults reach a length of about 7–9 mm. The upper surface is reddish-brown, strongly shiny and coarsely and sparsely punctate laterally, but smooth in the middle. The elytra have striae of punctures. The antennae are yellow.
