= Astaena fortuna =

Scientific classification
- Kingdom: Animalia
- Phylum: Arthropoda
- Class: Insecta
- Order: Coleoptera
- Suborder: Polyphaga
- Infraorder: Scarabaeiformia
- Family: Scarabaeidae
- Genus: Astaena
- Species: A. fortuna

Binomial name
- Astaena fortuna Lago, 2021

Species of beetle

Astaena fortuna is a species of beetle of the family Scarabaeidae. It is found in Panama.

== Description ==
Adults reach a length of about 9-10.5 mm. They are reddish brown. Most of the dorsum and legs is smooth and shiny. The elytral epipleura and ninth interval, thoracic venter and abdomen are pruinose. All surfaces have dense, weak to strong microsculpture and micropunctures.

== Etymology ==
The name of the species refers to its type locality, Reserva la Fortuna.
