= Astaena macilenta =

Scientific classification
- Kingdom: Animalia
- Phylum: Arthropoda
- Class: Insecta
- Order: Coleoptera
- Suborder: Polyphaga
- Infraorder: Scarabaeiformia
- Family: Scarabaeidae
- Genus: Astaena
- Species: A. macilenta

Binomial name
- Astaena macilenta Bates, 1887

Species of beetle

Astaena macilenta is a species of beetle of the family Scarabaeidae. It is found in Costa Rica and possibly Honduras.

== Description ==
Adults reach a length of about 6.5–10 mm. They are medium yellowish red, with the pronotum and elytra pruinose and opalescent. The head is moderately shiny.

== Etymology ==
The species name is probably derived from Latin macilenta (meaning thin) with reference to the narrow body of the species.
