= Astaena cognata =

Scientific classification
- Kingdom: Animalia
- Phylum: Arthropoda
- Class: Insecta
- Order: Coleoptera
- Suborder: Polyphaga
- Infraorder: Scarabaeiformia
- Family: Scarabaeidae
- Genus: Astaena
- Species: A. cognata

Binomial name
- Astaena cognata Burmeister, 1855

Species of beetle

Astaena cognata is a species of beetle of the family Scarabaeidae. It is found in Colombia.

== Description ==
Adults reach a length of about 10 mm. They have a reddish-brown, oblong body.
