= Astaena rotundiceps =

Scientific classification
- Kingdom: Animalia
- Phylum: Arthropoda
- Class: Insecta
- Order: Coleoptera
- Suborder: Polyphaga
- Infraorder: Scarabaeiformia
- Family: Scarabaeidae
- Genus: Astaena
- Species: A. rotundiceps

Binomial name
- Astaena rotundiceps Frey, 1973

Species of beetle

Astaena rotundiceps is a species of beetle of the family Scarabaeidae. It is found in Brazil (Espírito Santo).

== Description ==
Adults reach a length of about 7 mm. The upper and lower surfaces are shiny blackish-brown. The head is sparsely, moderately, fairly evenly punctate. The pronotum is coarsely, sparsely, somewhat irregularly punctate. The elytra are coarsely punctured, mostly in rows, but without forming distinct lines. The antennae are yellowish-brown.
