= Astaena columbiensis =

Scientific classification
- Kingdom: Animalia
- Phylum: Arthropoda
- Clade: Pancrustacea
- Class: Insecta
- Order: Coleoptera
- Suborder: Polyphaga
- Infraorder: Scarabaeiformia
- Family: Scarabaeidae
- Genus: Astaena
- Species: A. columbiensis

Binomial name
- Astaena columbiensis Moser, 1918

Species of beetle

Astaena columbiensis is a species of beetle of the family Scarabaeidae. It is found in Colombia.

== Description ==
Adults reach a length of about 9 mm. They are dark brown above, but yellowish-brown below. They are mostly shiny, but the elytra and thorax are dull. The head is moderately densely and finely punctate. The surface is moderately densely dotted and the elytra have rows of punctures.
