= Astaena tridentata =

Scientific classification
- Kingdom: Animalia
- Phylum: Arthropoda
- Class: Insecta
- Order: Coleoptera
- Suborder: Polyphaga
- Infraorder: Scarabaeiformia
- Family: Scarabaeidae
- Genus: Astaena
- Species: A. tridentata

Binomial name
- Astaena tridentata Erichson, 1847

Species of beetle

Astaena tridentata is a species of beetle of the family Scarabaeidae. It is found in Ecuador and Peru.

== Description ==
Adults reach a length of about 9–10 mm. The pronotum is not convex and the surface is simply punctate or smooth, but sometimes also hairy. The antennae are brown to dark brown and faintly shiny.
