= Astaena inbio =

Scientific classification
- Kingdom: Animalia
- Phylum: Arthropoda
- Class: Insecta
- Order: Coleoptera
- Suborder: Polyphaga
- Infraorder: Scarabaeiformia
- Family: Scarabaeidae
- Genus: Astaena
- Species: A. inbio

Binomial name
- Astaena inbio Lago, 2021

Species of beetle

Astaena inbio is a species of beetle of the family Scarabaeidae. It is found in Costa Rica.

== Description ==
Adults reach a length of about 8–9 mm. They are bright reddish brown, with the dorsum, pygidium, legs and abdomen smooth and shiny. The metasternum is moderately shiny, with the anterior and lateral edges lightly pruinose. The elytral epipleura, prosternum, metepisternum and metacoxal plates are dull and pruinose. Most surfaces have dense microsculpture.

== Etymology ==
The species is named for the Instituto Nacional de Biodiversidad in Costa Rica.
