= Astaena rosettae =

Scientific classification
- Kingdom: Animalia
- Phylum: Arthropoda
- Class: Insecta
- Order: Coleoptera
- Suborder: Polyphaga
- Infraorder: Scarabaeiformia
- Family: Scarabaeidae
- Genus: Astaena
- Species: A. rosettae

Binomial name
- Astaena rosettae Frey, 1973

Species of beetle

Astaena rosettae is a species of beetle of the family Scarabaeidae. It is found in Brazil (Espírito Santo).

== Description ==
Adults reach a length of about 9–10 mm. The pronotum is shiny, but the elytra are dull and pruinose. The upper surface is reddish-brown and the underside is reddish-brown and shiny.
