= Astaena inflata =

Scientific classification
- Kingdom: Animalia
- Phylum: Arthropoda
- Class: Insecta
- Order: Coleoptera
- Suborder: Polyphaga
- Infraorder: Scarabaeiformia
- Family: Scarabaeidae
- Genus: Astaena
- Species: A. inflata

Binomial name
- Astaena inflata Lago, 2021

Species of beetle

Astaena inflata is a species of beetle of the family Scarabaeidae. It is found in Costa Rica.

== Description ==
Adults reach a length of about 8 mm. They are yellowish red, feebly shiny dorsally, with the outer elytral intervals and pronotal marginal grooves pruinose.

== Etymology ==
The species name is derived from Latin inflatus and refers to the swollen dorsum of the pronotum.
