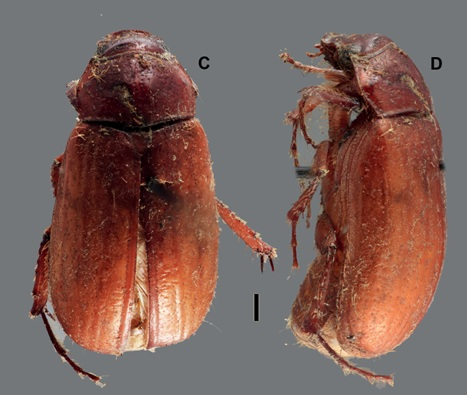

Scientific classification
- Kingdom: Animalia
- Phylum: Arthropoda
- Class: Insecta
- Order: Coleoptera
- Suborder: Polyphaga
- Infraorder: Scarabaeiformia
- Family: Scarabaeidae
- Genus: Astaena
- Species: A. abaca

Binomial name
- Astaena abaca Saylor, 1946

= Astaena abaca =

Species of beetle

Astaena abaca is a species of beetle of the family Scarabaeidae. It is found in Colombia.

== Description ==
Adults reach a length of about 12 mm. The head is reddish-brown with simple setae. There are also setae on the surface of the pronotum and elytra. Both the pronotum are elytra are unicolored reddish brown.
