= Astaena sparsesetosa =

Scientific classification
- Kingdom: Animalia
- Phylum: Arthropoda
- Class: Insecta
- Order: Coleoptera
- Suborder: Polyphaga
- Infraorder: Scarabaeiformia
- Family: Scarabaeidae
- Genus: Astaena
- Species: A. sparsesetosa

Binomial name
- Astaena sparsesetosa Frey, 1976

Species of beetle

Astaena sparsesetosa is a species of beetle of the family Scarabaeidae. It is found in Brazil (Bahia).

== Description ==
Adults reach a length of about 6.5–7 mm. The upper and lower surfaces are brown to light brown, with the head and underside faintly shiny, while the pronotum and elytra are dull and very sparsely and irregularly covered with long, erect, yellow setae. The antennae are light brown.
