= Astaena elongata =

Scientific classification
- Kingdom: Animalia
- Phylum: Arthropoda
- Class: Insecta
- Order: Coleoptera
- Suborder: Polyphaga
- Infraorder: Scarabaeiformia
- Family: Scarabaeidae
- Genus: Astaena
- Species: A. elongata

Binomial name
- Astaena elongata Burmeister, 1855

Species of beetle

Astaena elongata is a species of beetle of the family Scarabaeidae. It is found in Brazil (Bahia).

== Description ==
Adults reach a length of about 12 mm. The elytra are moderately densely covered with erect, long, coarser, very scattered hairs and with finer, shorter hairs.
