= Astaena divergens =

Scientific classification
- Kingdom: Animalia
- Phylum: Arthropoda
- Class: Insecta
- Order: Coleoptera
- Suborder: Polyphaga
- Infraorder: Scarabaeiformia
- Family: Scarabaeidae
- Genus: Astaena
- Species: A. divergens

Binomial name
- Astaena divergens Frey, 1973

Species of beetle

Astaena divergens is a species of beetle of the family Scarabaeidae. It is found in Brazil (Paraná).

== Description ==
Adults reach a length of about 11 mm. The pronotum is dull and the elytra are shiny. The head is shiny and dark brown. The back of the head is moderately coarsely and densely punctate. The pronotum is reddish, dull, tomentose and sparsely finely shallowly punctate. The elytra are shiny reddish-brown, with striae of punctures. The antennae are yellow.
