= Astaena acuticollis =

Scientific classification
- Kingdom: Animalia
- Phylum: Arthropoda
- Class: Insecta
- Order: Coleoptera
- Suborder: Polyphaga
- Infraorder: Scarabaeiformia
- Family: Scarabaeidae
- Genus: Astaena
- Species: A. acuticollis

Binomial name
- Astaena acuticollis Frey, 1973

Species of beetle

Astaena acuticollis is a species of beetle of the family Scarabaeidae. It is found in Colombia.

== Description ==
Adults reach a length of about 9–11 mm. The upper and lower surfaces are dark reddish-brown and shiny. The upper surface moderately densely coarsely punctate, the back of the head less densely and more finely punctate, sometimes smooth in the middle. The pronotum is sparsely and finely punctate and the sides partly even more finely punctate. The elytra have rather fine striae of punctures. The antennae are yellowish.
