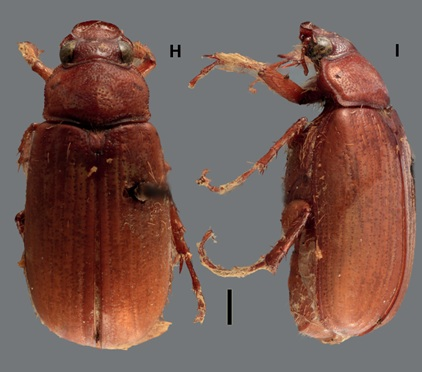

Scientific classification
- Kingdom: Animalia
- Phylum: Arthropoda
- Class: Insecta
- Order: Coleoptera
- Suborder: Polyphaga
- Infraorder: Scarabaeiformia
- Family: Scarabaeidae
- Genus: Astaena
- Species: A. explaniceps

Binomial name
- Astaena explaniceps Saylor, 1946

= Astaena explaniceps =

Species of beetle

Astaena explaniceps is a species of beetle of the family Scarabaeidae. It is found in Argentina.

Adults reach a length of about 9.2 mm. The head is reddish-brown with upright setae. The surface of the pronotum and elytra also has setae and both are unicolored reddish-brown.
