= Astaena crassitarsis =

Scientific classification
- Kingdom: Animalia
- Phylum: Arthropoda
- Class: Insecta
- Order: Coleoptera
- Suborder: Polyphaga
- Infraorder: Scarabaeiformia
- Family: Scarabaeidae
- Genus: Astaena
- Species: A. crassitarsis

Binomial name
- Astaena crassitarsis Frey, 1973

Species of beetle

Astaena crassitarsis is a species of beetle of the family Scarabaeidae. It is found in Brazil.

== Description ==
Adults reach a length of about 8 mm. The underside is light reddish-brown.
