= Astaena corumbana =

Scientific classification
- Kingdom: Animalia
- Phylum: Arthropoda
- Clade: Pancrustacea
- Class: Insecta
- Order: Coleoptera
- Suborder: Polyphaga
- Infraorder: Scarabaeiformia
- Family: Scarabaeidae
- Genus: Astaena
- Species: A. corumbana

Binomial name
- Astaena corumbana Moser, 1921

Species of beetle

Astaena corumbana is a species of beetle of the family Scarabaeidae. It is found in Brazil (Mato Grosso do Sul).

== Description ==
Adults reach a length of about 7 mm. The pronotum is densely and rather finely punctate. The dorsal surface has an opalescent sheen in males, while it is simply shiny in females.
