= Astaena alternata =

Scientific classification
- Kingdom: Animalia
- Phylum: Arthropoda
- Class: Insecta
- Order: Coleoptera
- Suborder: Polyphaga
- Infraorder: Scarabaeiformia
- Family: Scarabaeidae
- Genus: Astaena
- Species: A. alternata

Binomial name
- Astaena alternata Lago, 2021

Species of beetle

Astaena alternata is a species of beetle of the family Scarabaeidae. It is found in Panama.

== Description ==
Adults reach a length of about 8.75–9 mm. They are reddish brown. The head, legs and abdomen are shiny, while the pronotum, elytra, pygidium and venter of the thorax are opaque, weakly pruinose and opalescent.

== Etymology ==
The name of the species refers to the higher and lower intervals across the disc of the elytra.
