= Astaena pectoralis =

Scientific classification
- Kingdom: Animalia
- Phylum: Arthropoda
- Clade: Pancrustacea
- Class: Insecta
- Order: Coleoptera
- Suborder: Polyphaga
- Infraorder: Scarabaeiformia
- Family: Scarabaeidae
- Genus: Astaena
- Species: A. pectoralis

Binomial name
- Astaena pectoralis Moser, 1918

Species of beetle

Astaena pectoralis is a species of beetle of the family Scarabaeidae. It is found in Brazil (Minas Gerais).

== Description ==
Adults reach a length of about 9–10 mm. The upper and lower surfaces are reddish-brown and shiny. The pronotum is moderately densely punctate and the elytra have striae of punctures. The antennae are yellow.
