= Astaena cuyabana =

Scientific classification
- Kingdom: Animalia
- Phylum: Arthropoda
- Clade: Pancrustacea
- Class: Insecta
- Order: Coleoptera
- Suborder: Polyphaga
- Infraorder: Scarabaeiformia
- Family: Scarabaeidae
- Genus: Astaena
- Species: A. cuyabana

Binomial name
- Astaena cuyabana Moser, 1918

Synonyms
- Astaena rufobrunnea Moser, 1921

Species of beetle

Astaena cuyabana is a species of beetle of the family Scarabaeidae. It is found in Brazil (Mato Grosso) and Paraguay.

== Description ==
Adults reach a length of about 7–8 mm. They are reddish-brown and dull, with a more or less silky sheen. The head and abdomen are shiny.
