= Astaena ciliata =

Scientific classification
- Kingdom: Animalia
- Phylum: Arthropoda
- Class: Insecta
- Order: Coleoptera
- Suborder: Polyphaga
- Infraorder: Scarabaeiformia
- Family: Scarabaeidae
- Genus: Astaena
- Species: A. ciliata

Binomial name
- Astaena ciliata Lago, 2021

Species of beetle

Astaena ciliata is a species of beetle of the family Scarabaeidae. It is found in Panama.

== Description ==
Adults reach a length of about 7.5–8 mm. They are dark reddish brown, weakly shiny and opalescent, with sericeous reflections. The head, legs and abdomen are shiny.

== Etymology ==
The name of the species refers to the diagnostic characteristic of a contiguous fringe of broad setae along the posterior margin of the metacoxal plates.
