= Astaena excisicollis =

Scientific classification
- Kingdom: Animalia
- Phylum: Arthropoda
- Class: Insecta
- Order: Coleoptera
- Suborder: Polyphaga
- Infraorder: Scarabaeiformia
- Family: Scarabaeidae
- Genus: Astaena
- Species: A. excisicollis

Binomial name
- Astaena excisicollis Frey, 1973

Species of beetle

Astaena excisicollis is a species of beetle of the family Scarabaeidae. It is found in Ecuador.

== Description ==
Adults reach a length of about 7–8 mm. The pronotum has erect, fine pubescence. The head, pronotum, scutellum, and a broad, posteriorly narrowed stripe on the elytra are all dark brown, while the underside, antennae, pygidium, and remainder of the elytra are light brown. The upperside is strongly shiny.
