= Astaena corrugata =

Scientific classification
- Kingdom: Animalia
- Phylum: Arthropoda
- Class: Insecta
- Order: Coleoptera
- Suborder: Polyphaga
- Infraorder: Scarabaeiformia
- Family: Scarabaeidae
- Genus: Astaena
- Species: A. corrugata

Binomial name
- Astaena corrugata Lago, 2021

Species of beetle

Astaena corrugata is a species of beetle of the family Scarabaeidae. It is found in Costa Rica.

== Description ==
Adults reach a length of about 7–8 mm. The head is piceous and shiny, while the pronotum and elytra are opaque, velvety and greyish black. The legs are dark reddish brown.

== Etymology ==
The name of the species is derived from Latin corrugata (meaning wrinkled) and refers to the transverse ridges on the elytra.
