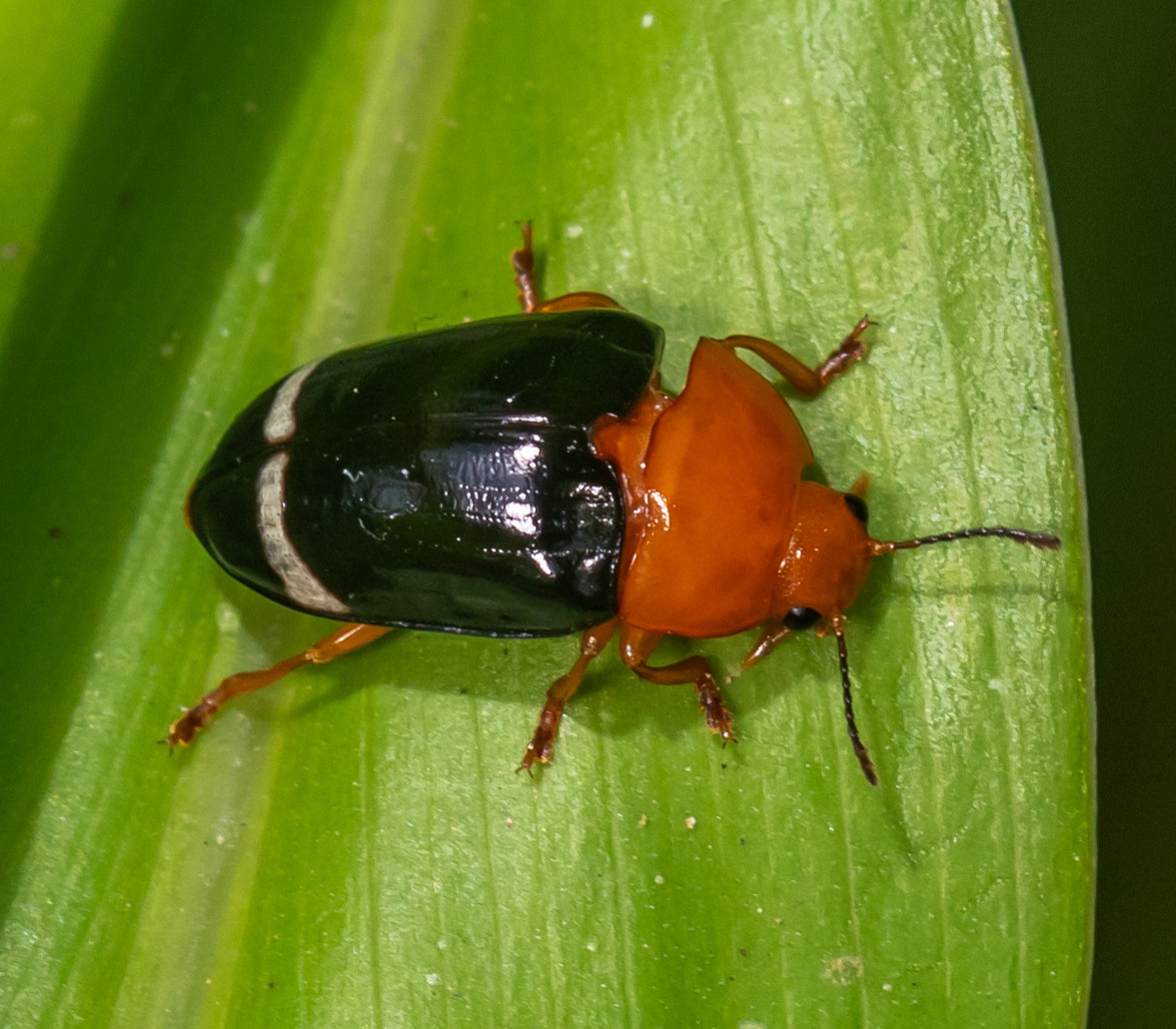
- M. mycetophagoides in Peru

Scientific classification
- Kingdom: Animalia
- Phylum: Arthropoda
- Clade: Pancrustacea
- Class: Insecta
- Order: Coleoptera
- Suborder: Polyphaga
- Infraorder: Cucujiformia
- Family: Erotylidae
- Genus: Mycotretus
- Species: M. mycetophagoides

Binomial name
- Mycotretus mycetophagoides Crotch, 1876

= Mycotretus mycetophagoides =

Species of beetle

Mycotretus mycetophagoides is a species of beetle of the Erotylidae family. This species is found in northern Brazil.

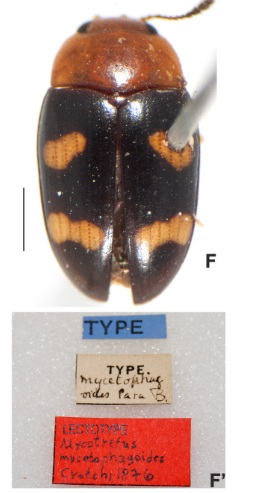
M. m. mycetophagoides

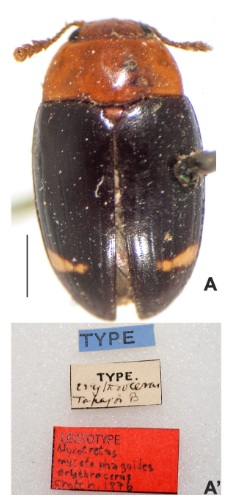
M. m. erythrocerus

== Subspecies ==
- Mycotretus mycetophagoides mycetophagoides (northern Brazil)
- Mycotretus mycetophagoides erythrocerus Crotch, 1876 (northern Brazil)
