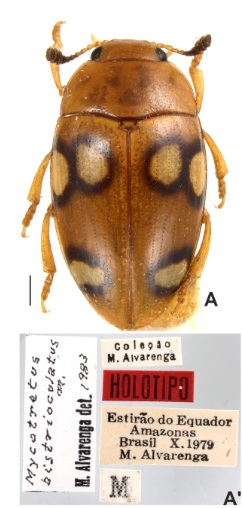

Scientific classification
- Kingdom: Animalia
- Phylum: Arthropoda
- Class: Insecta
- Order: Coleoptera
- Suborder: Polyphaga
- Infraorder: Cucujiformia
- Family: Erotylidae
- Genus: Mycotretus
- Species: M. bistrioculatus

Binomial name
- Mycotretus bistrioculatus Alvarenga, 1983

= Mycotretus bistrioculatus =

Species of beetle

Mycotretus bistrioculatus is a species of beetle of the Erotylidae family. This species is found in northern Brazil.

This species is similar to Mycotretus argus, Mycotretus sexoculatus chaparensis and Mycotretus pulchellus in body shape and arrangement of the circular elytral spots.
