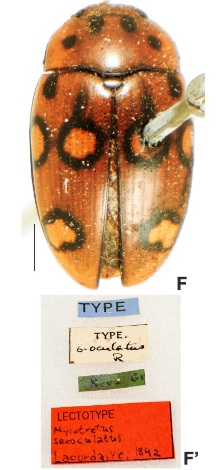
- Mycotretus sexoculatus sexoculatus
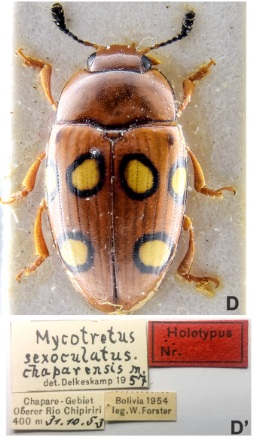
- Mycotretus sexoculatus chaparensis

Scientific classification
- Kingdom: Animalia
- Phylum: Arthropoda
- Clade: Pancrustacea
- Class: Insecta
- Order: Coleoptera
- Suborder: Polyphaga
- Infraorder: Cucujiformia
- Family: Erotylidae
- Genus: Mycotretus
- Species: M. sexoculatus

Binomial name
- Mycotretus sexoculatus Lacordaire, 1842

= Mycotretus sexoculatus =

Species of beetle

Mycotretus sexoculatus is a species of beetle of the Erotylidae family. This species is found in Colombia, southeastern Brazil and Bolivia.

== Subspecies ==
- Mycotretus sexoculatus sexoculatus (Colombia, southeastern Brazil)
- Mycotretus sexoculatus chaparensis Delkeskamp, 1957 (Bolivia)
