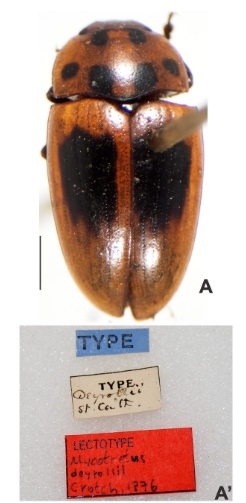

Scientific classification
- Kingdom: Animalia
- Phylum: Arthropoda
- Clade: Pancrustacea
- Class: Insecta
- Order: Coleoptera
- Suborder: Polyphaga
- Infraorder: Cucujiformia
- Family: Erotylidae
- Genus: Mycotretus
- Species: M. deyrollei

Binomial name
- Mycotretus deyrollei Crotch, 1876

Synonyms
- Mycotretus discipennis Kuhnt, 1910; Mycotretus discipennis conductus Kuhnt, 1910; Mycotretus sexlineatus Kuhnt, 1910

= Mycotretus deyrollei =

Species of beetle

Mycotretus deyrollei is a species of beetle of the Erotylidae family. This species is found in southern Brazil.
