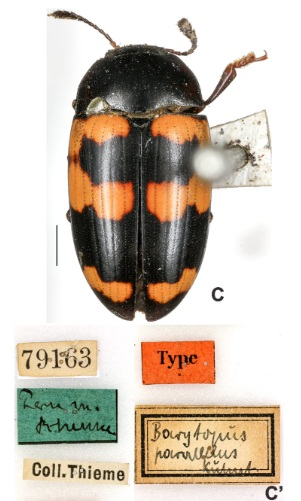

Scientific classification
- Kingdom: Animalia
- Phylum: Arthropoda
- Clade: Pancrustacea
- Class: Insecta
- Order: Coleoptera
- Suborder: Polyphaga
- Infraorder: Cucujiformia
- Family: Erotylidae
- Genus: Mycotretus
- Species: M. fidelis

Binomial name
- Mycotretus fidelis Delkeskamp, 1939

Synonyms
- Brachysphaenus (Barytopus) parallelus Kuhnt, 1909

= Mycotretus fidelis =

Species of beetle

Mycotretus fidelis is a species of beetle of the Erotylidae family. This species is found in Peru.
