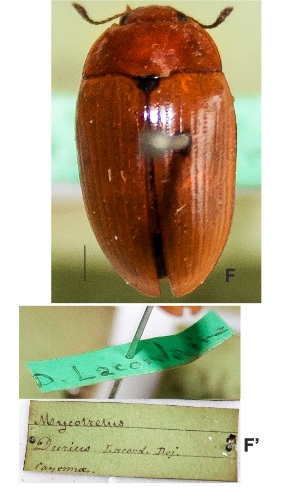

Scientific classification
- Kingdom: Animalia
- Phylum: Arthropoda
- Class: Insecta
- Order: Coleoptera
- Suborder: Polyphaga
- Infraorder: Cucujiformia
- Family: Erotylidae
- Genus: Mycotretus
- Species: M. durius

Binomial name
- Mycotretus durius Lacordaire, 1842

= Mycotretus durius =

Species of beetle

Mycotretus durius is a species of beetle of the Erotylidae family. This species is found in French Guiana and northern Brazil.
