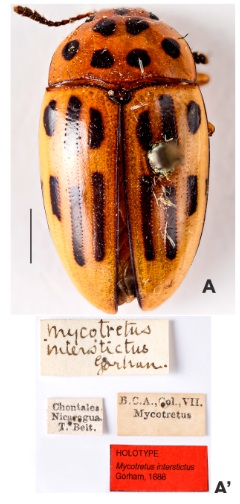

Scientific classification
- Kingdom: Animalia
- Phylum: Arthropoda
- Class: Insecta
- Order: Coleoptera
- Suborder: Polyphaga
- Infraorder: Cucujiformia
- Family: Erotylidae
- Genus: Mycotretus
- Species: M. interstictus

Binomial name
- Mycotretus interstictus Gorham, 1888

Synonyms
- Mycotretus interstitialis Kuhnt, 1910

= Mycotretus interstictus =

Species of beetle

Mycotretus interstictus is a species of beetle of the Erotylidae family. This species is found in Nicaragua and Panama.
