= Mycotretus jocosus =

Scientific classification
- Kingdom: Animalia
- Phylum: Arthropoda
- Clade: Pancrustacea
- Class: Insecta
- Order: Coleoptera
- Suborder: Polyphaga
- Infraorder: Cucujiformia
- Family: Erotylidae
- Genus: Mycotretus
- Species: M. jocosus

Binomial name
- Mycotretus jocosus Lacordaire, 1842

Species of beetle

Mycotretus jocosus is a species of beetle in the family Erotylidae. It is found in south-eastern Brazil.
