= List of pollen beetles (Nitidulidae) recorded in Great Britain =

This is a list of the pollen beetles (family Nitidulidae) recorded in Great Britain. For other beetles, see List of beetle species recorded in Britain.

- Urophorus humeralis (Fabricius, 1798)
- Carpophilus dimidiatus (Fabricius, 1792)
- Carpophilus flavipes Murray, 1864
- Carpophilus hemipterus (Linnaeus, 1758)
- Carpophilus ligneus Murray, 1864
- Carpophilus maculatus Murray, 1864
- Carpophilus marginellus Motschulsky, 1858
- Carpophilus mutilatus Erichson, 1843
- Carpophilus nepos Murray, 1864
- Carpophilus obsoletus Erichson, 1843
- Carpophilus sexpustulatus (Fabricius, 1792)
- Carpophilus truncatus Murray, 1864
- Epuraea aestiva (Linnaeus, 1758)
- Epuraea angustula Sturm, 1844
- Epuraea biguttata (Thunberg, 1784)
- Epuraea binotata Reitter, 1872
- Epuraea distincta (Grimmer, 1841)
- Epuraea fuscicollis (Stephens, 1835)
- Epuraea guttata (Olivier, 1811)
- Epuraea longula Erichson, 1845
- Epuraea marseuli Reitter, 1872
- Epuraea melina Erichson, 1843
- Epuraea neglecta (Heer, 1841)
- Epuraea pallescens (Stephens, 1835)
- Epuraea rufomarginata (Stephens, 1830)
- Epuraea silacea (Herbst, 1783)
- Epuraea terminalis (Mannerheim, 1843)
- Epuraea thoracica Tournier, 1872
- Epuraea variegata (Herbst, 1793)
- Epuraea limbata (Fabricius, 1787)
- Micrurula melanocephala (Marsham, 1802)
- Pria dulcamarae (Scopoli, 1763)
- Meligethes aeneus (Fabricius, 1775)
- Meligethes atramentarius Förster, 1849
- Meligethes atratus (Olivier, 1790)
- Meligethes bidens Brisout de Barneville, 1863
- Meligethes bidentatus Brisout de Barneville, 1863
- Meligethes brevis Sturm, 1845
- Meligethes brunnicornis Sturm, 1845
- Meligethes carinulatus Förster, 1849
- Meligethes coracinus Sturm, 1845
- Meligethes corvinus Erichson, 1845
- Meligethes difficilis (Heer, 1841)
- Meligethes erichsonii Brisout de Barneville, 1863
- Meligethes exilis Sturm, 1845
- Meligethes flavimanus Stephens, 1830
- Meligethes fulvipes Brisout de Barneville, 1863
- Meligethes gagathinus Erichson, 1845
- Meligethes haemorrhoidalis Förster, 1849
- Meligethes incanus Sturm, 1845
- Meligethes kunzei Erichson, 1845
- Meligethes lugubris Sturm, 1845
- Meligethes morosus Erichson, 1845
- Meligethes nanus Erichson, 1845
- Meligethes nigrescens Stephens, 1830
- Meligethes obscurus Erichson, 1845
- Meligethes ochropus Sturm, 1845
- Meligethes ovatus Sturm, 1845
- Meligethes pedicularius (Gyllenhal, 1808)
- Meligethes persicus (Faldermann, 1835)
- Meligethes planiusculus (Heer, 1841)
- Meligethes rotundicollis Brisout de Barneville, 1863
- Meligethes ruficornis (Marsham, 1802)
- Meligethes serripes (Gyllenhal, 1827)
- Meligethes solidus (Kugelann, 1794)
- Meligethes subrugosus (Gyllenhal, 1808)
- Meligethes umbrosus Sturm, 1845
- Meligethes viridescens (Fabricius, 1787)
- Nitidula bipunctata (Linnaeus, 1758)
- Nitidula carnaria (Schaller, 1783)
- Nitidula flavomaculata Rossi, 1790
- Nitidula rufipes (Linnaeus, 1767)
- Omosita colon (Linnaeus, 1758)
- Omosita depressa (Linnaeus, 1758)
- Omosita discoidea (Fabricius, 1775)
- Soronia grisea (Linnaeus, 1758)
- Soronia punctatissima (Illiger, 1794)
- Amphotis marginata (Fabricius, 1781)
- Cychramus luteus (Fabricius, 1787)
- Pocadius adustus Reitter, 1888
- Pocadius ferrugineus (Fabricius, 1775)
- Thalycra fervida (Olivier, 1790)
- Cryptarcha strigata (Fabricius, 1787)
- Cryptarcha undata (Olivier, 1790)
- Glischrochilus quadripunctatus (Linnaeus, 1758)
- Glischrochilus hortensis (Geoffroy in Fourcroy, 1785)
- Glischrochilus quadriguttatus (Fabricius, 1777)
- Pityophagus ferrugineus (Linnaeus, 1761)
- Cybocephalus fodori Endrödy-Younga, 1965
