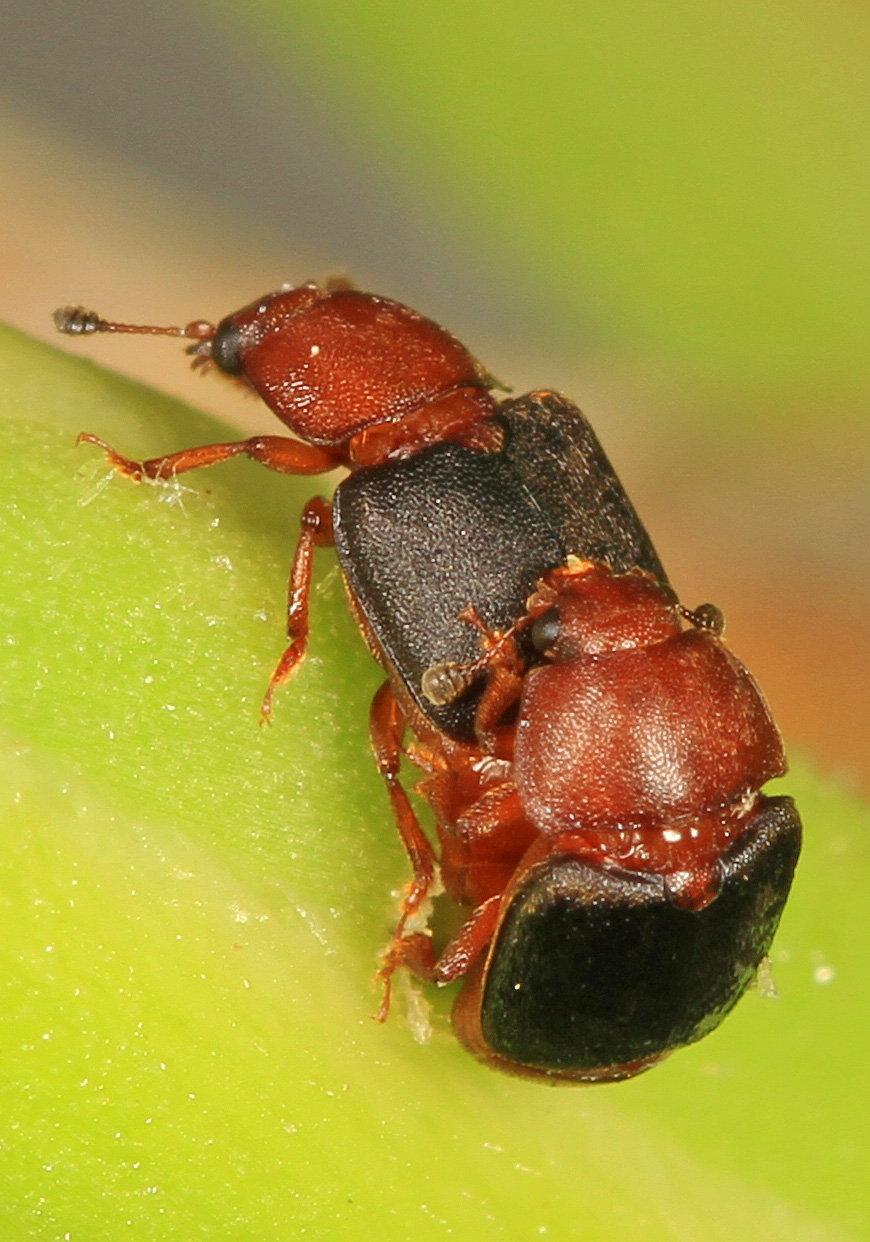
- Carpophilus marginellus

Scientific classification
- Domain: Eukaryota
- Kingdom: Animalia
- Phylum: Arthropoda
- Class: Insecta
- Order: Coleoptera
- Suborder: Polyphaga
- Infraorder: Cucujiformia
- Family: Nitidulidae
- Subfamily: Carpophilinae
- Genus: Carpophilus; Stephens, 1830

= Carpophilus =

Genus of beetles

Carpophilus is a genus of sap beetles. Several species are agricultural pests, typically causing feeding damage to a variety of fruits, grains and other food products worldwide. The genus contains a great number of species.

== Description ==
Adult Carpophilus are oblong-shaped beetles roughly 3 mm in length and black, brown or mottled yellow in colour. The elytra are short, exposing the last two abdominal tergites. The antennae are clubbed.

Larval Carpophilus are yellowish with a brown head and a pair of urogomphi (giving the appearance of a forked tail). They are about 5 mm long when fully grown.

== Life cycle ==
Adult Carpophilus are active in spring and summer. They can fly several kilometres in search of host fruit.

When this is discovered, the females lay eggs in fruit on the tree (in the case of stone fruit) or in fallen fruit on the ground (in the case of citrus, apples and figs). They may also lay in stored products such as dried fruit.

Larvae feed and grow within the fruit. When mature, larvae leave the fruit to pupate in the ground. Larvae that infest stored products also pupate in them.

There are several generations a year. Development from egg to adult takes approximately one month in summer. It is temperature-dependent, taking about 12 days at warm temperatures (32.2 °C) and up to 42 days at cooler temperatures (18.3 °C). Humidity also affects the life cycle, with faster development (and also more eggs laid) at higher humidity. Carpophilus can overwinter in the mature larva, pupa or adult stages, and does so in fruit, stored products, soil or in cracks or under bark of trees.

== Pest status ==
Several species of Carpophilus are pests of various fruits (including stone fruit, citrus, persimmons, apples and figs) and stored products (including corn, cornmeal, bread, wheat, oats, rice, sugar, beans, peanuts, nuts, cottonseed, copra, spices, drugs, and honey). They damage fruit directly with their feeding and also indirectly by spreading diseases (e.g. brown rot).

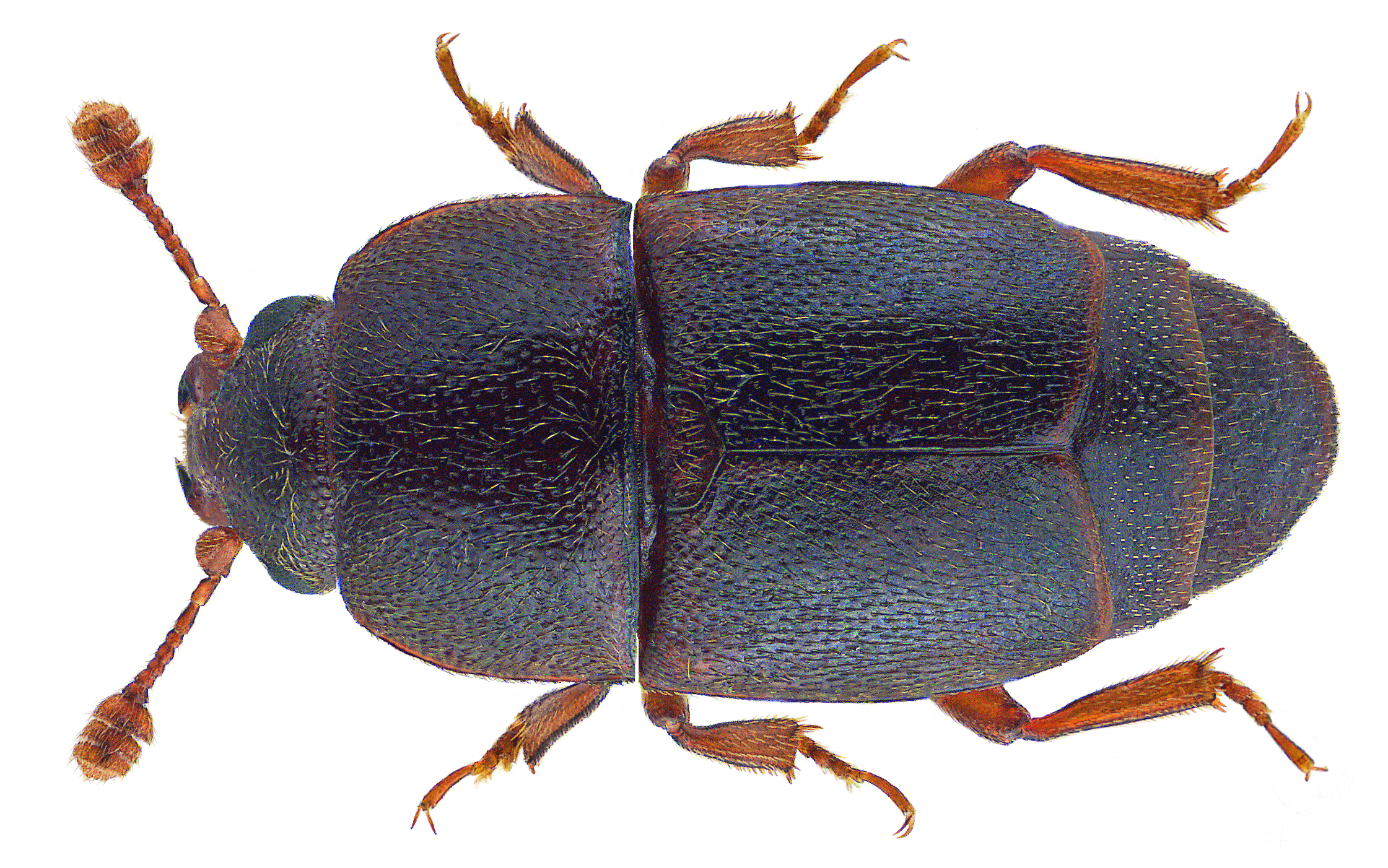
Carpophilus melanopterus

One species, Carpophilus truncatus, has been especially fast-spreading and damaging numerous crops on several continents.

== Selected species ==
- Carpophilus antiquus Melsheimer, 1844
- Carpophilus brachypterus (Say, 1825)
- Carpophilus brevipennis (Blanchard, 1842)
- Carpophilus californicus Schaeffer, 1911
- Carpophilus corticinus Erichson, 1843
- Carpophilus craigheadi Dobson, 1972
- Carpophilus deflexus Sharp, 1889
- Carpophilus dimidiatus (Fabricius, 1792) (cornsap beetle)
- Carpophilus discoideus LeConte, 1858
- Carpophilus floralis Erichson, 1843
- Carpophilus freemani Dobson, 1956 (Freeman's sap beetle)
- Carpophilus fumatus Boheman, 1851
- Carpophilus funebris Sharp, 1889
- Carpophilus hemipterus (Linnaeus, 1758) (dried-fruit beetle)
- Carpophilus ligneus Murray, 1864
- Carpophilus longiventris Sharp, 1889
- Carpophilus longus Fall, 1910
- Carpophilus lugubris Murray, 1864 (dusky sap beetle)
- Carpophilus maculatus Murray, 1864
- Carpophilus marginatus Erichson, 1843
- Carpophilus marginellus Motschulsky, 1858
- Carpophilus melanopterus Erichson, 1843
- Carpophilus mutilatus Erichson, 1843 (confused sap beetle)
- Carpophilus niger (Say, 1823)
- Carpophilus nigrovittatus Parsons, 1943
- Carpophilus obsoletus Erichson, 1843
- Carpophilus oculatus Murray, 1864
- Carpophilus pallipennis (Say, 1823)
- Carpophilus rufiventris Schaeffer, 1911
- Carpophilus rufus Murray, 1864
- Carpophilus sayi Parsons, 1943
- Carpophilus tempestivus Erichson, 1843
- Carpophilus truncatus Murray, 1864
- Carpophilus yuccae (Crotch, 1874)
- Carpophilus zuni Casey, 1884

== See also ==
- Urophorus humeralis (Fabricius, 1798); formerly placed in the genus Carpophilus, this species can be differentiated by having three abdominal tergites rather than two.
