= Carpophilus antiquus =

Scientific classification
- Kingdom: Animalia
- Phylum: Arthropoda
- Class: Insecta
- Order: Coleoptera
- Suborder: Polyphaga
- Infraorder: Cucujiformia
- Family: Nitidulidae
- Genus: Carpophilus
- Species: C. antiquus

Binomial name
- Carpophilus antiquus Melsheimer, 1844

Synonyms
- Carpophilus punctulatus (Melsheimer, 1844)

Species of beetle

Carpophilus antiquus is a species of sap-feeding beetle in the family Nitidulidae. It is found in North America.

Carpophilus antiquus can synthesize a novel pheromone while feeding on wheat, yeast, or corn that attracts the same and sympatric species and lead to a beetle infestation.
