= Carpophilus freemani =

- Top-down view of the Carpophilus freemani

Scientific classification
- Kingdom: Animalia
- Phylum: Arthropoda
- Clade: Pancrustacea
- Class: Insecta
- Order: Coleoptera
- Suborder: Polyphaga
- Infraorder: Cucujiformia
- Family: Nitidulidae
- Genus: Carpophilus
- Species: C. freemani

Binomial name
- Carpophilus freemani Dobson, 1956

Species of beetle

Carpophilus freemani, or Freeman's sap beetle, is a species of sap-feeding beetle in the family Nitidulidae. It is found in North America, Oceania, and Europe.
