= Carpophilus sayi =

Scientific classification
- Domain: Eukaryota
- Kingdom: Animalia
- Phylum: Arthropoda
- Class: Insecta
- Order: Coleoptera
- Suborder: Polyphaga
- Infraorder: Cucujiformia
- Family: Nitidulidae
- Genus: Carpophilus
- Species: C. sayi

Binomial name
- Carpophilus sayi Parsons, 1943

Species of beetle

Carpophilus sayi is a species of sap-feeding beetle in the family Nitidulidae. It is found in North America, and named after Thomas Say.
