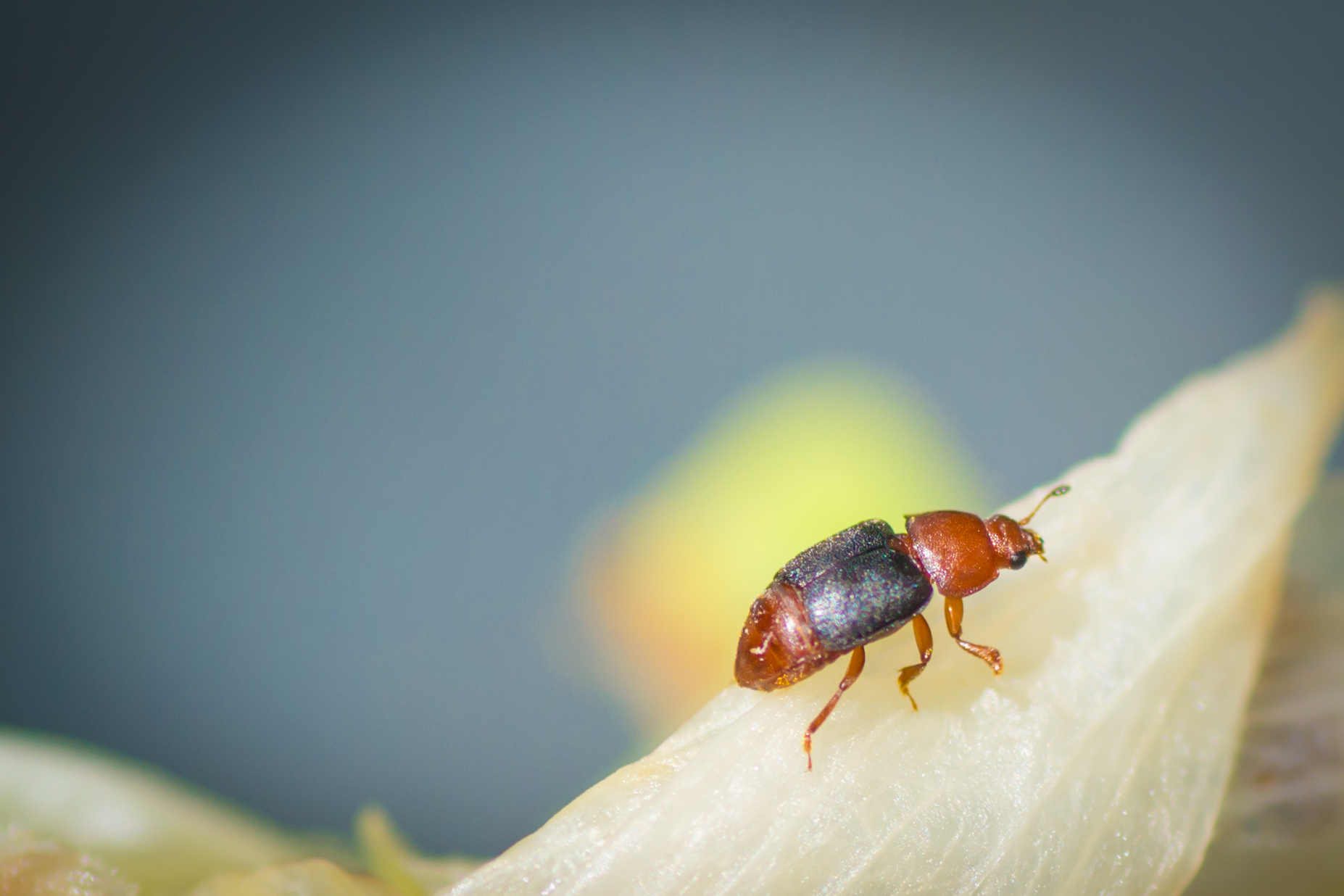

Scientific classification
- Kingdom: Animalia
- Phylum: Arthropoda
- Class: Insecta
- Order: Coleoptera
- Suborder: Polyphaga
- Infraorder: Cucujiformia
- Family: Nitidulidae
- Genus: Carpophilus
- Species: C. melanopterus

Binomial name
- Carpophilus melanopterus Erichson, 1843

= Carpophilus melanopterus =

Species of beetle

Carpophilus melanopterus is a species of sap-feeding beetles in the family Nitidulidae. It is found in Central America and North America.

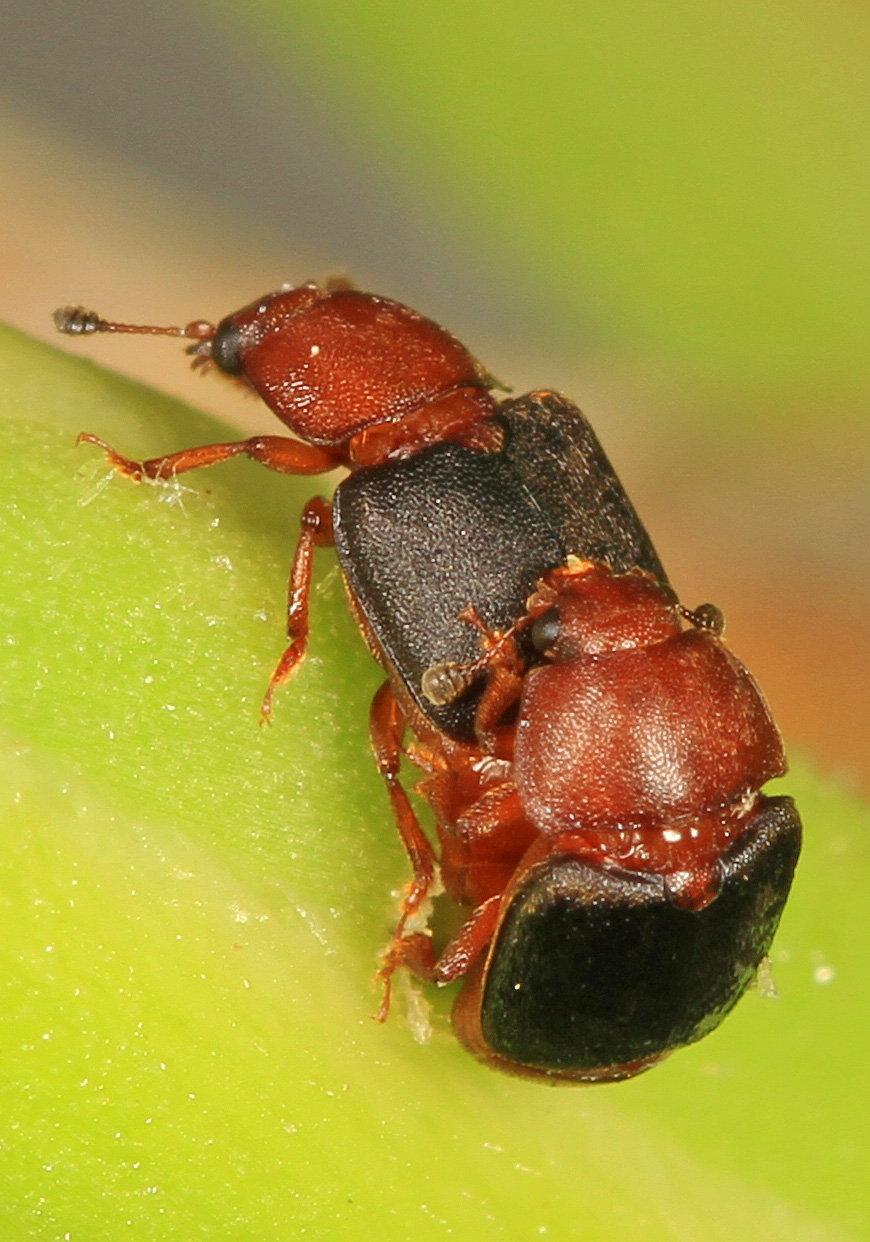
