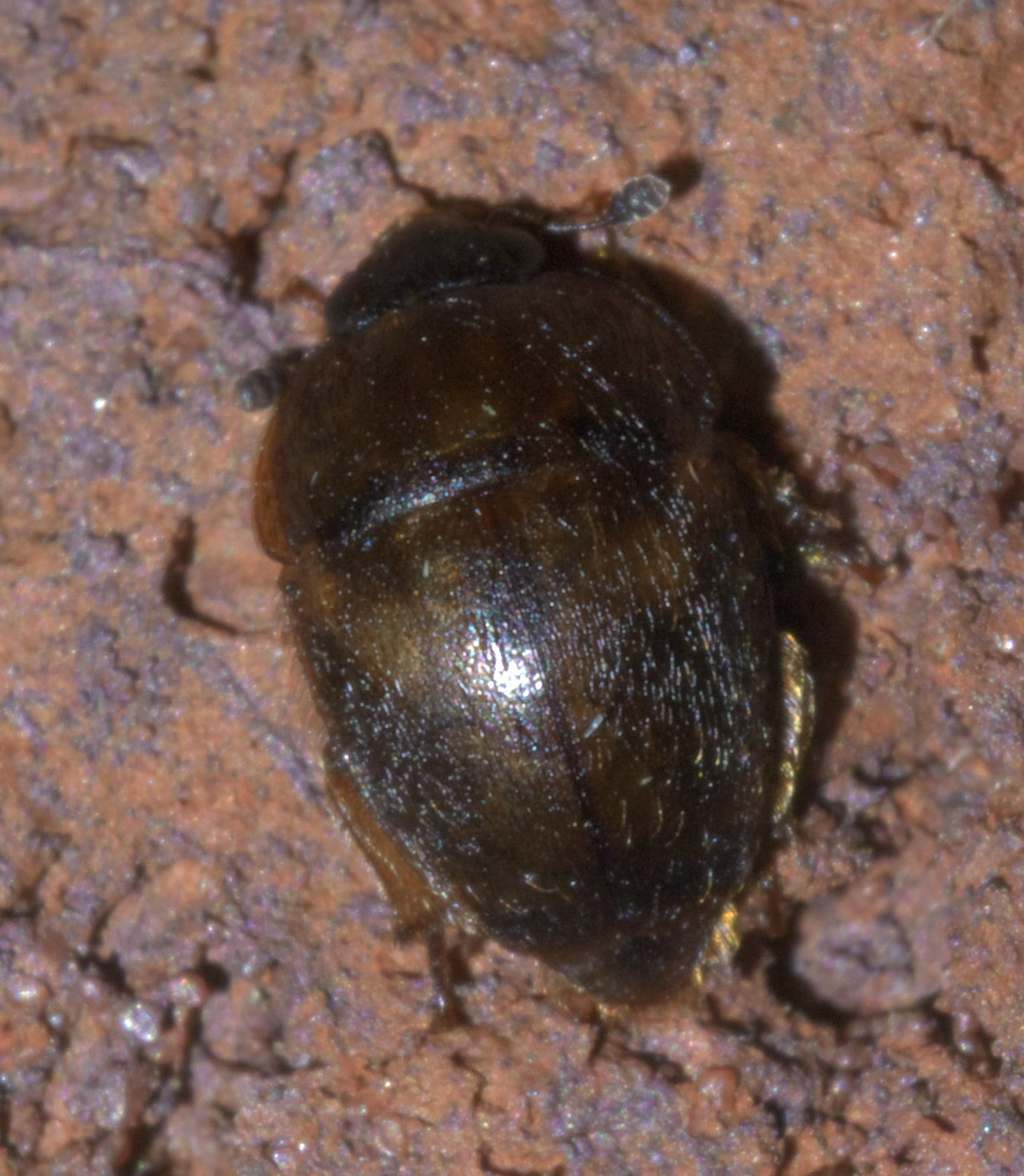

Scientific classification
- Domain: Eukaryota
- Kingdom: Animalia
- Phylum: Arthropoda
- Class: Insecta
- Order: Coleoptera
- Suborder: Polyphaga
- Infraorder: Cucujiformia
- Family: Nitidulidae
- Genus: Amphicrossus
- Species: A. ciliatus

Binomial name
- Amphicrossus ciliatus (Olivier, 1811)

Synonyms
- Amphicrossus unilineatus (Say, 1825)

= Amphicrossus ciliatus =

Species of beetle

Amphicrossus ciliatus is a species of sap-feeding beetle in the family Nitidulidae. It is found in the Caribbean Sea, Central America, and North America.

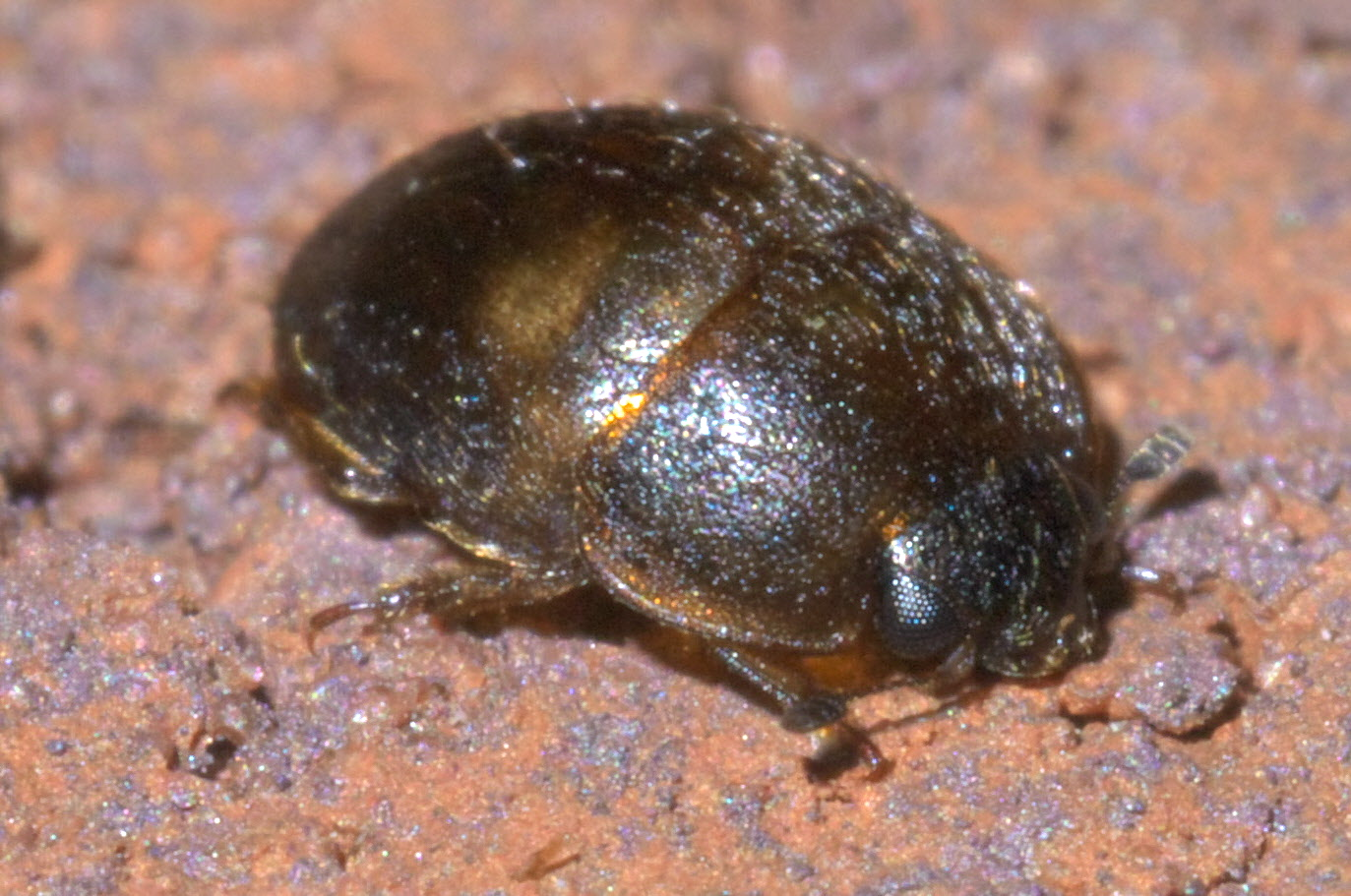
