= Caplothorax =

Scientific classification
- Kingdom: Animalia
- Phylum: Arthropoda
- Clade: Pancrustacea
- Class: Insecta
- Order: Coleoptera
- Suborder: Polyphaga
- Infraorder: Cucujiformia
- Family: Nitidulidae
- Subfamily: Carpophilinae
- Genus: Caplothorax

Type species
- Carpophilus melanopterus Erichson, 1843

Genus of beetles

Caplothorax is a genus of sap beetles.

== Species ==
There are 11 species in the genus Caplothorax:

- Caplothorax brevipennis (Blanchard, 1842)
- Caplothorax californicus (Schaeffer, 1911)
- Caplothorax funebris (Sharp, 1889)
- Caplothorax lugubris (Murray, 1864)
- Caplothorax melanopterus (Erichson, 1843)
- Caplothorax rufiventris (Schaeffer, 1911)
- Caplothorax rufus (Murray, 1864)
- Caplothorax sayi (Parsons, 1943)
- Caplothorax similaris (Sharp, 1889)
- Caplothorax viduatus (Sharp, 1889)
- Caplothorax yuccae (Crotch, 1874)
