= Stelidota octomaculata =

Scientific classification
- Domain: Eukaryota
- Kingdom: Animalia
- Phylum: Arthropoda
- Class: Insecta
- Order: Coleoptera
- Suborder: Polyphaga
- Infraorder: Cucujiformia
- Family: Nitidulidae
- Genus: Stelidota
- Species: S. octomaculata

Binomial name
- Stelidota octomaculata (Say, 1825)

Synonyms
- Stelidota biseriata Reitter, 1874

Species of beetle

Stelidota octomaculata is a species of sap-feeding beetle in the family Nitidulidae. It is endemic to North America.
