= Carpophilus tempestivus =

Scientific classification
- Kingdom: Animalia
- Phylum: Arthropoda
- Class: Insecta
- Order: Coleoptera
- Suborder: Polyphaga
- Infraorder: Cucujiformia
- Family: Nitidulidae
- Genus: Carpophilus
- Species: C. tempestivus

Binomial name
- Carpophilus tempestivus Erichson, 1843

Synonyms
- Carpophilus terminatus Murray, 1864

Species of beetle

Carpophilus tempestivus is a species of sap-feeding beetle in the family Nitidulidae. It is found in the Caribbean Sea and North America.
