= Carpophilus yuccae =

Scientific classification
- Domain: Eukaryota
- Kingdom: Animalia
- Phylum: Arthropoda
- Class: Insecta
- Order: Coleoptera
- Suborder: Polyphaga
- Infraorder: Cucujiformia
- Family: Nitidulidae
- Genus: Carpophilus
- Species: C. yuccae

Binomial name
- Carpophilus yuccae (Crotch, 1874)

Species of beetle

Carpophilus yuccae is a species of sap-feeding beetle in the family Nitidulidae. It is found in North America.
