= Prometopia =

Scientific classification
- Kingdom: Animalia
- Phylum: Arthropoda
- Class: Insecta
- Order: Coleoptera
- Suborder: Polyphaga
- Infraorder: Cucujiformia
- Family: Nitidulidae
- Subfamily: Prometopinae
- Genus: Prometopia; Erichson, 1843

Genus of beetles

Prometopia is a genus of sap-feeding beetles in the family Nitidulidae. There are about five described species in Prometopia.

== Species ==
These five species belong to the genus Prometopia:

- Prometopia bidentata Schaeffer, 1909
- Prometopia depilis Scudder, 1877
- Prometopia quadrimaculata Motschulsky, 1863
- Prometopia sexmaculata (Say, 1825)
- Prometopia unidentata Hisamatsu, 1959
