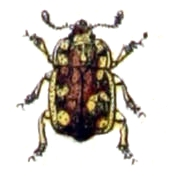

Scientific classification
- Kingdom: Animalia
- Phylum: Arthropoda
- Clade: Pancrustacea
- Class: Insecta
- Order: Coleoptera
- Suborder: Polyphaga
- Infraorder: Cucujiformia
- Family: Nitidulidae
- Genus: Epuraea
- Species: E. guttata

Binomial name
- Epuraea guttata (Olivier, 1790)

= Epuraea guttata =

Species of beetle

Epuraea guttata is a species of sap beetle of the subfamily Carpophilinae.

== Description ==
=== Adult ===
Body length of an adult is 2.6–4.4 millimetres (0.10–0.17 in). The pronotum, mesonotum, and metanotum are strongly shiny. The head and legs have a moderate shine, as do the elytra. The abdomen is matte.

=== Pupa ===
The body length of pupae ranges from 3.1–3.65 millimetres (0.122–0.144 in), and their width between 1.45–1.7 millimetres (0.057–0.067 in). Pupae range in color from whitish to cream, except for the longitudinal tubercles, which are light brown in color.

== Ecology ==
The beetles live in groves that include the English oak. They can be found under the bark, feeding on the sap of deciduous trees. They are occasionally found in association with the larvae of stem-boring moths of genus Cossus.
