= Carpophilus marginatus =

Scientific classification
- Kingdom: Animalia
- Phylum: Arthropoda
- Class: Insecta
- Order: Coleoptera
- Suborder: Polyphaga
- Infraorder: Cucujiformia
- Family: Nitidulidae
- Genus: Carpophilus
- Species: C. marginatus

Binomial name
- Carpophilus marginatus Erichson, 1843

Species of beetle

Carpophilus marginatus is a species of sap-feeding beetle in the family Nitidulidae. It is found in North America.
