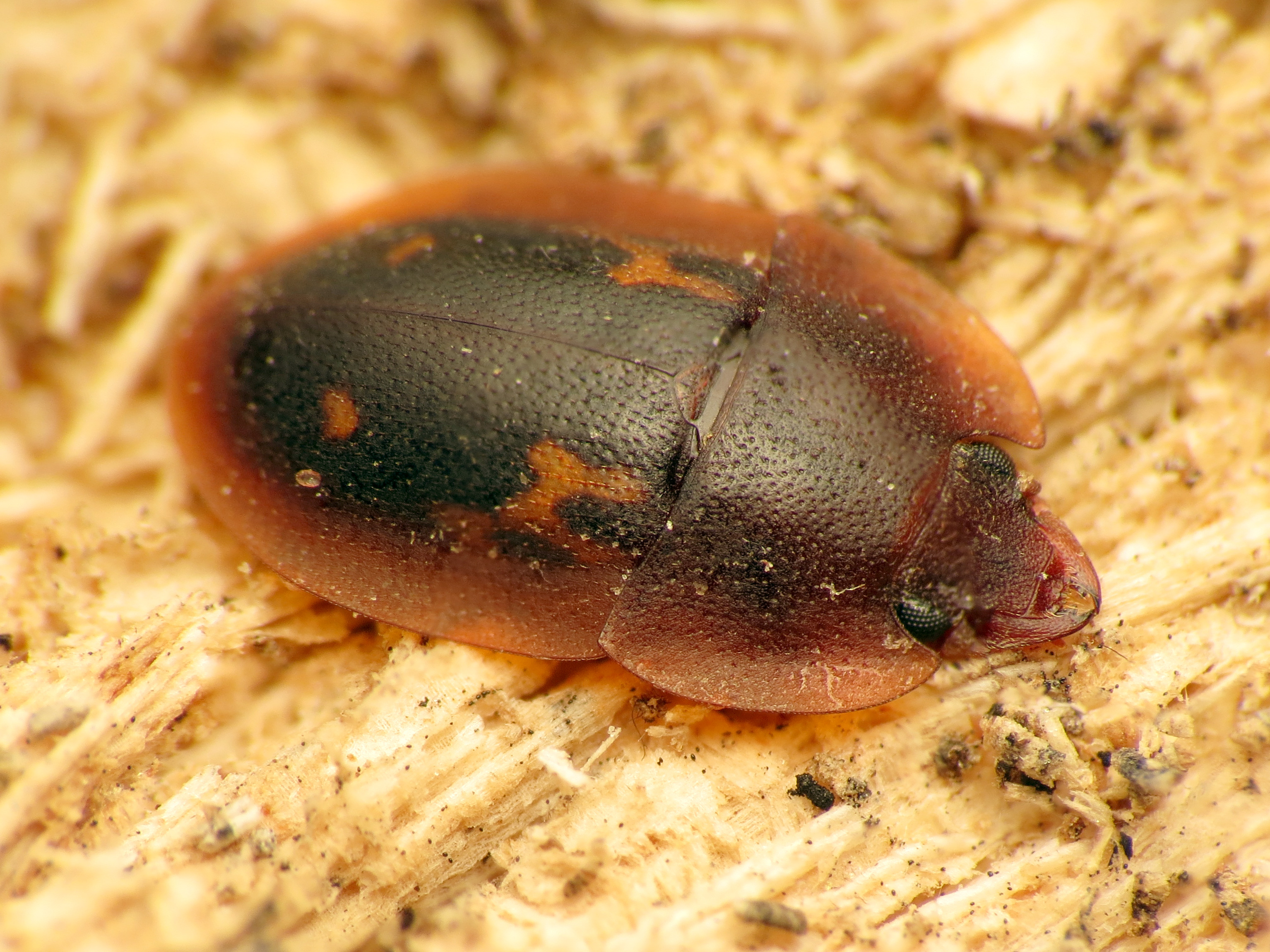

Scientific classification
- Domain: Eukaryota
- Kingdom: Animalia
- Phylum: Arthropoda
- Class: Insecta
- Order: Coleoptera
- Suborder: Polyphaga
- Infraorder: Cucujiformia
- Family: Nitidulidae
- Genus: Prometopia
- Species: P. sexmaculata

Binomial name
- Prometopia sexmaculata (Say, 1825)

= Prometopia sexmaculata =

Species of beetle

Prometopia sexmaculata is a species of sap-feeding beetle in the family Nitidulidae. It is found in North America.
