= Carpophilus discoideus =

Scientific classification
- Domain: Eukaryota
- Kingdom: Animalia
- Phylum: Arthropoda
- Class: Insecta
- Order: Coleoptera
- Suborder: Polyphaga
- Infraorder: Cucujiformia
- Family: Nitidulidae
- Genus: Carpophilus
- Species: C. discoideus

Binomial name
- Carpophilus discoideus LeConte, 1858

Synonyms
- Carpophilus apicalis LeConte, 1859; Carpophilus caudalis (LeConte, 1859)

Species of beetle

Carpophilus discoideus is a species of sap-feeding beetle in the family Nitidulidae. It is found in North America.
