= Amphicrossus niger =

Scientific classification
- Domain: Eukaryota
- Kingdom: Animalia
- Phylum: Arthropoda
- Class: Insecta
- Order: Coleoptera
- Suborder: Polyphaga
- Infraorder: Cucujiformia
- Family: Nitidulidae
- Genus: Amphicrossus
- Species: A. niger

Binomial name
- Amphicrossus niger Horn, 1879

Species of beetle

Amphicrossus niger is a species of sap-feeding beetle in the family Nitidulidae. It is found in North America.
