= Brassicogethes aeneus =

Scientific classification
- Domain: Eukaryota
- Kingdom: Animalia
- Phylum: Arthropoda
- Class: Insecta
- Order: Coleoptera
- Suborder: Polyphaga
- Infraorder: Cucujiformia
- Family: Nitidulidae
- Genus: Brassicogethes
- Species: B. aeneus

Binomial name
- Brassicogethes aeneus (Fabricius, 1775)

Synonyms
- Meligethes californicus LeConte, 1857; Meligethes dauricus Reitter, 1871; Meligethes moerens LeConte, 1868; Meligethes mutatus Harold, 1868; Meligethes rufimanus Motschulsky, 1849

Species of beetle

Brassicogethes aeneus, the common pollen beetle, is a species of pollen beetle in the family Nitidulidae. Other common names include the rape pollen beetle and rape blossom beetle. It was previously known as Meligethes aeneus.

It is found in Europe and Northern Asia (excluding China) and North America.

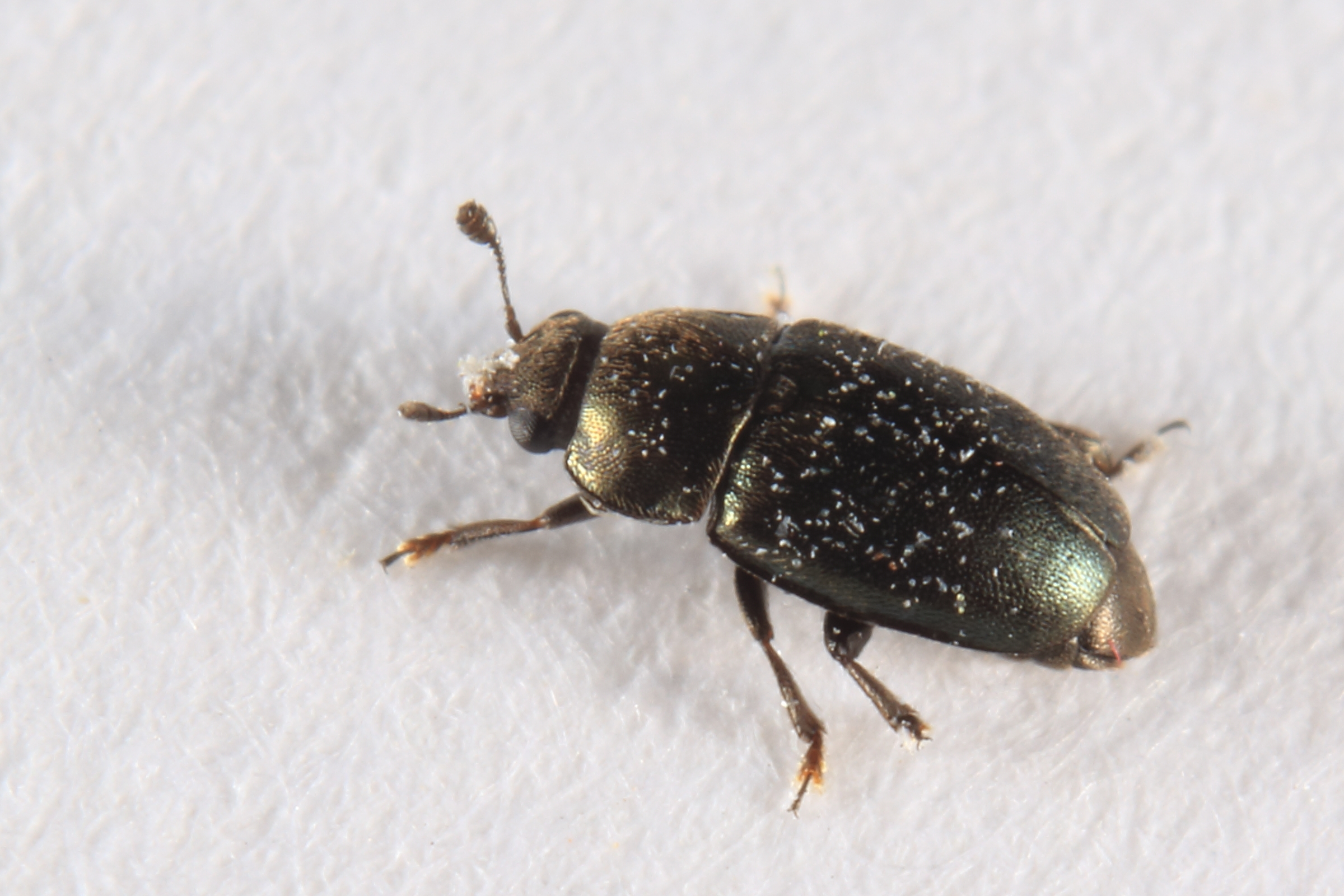

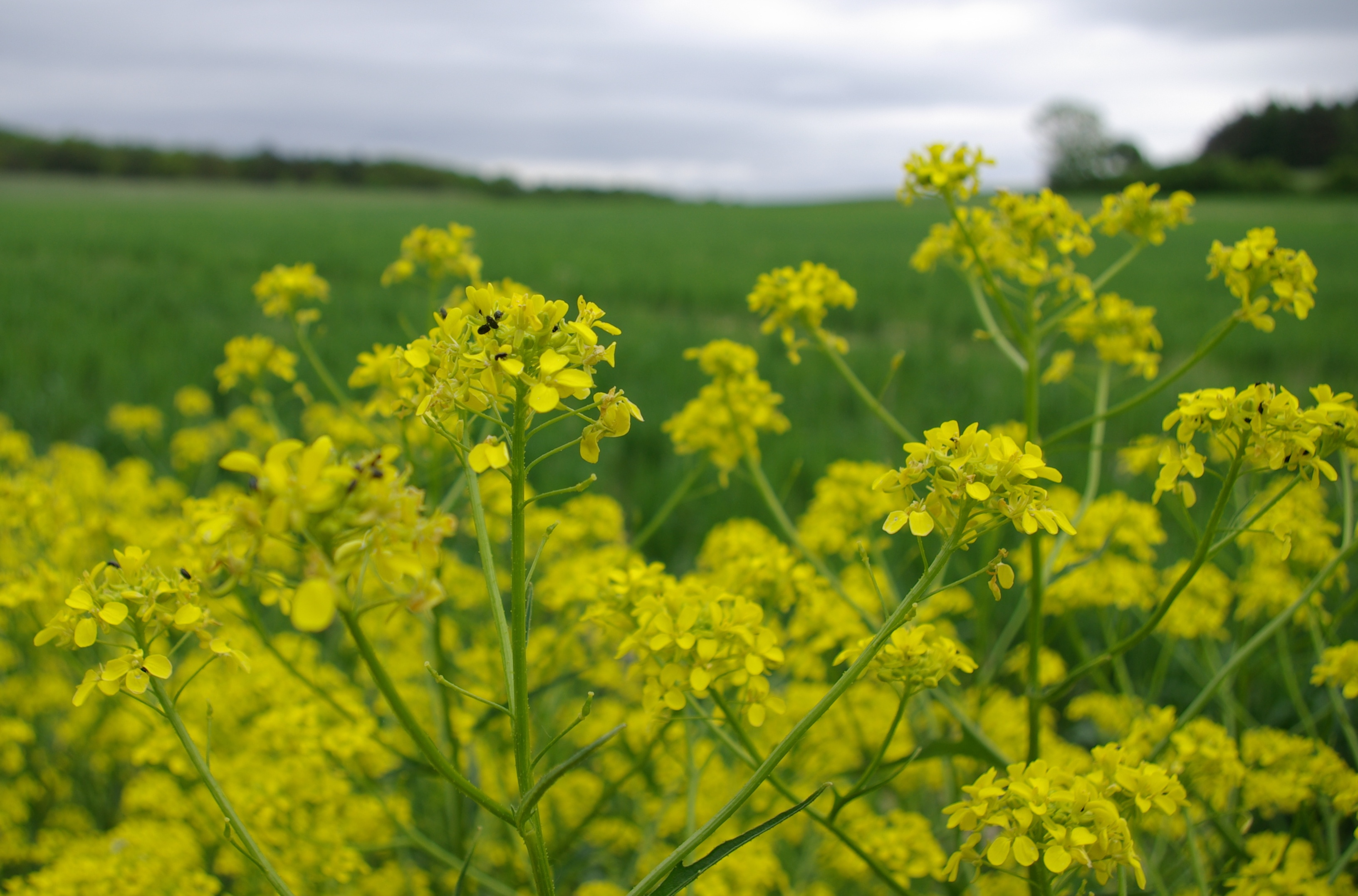

A subspecies of Brassicogethes aeneus is B. aeneus dauricus.

Adults are about 2–3 mm long, 1–2 mm wide and black with a hint of metallic green. The larvae are up to 3 mm long and white with brown sclerotised plates.

Brassicogethes aeneus is an important pest of oilseed rape. It is not known whether it contributes to the pollination of the crop.

The female beetle lays its eggs in the flower buds of the host-plant and the larvae develop within the flowers. Oviposition and feeding damage the buds of oilseed rape and similar Brassicas and may cause the flowers to drop. Both adults and larvae feed on the pollen and nectar in the flowers.

== See also ==
- List of pollen beetles (Nitidulidae) recorded in Britain
