= Carpophilus brevipennis =

Scientific classification
- Kingdom: Animalia
- Phylum: Arthropoda
- Class: Insecta
- Order: Coleoptera
- Suborder: Polyphaga
- Infraorder: Cucujiformia
- Family: Nitidulidae
- Genus: Carpophilus
- Species: C. brevipennis

Binomial name
- Carpophilus brevipennis (Blanchard, 1842)

Synonyms
- Carpophilus ignobilis Fall, 1910; Carpophilus lacertosus Murray, 1864; Carpophilus purpureipennis Murray, 1864

Species of beetle

Carpophilus brevipennis is a species of sap-feeding beetle in the family Nitidulidae. It is found in Central America, North America, and South America.
