= Stelidota coenosa =

Scientific classification
- Kingdom: Animalia
- Phylum: Arthropoda
- Class: Insecta
- Order: Coleoptera
- Suborder: Polyphaga
- Infraorder: Cucujiformia
- Family: Nitidulidae
- Tribe: Nitidulini
- Genus: Stelidota
- Species: S. coenosa

Binomial name
- Stelidota coenosa Erichson, 1843

Species of beetle

Stelidota coenosa is a species of sap-feeding beetle in the family Nitidulidae. It is found in North America.
