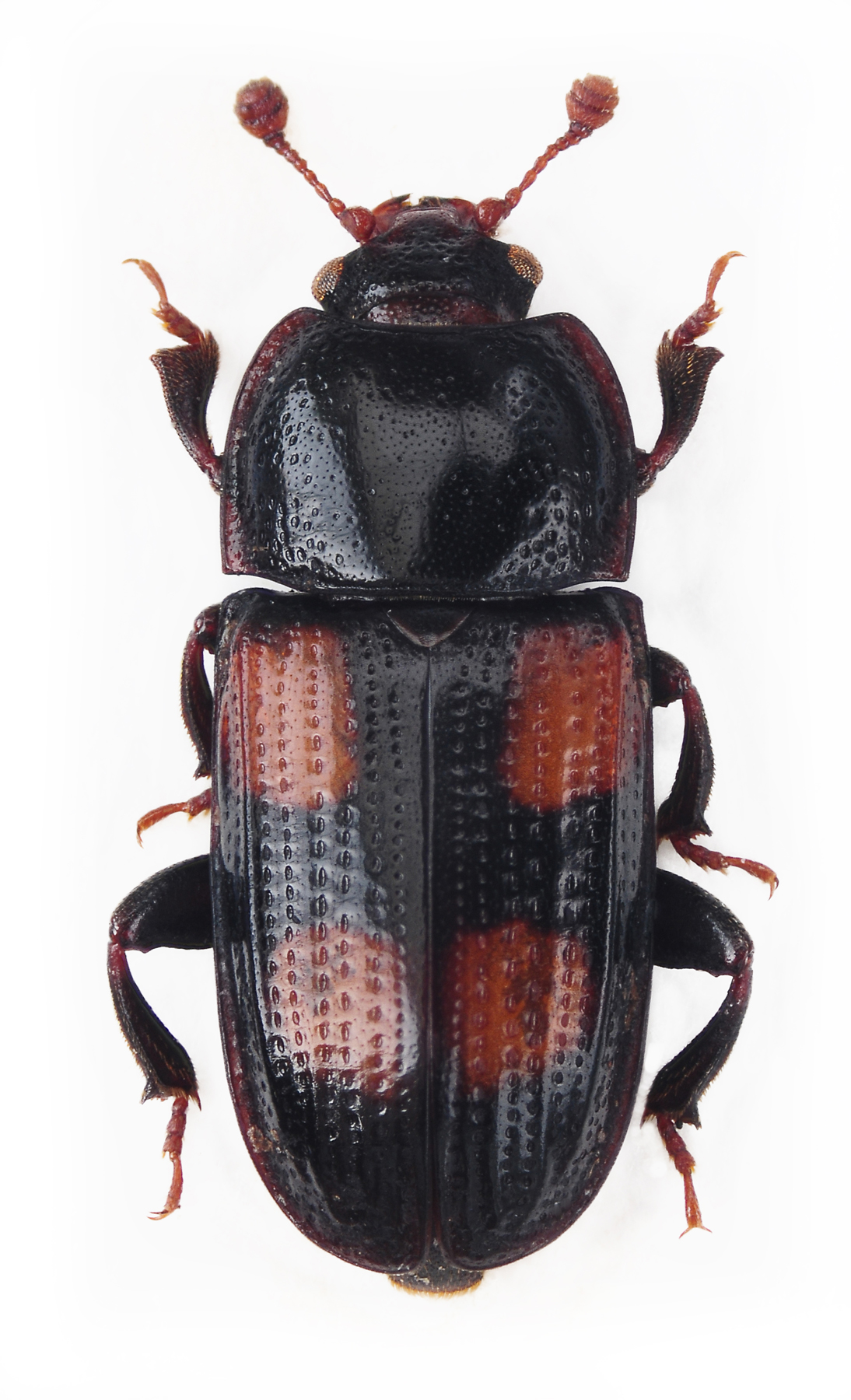
- Ipidia binotata

Scientific classification
- Kingdom: Animalia
- Phylum: Arthropoda
- Class: Insecta
- Order: Coleoptera
- Suborder: Polyphaga
- Infraorder: Cucujiformia
- Family: Nitidulidae
- Genus: Ipidia; Erichson, 1843

= Ipidia =

Genus of beetles

Ipidia is a genus of beetles belonging to the family Nitidulidae.

The species of this genus are found in Europe and Japan.

Species:

- Ipidia binotata Reitter, 1875
- Ipidia chujoi Hisamatsu, 1982
