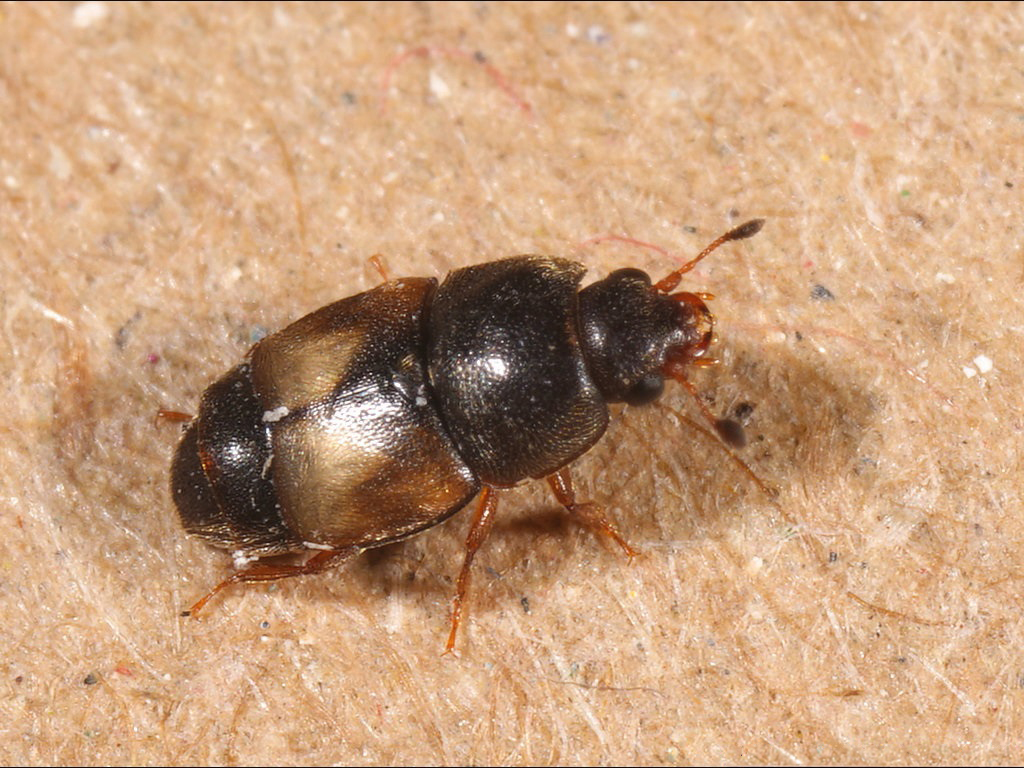

Scientific classification
- Kingdom: Animalia
- Phylum: Arthropoda
- Class: Insecta
- Order: Coleoptera
- Suborder: Polyphaga
- Infraorder: Cucujiformia
- Family: Nitidulidae
- Genus: Carpophilus
- Species: C. hemipterus

Binomial name
- Carpophilus hemipterus (Linnaeus, 1758)

= Carpophilus hemipterus =

Species of beetle

Carpophilus hemipterus, the dried-fruit beetle, is a species of sap-feeding beetle in the family Nitidulidae. It is found in North America, Oceania, and Europe.

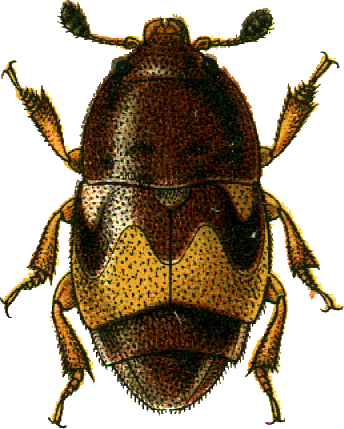
Dried-fruit beetle, Carpophilus hemipterus
