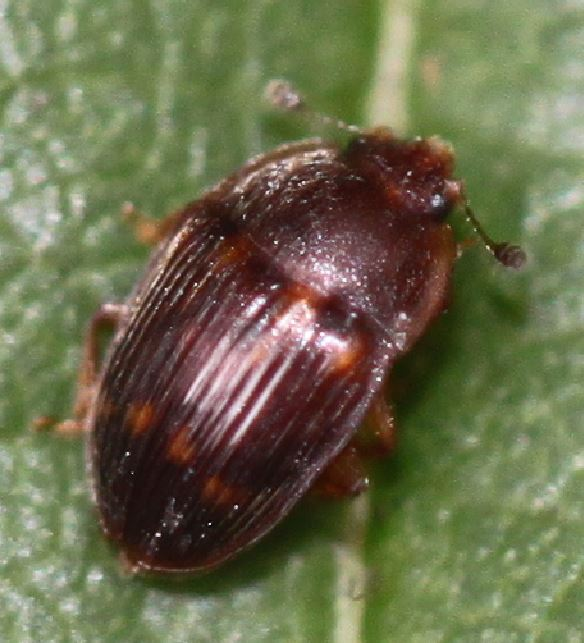

Scientific classification
- Domain: Eukaryota
- Kingdom: Animalia
- Phylum: Arthropoda
- Class: Insecta
- Order: Coleoptera
- Suborder: Polyphaga
- Infraorder: Cucujiformia
- Family: Nitidulidae
- Genus: Stelidota
- Species: S. geminata

Binomial name
- Stelidota geminata (Say, 1825)

= Stelidota geminata =

Species of beetle

Stelidota geminata, the strawberry sap beetle, is a species of sap-feeding beetle in the family Nitidulidae. It is found in Central America, North America, Oceania, South America, Europe, and temperate Asia.

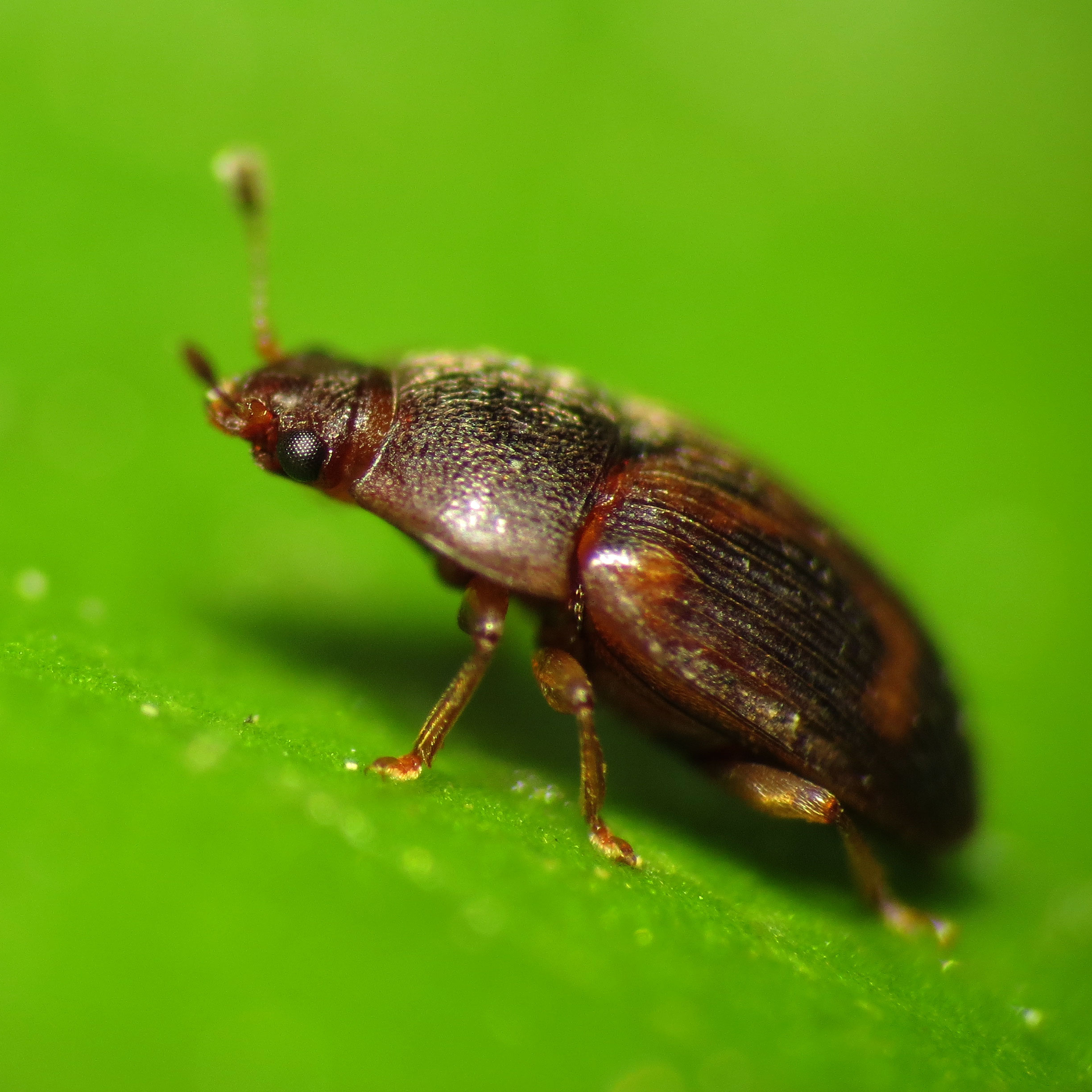
Strawberry sap beetle, Stelidota geminata

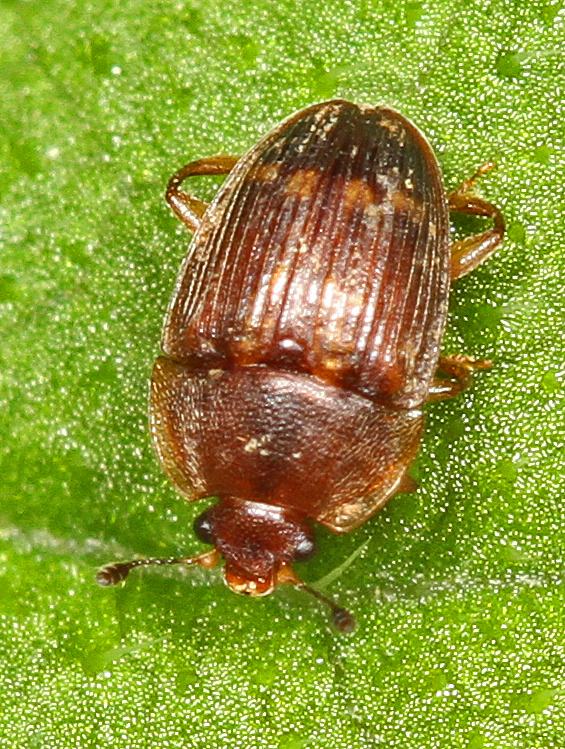
Strawberry sap beetle, Stelidota geminata
