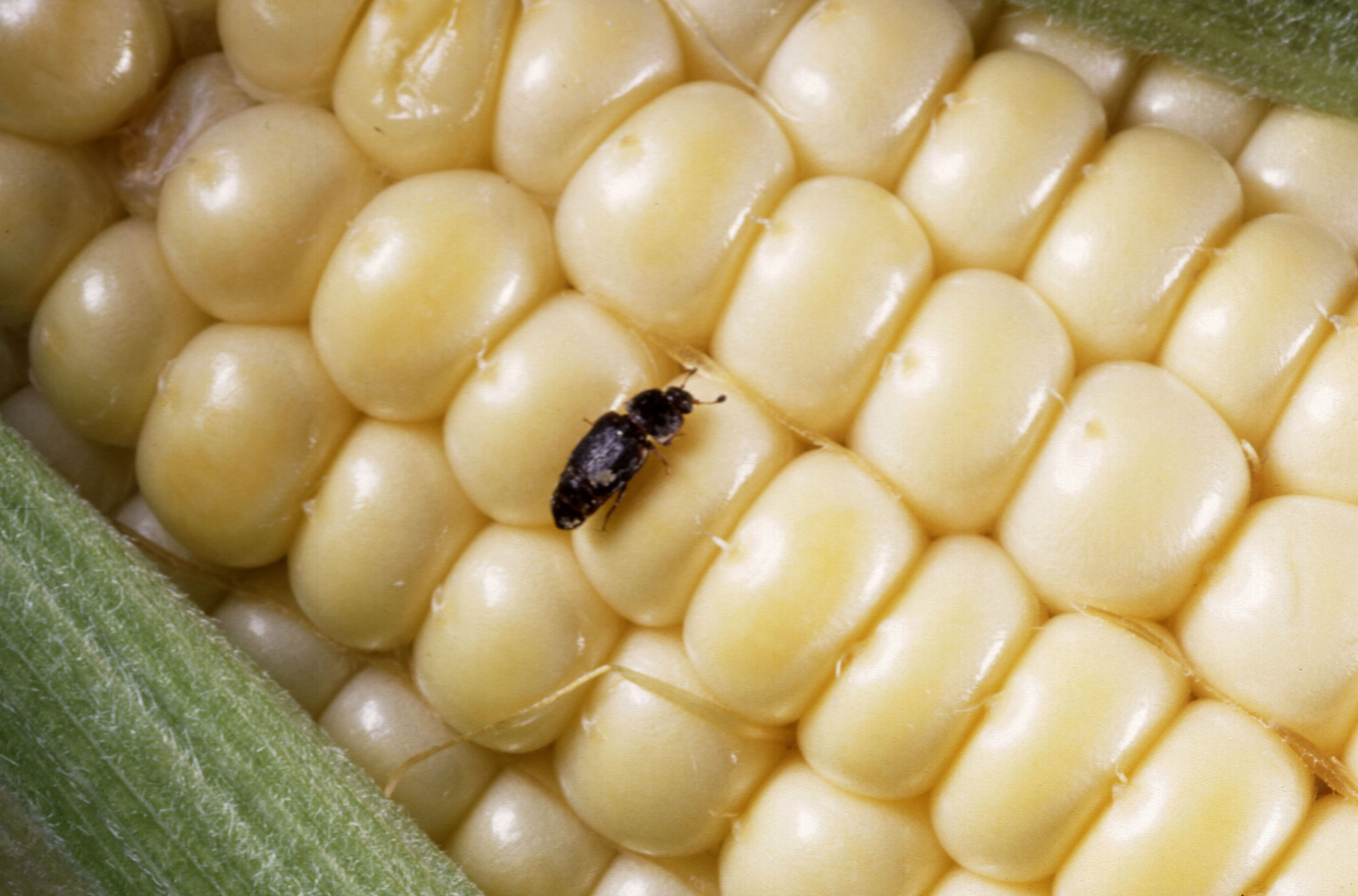

Scientific classification
- Kingdom: Animalia
- Phylum: Arthropoda
- Clade: Pancrustacea
- Class: Insecta
- Order: Coleoptera
- Suborder: Polyphaga
- Infraorder: Cucujiformia
- Family: Nitidulidae
- Genus: Carpophilus
- Species: C. lugubris

Binomial name
- Carpophilus lugubris Murray, 1864

= Carpophilus lugubris =

Species of beetle

Carpophilus lugubris, commonly known as the dusky sap beetle, is a species of beetle in the genus Carpophilus. It is an agricultural pest of corn and tomato.

== Description ==
A long-lived species, the dusky sap beetle can live as an adult for up to 300 days. Measuring 3.3-4.5 mm, this beetle is primarily brown but has orange colouration on its elytra. Depressions can be seen on each side of the pygidium, which is a characteristic of males. Additionally, the genital capsule, which is quite distinct, cannot be seen from an overhead view. Eggs produced by adults are white and oval in shape. Similarly, the larvae can be white or yellow in body colour, with a brown head. This image, taken from Marini 2013, can provide a better look at the adult morphology and colouration.

== Habitat ==
Like other sap beetles, fruit secretions are the primary food source, but they will also consume fungi, decomposing fruit and even pollen. Carpophilus lugubris is capable of feeding on undamaged fruits as well, corn being its primary food source. The species is long-lived, so they will take up shelter in adverse environmental conditions. One such refuge is the bottom of beehives, which are often located close to crops. Going underground during the pupa and adult stages allows them to survive the winter. Larva and adults will often have overlapping niches, with the larva developing on the ears of the corn and eventually feeding on the kernels.

== Distribution ==
Native to North America, C. lugubris can be found throughout southern Canada, the United States, and as far as South America. Reports have even indicated its spread to southern European countries, such as Italy. Only very cold climatic regions are free of the genus Carpophilus.

== Life cycle ==
Like the typical beetle life cycle, C. lugubris has four life stages: egg, larva, pupa and adult. Eggs are often laid on the silk of corn and have a generation time of 2–4 days. 3-5 eggs will be laid at a time and the optimal temperature is 21 °C. The larval stage begins feeding on corn kernels and undergoes 3-4 instars before entering the pupa stage. This stage will often last for roughly 3 weeks. When ready to pupate, the larva falls to the ground and buries itself. Pupation may last 9–10 days before reemerging, but it can be longer if overwintering becomes necessary. Once exiting from the ground, the adult will use pheromones to locate a new food source and possible mating location.

== Ecological impacts ==
The ability to attack undamaged fruits and vegetables makes the genus Carpophilus a large threat to economic crops. Dusky sap beetle is a common pest of corn in North America, but tomato plants are also at risk. Larvae present in corn kernels often go undiscovered and this can lead to their rejection and subsequent discarding. The beetles can also act as vectors for fungi transfer to crop plants. Related species act as vectors for disease, such as oak wilt.

The use of the dusky sap beetle to fight fungal infections is a possibility as well. This involves using the beetle to deliver Bacillus subtilis, a bacterium which kills the fungus Aspergillus flavus.

== Management ==
Insecticides are not often applied in direct response to C. lugubris, but they are still effective when targeting other species. A more effective approach is to ensure that crops are not left unharvested, as these plants will provide food for overwintering individuals.

The use of pheromones by Carpophilus species has influenced traps and lures to protect crops.

Radio frequency irradiation is a possible way of killing larvae hidden in the fruit.

In North Carolina, early corn planting has been shown to reduce the number of damaged plants when compared with later planting.
