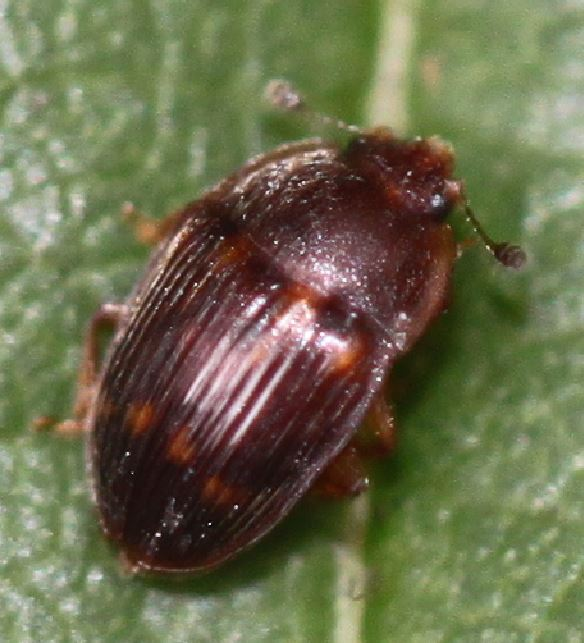
- Stelidota geminata

Scientific classification
- Kingdom: Animalia
- Phylum: Arthropoda
- Class: Insecta
- Order: Coleoptera
- Suborder: Polyphaga
- Infraorder: Cucujiformia
- Family: Nitidulidae
- Subfamily: Nitidulinae
- Tribe: Nitidulini
- Genus: Stelidota; Erichson, 1843

= Stelidota =

Genus of beetles

Stelidota is a genus of sap-feeding beetles in the family Nitidulidae. There are about 15 described species in Stelidota.

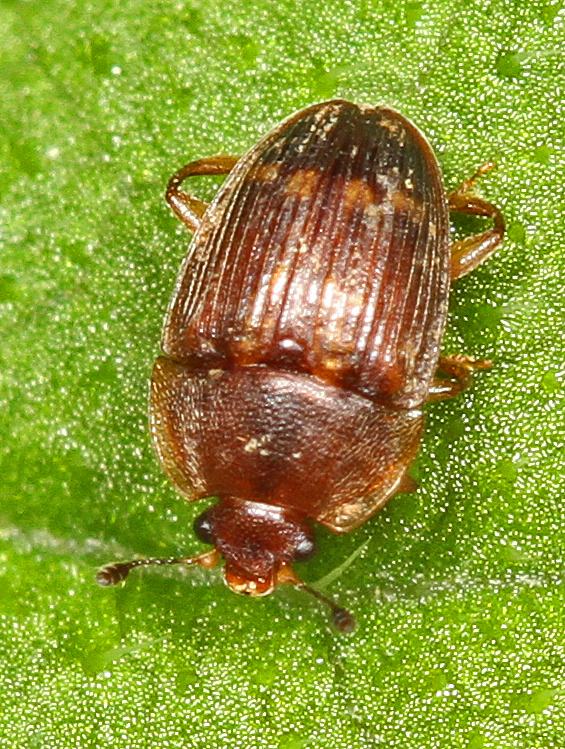
Stelidota geminata

== Species ==
These 15 species belong to the genus Stelidota:

- Stelidota adsuffusa Ford, 1996
- Stelidota alternata Gillogly
- Stelidota championi Sharp, 1890
- Stelidota chontalensis Sharp, 1889
- Stelidota coenosa Erichson, 1843
- Stelidota copiosa Kirejtshuk, 1995
- Stelidota curta Grouvelle, 1905
- Stelidota ferruginea Reitter, 1873
- Stelidota geminata (Say, 1825) (strawberry sap beetle)
- Stelidota multiguttata Reitter, 1877
- Stelidota nigrovaria (Fairmaire, 1849)
- Stelidota octomaculata (Say, 1825)
- Stelidota ruderata Erichson, 1843
- Stelidota strigosa (Gyllenhal, 1808)
- Stelidota thoracica Kirsch, 1873
