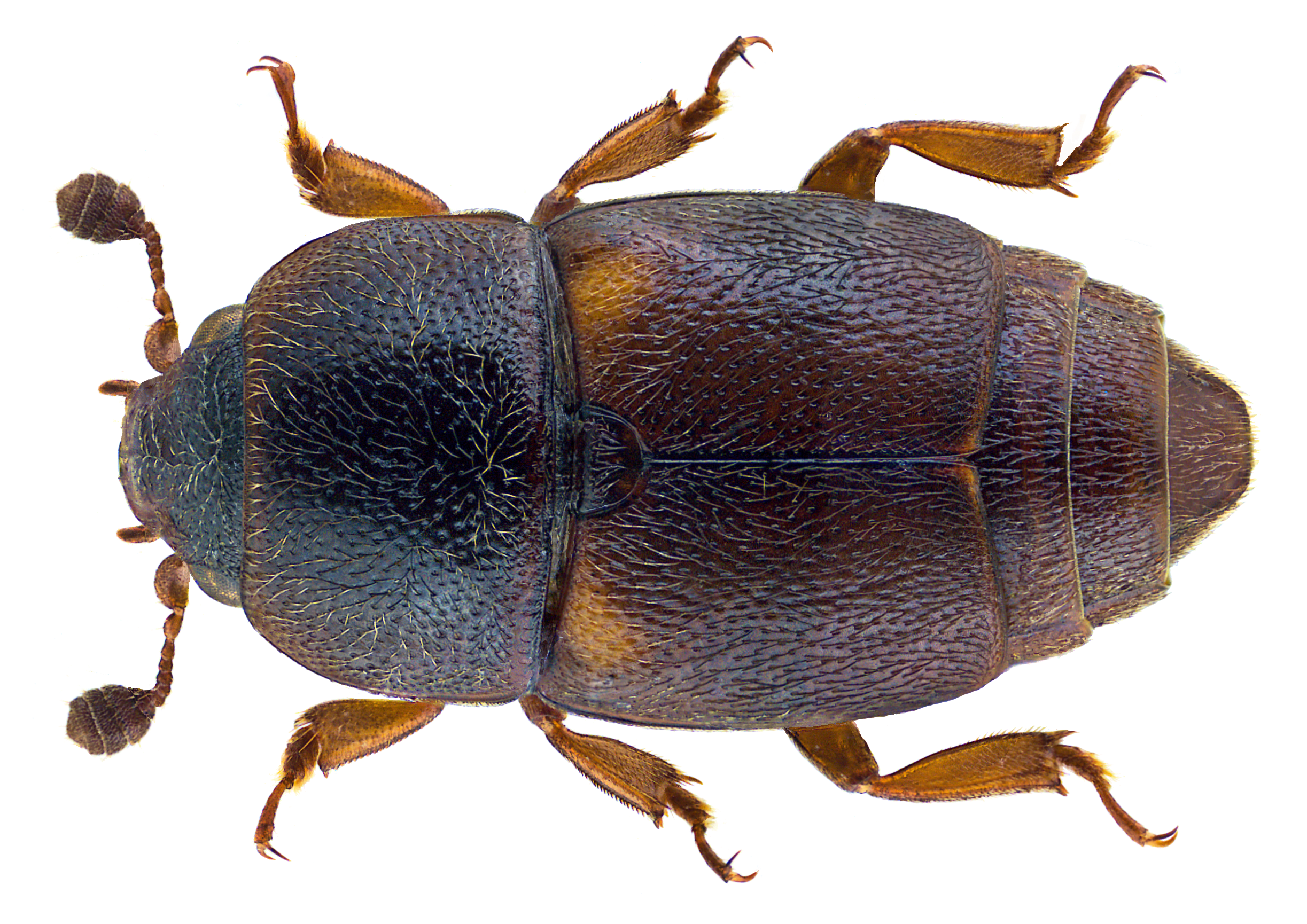
- Urophorus humeralis

Scientific classification
- Domain: Eukaryota
- Kingdom: Animalia
- Phylum: Arthropoda
- Class: Insecta
- Order: Coleoptera
- Suborder: Polyphaga
- Infraorder: Cucujiformia
- Family: Nitidulidae
- Subfamily: Carpophilinae
- Genus: Urophorus; Murray, 1864

= Urophorus =

Genus of beetles

Urophorus is a genus of sap-feeding beetles in the family Nitidulidae. There are at least two described species in Urophorus.

== Species ==
These two species belong to the genus Urophorus:

- Urophorus humeralis (Fabricius, 1798) (pineapple beetle)
- Urophorus yakushenkoi Audisio & Kirejtshuk, 1989
