= Carpophilus ligneus =

Scientific classification
- Domain: Eukaryota
- Kingdom: Animalia
- Phylum: Arthropoda
- Class: Insecta
- Order: Coleoptera
- Suborder: Polyphaga
- Infraorder: Cucujiformia
- Family: Nitidulidae
- Genus: Carpophilus
- Species: C. ligneus

Binomial name
- Carpophilus ligneus Murray, 1864

Synonyms
- Carpophilus decipiens Horn, 1879

Species of beetle

Carpophilus ligneus is a species of sap-feeding beetle in the family Nitidulidae. It is found in Europe and Northern Asia (excluding China).
