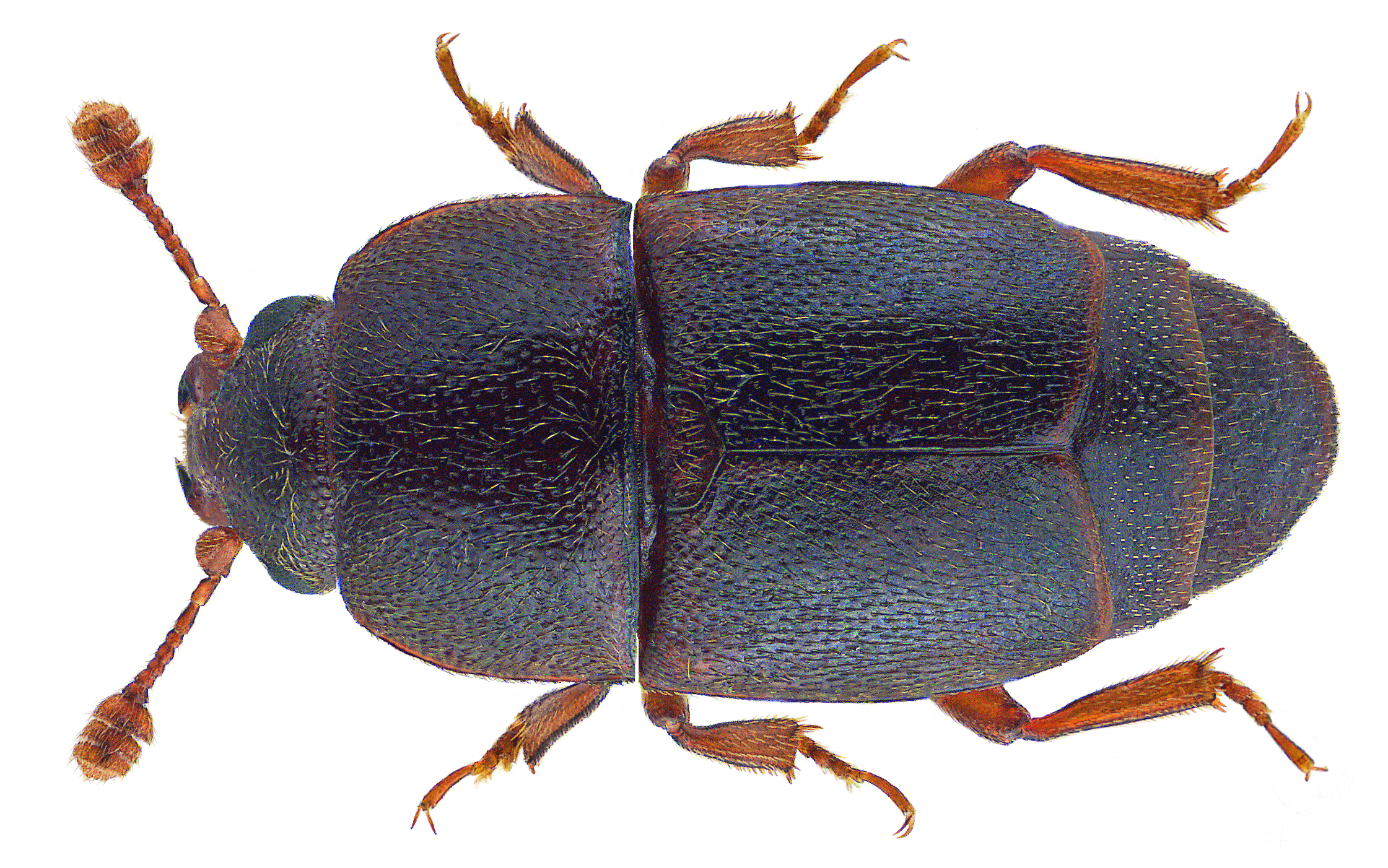
- Carpophilus marginellus

Scientific classification
- Kingdom: Animalia
- Phylum: Arthropoda
- Clade: Pancrustacea
- Class: Insecta
- Order: Coleoptera
- Suborder: Polyphaga
- Infraorder: Cucujiformia
- Family: Nitidulidae
- Subfamily: Carpophilinae; Erichson, 1842

= Carpophilinae =

Subfamily of beetles

Carpophilinae is a subfamily of sap-feeding beetles in the family Nitidulidae. The group includes the large genuses Carpophilus and Urophorus, many species of which are associated with fruits, flowers, stored products, and other plant-derived substrates.

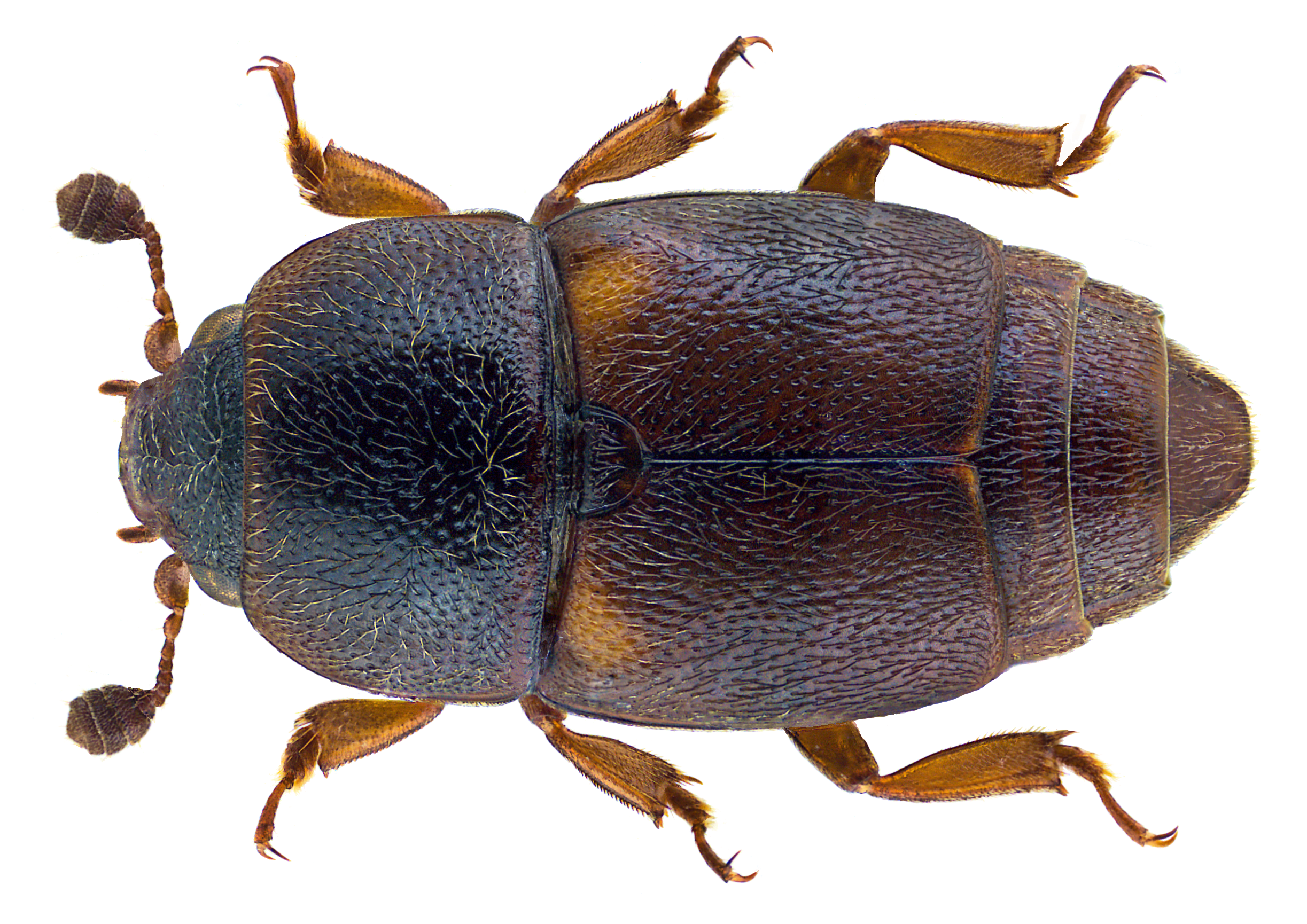
Urophorus humeralis

== Genera ==
The following genera are included in Carpophilinae, following the generic framework of Kirejtshuk (2008), with Caplothorax treated as a genus after Powell et al. (2020):

- †Procarpophilus de Jong, 1953
- Carpophilus Stephens, 1829
- Caplothorax Kirejtshuk, 1997
- Ctilodes Murray, 1864
- Epuraea Erichson, 1843
- Nitops Murray, 1864
- Urophorus Murray, 1864
- Vulpixenus Kirejtshuk, 1990

Note that the genera Ctilodes and Loriarulus, present in prior treatments, have been treated as subgenera of Carpophilus by Kirejtshuk (2018).

== Taxonomic history ==
Some older or database-derived treatments have incorrectly associated Epuraea, Aphenolia, and Amphicrossus with Carpophilinae. Current subfamilial classifications place Epuraea in Epuraeinae, with Aphenolia treated as a subgenus of Epuraea, while Amphicrossus is placed in Amphicrossinae.

Molecular studies of Nitidulidae have also supported revision of older subfamilial concepts. Cline et al. (2014) assessed subfamilial and tribal classification using molecular data, while Lee et al. (2020) sampled nine recognized nitidulid subfamilies in a phylogenetic study of feeding-habit evolution.

A molecular phylogeny of Carpophilinae by Powell et al. (2020) recovered the subfamily as a well-supported clade and elevated Caplothorax from subgeneric to generic rank.
