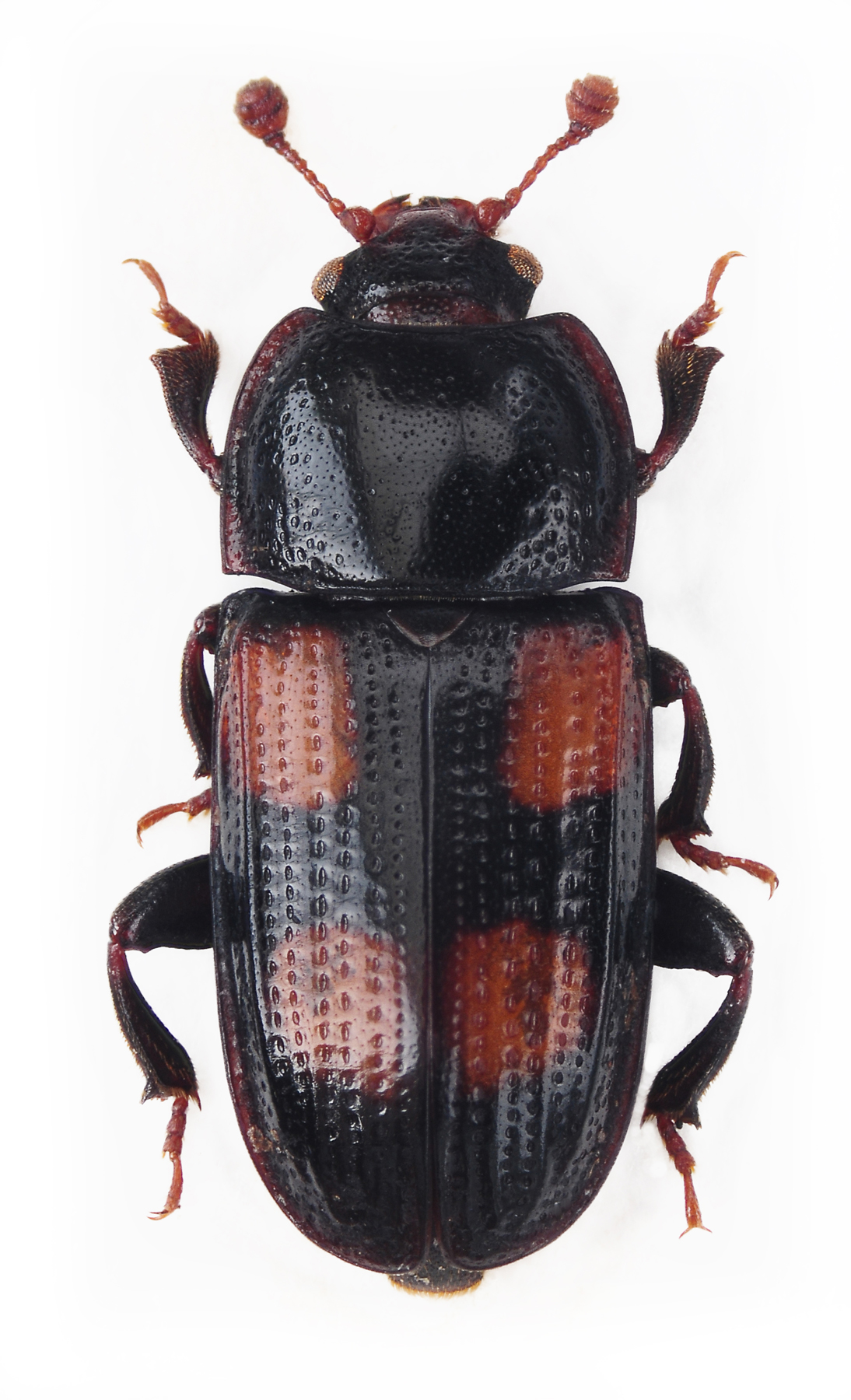

Scientific classification
- Kingdom: Animalia
- Phylum: Arthropoda
- Class: Insecta
- Order: Coleoptera
- Suborder: Polyphaga
- Infraorder: Cucujiformia
- Family: Nitidulidae
- Genus: Ipidia
- Species: I. binotata

Binomial name
- Ipidia binotata Reitter, 1875

= Ipidia binotata =

Species of beetle

Ipidia binotata is a species of beetles from sap beetle family, that can be found in Russia, Sweden, and Spain.

== Description ==
Adults are 4–4.5 millimetres (0.16–0.18 in). The body is brownish-black, and shining. The elytron have two red spots. Antenna and legs are red as well.

== Ecology ==
They live in forests and forest steppes. The larvae feed on bark conifers.
