= Prometopinae =

Scientific classification
- Domain: Eukaryota
- Kingdom: Animalia
- Phylum: Arthropoda
- Class: Insecta
- Order: Coleoptera
- Suborder: Polyphaga
- Infraorder: Cucujiformia
- Family: Nitidulidae
- Subfamily: Prometopinae; Böving & Craighead, 1931

Subfamily of beetles

Prometopinae is a subfamily of sap-feeding beetles in the family Nitidulidae. There are about eight genera in Prometopinae, including one North American genus, Prometopia.
