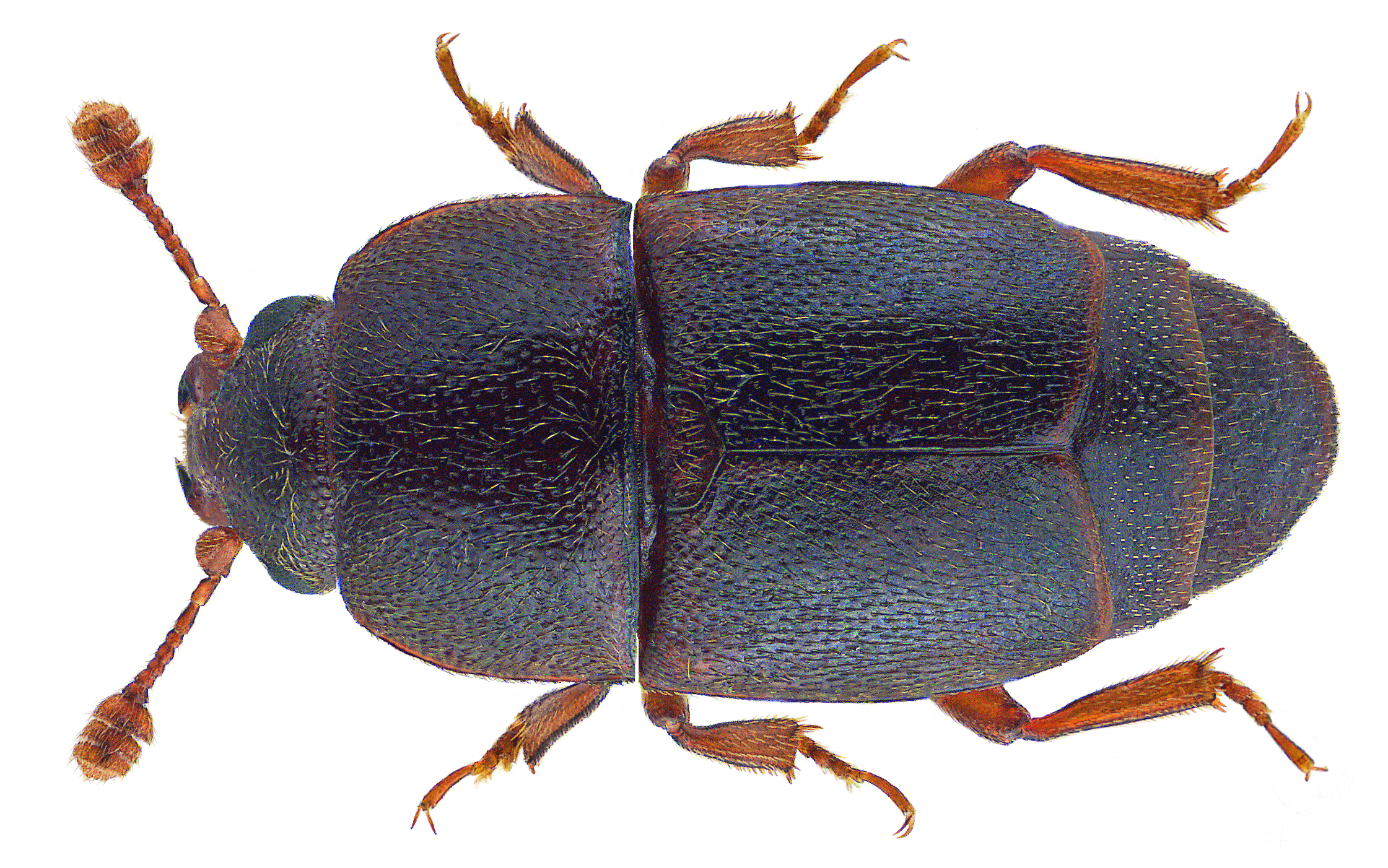

Scientific classification
- Kingdom: Animalia
- Phylum: Arthropoda
- Class: Insecta
- Order: Coleoptera
- Suborder: Polyphaga
- Infraorder: Cucujiformia
- Family: Nitidulidae
- Genus: Carpophilus
- Species: C. marginellus

Binomial name
- Carpophilus marginellus Motschulsky, 1858

Synonyms
- Carpophilus nitens Fall, 1910

= Carpophilus marginellus =

Species of beetle

Carpophilus marginellus is a species of sap-feeding beetle in the family Nitidulidae. It is found in Australia, Europe and Northern Asia (excluding China and Russia), North America, and Oceania.

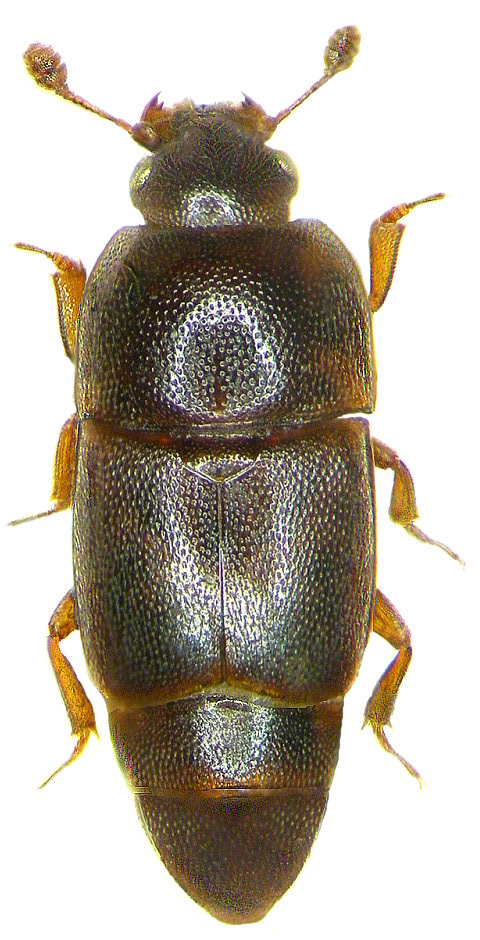
