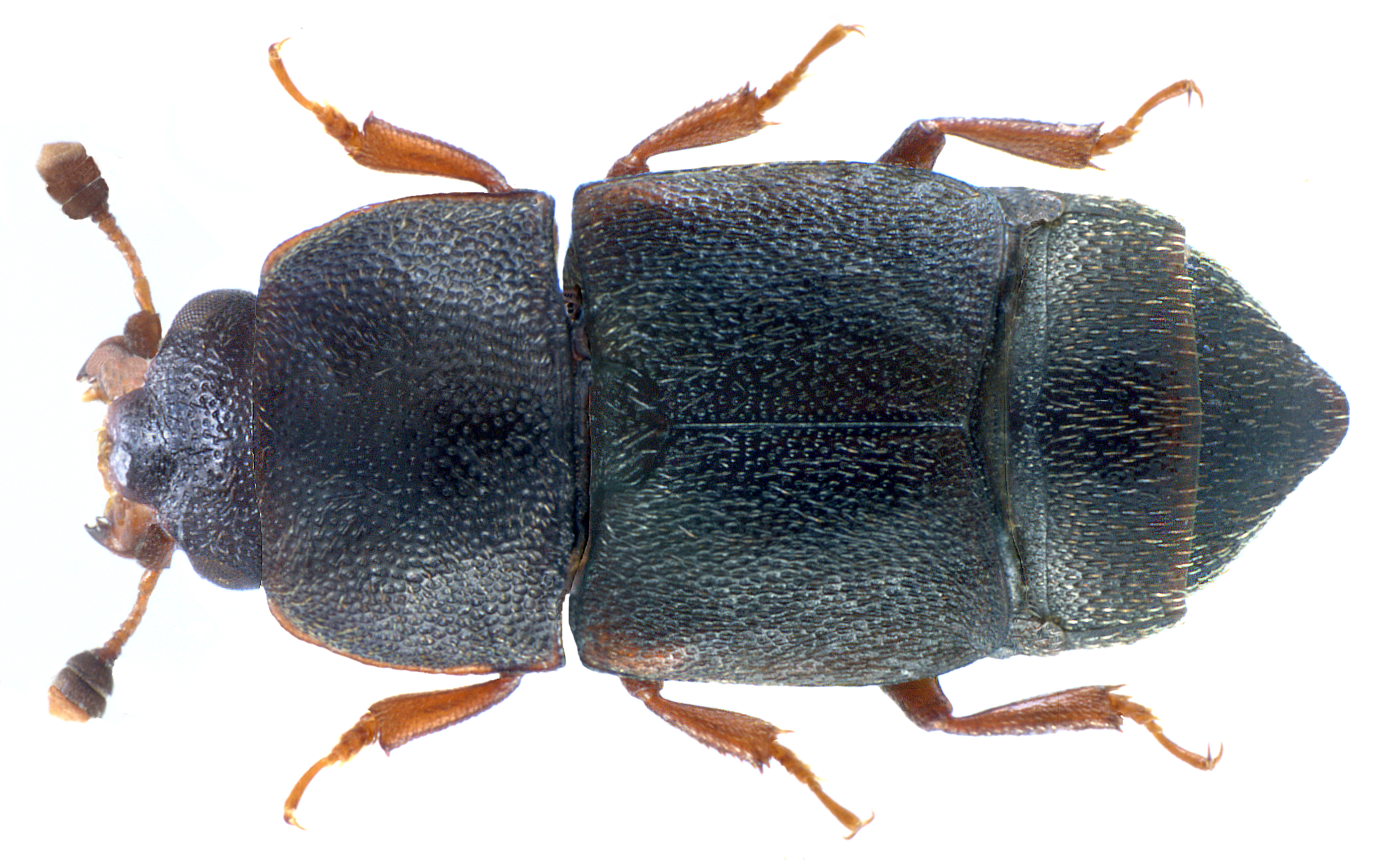

Scientific classification
- Kingdom: Animalia
- Phylum: Arthropoda
- Class: Insecta
- Order: Coleoptera
- Suborder: Polyphaga
- Infraorder: Cucujiformia
- Family: Nitidulidae
- Genus: Carpophilus
- Species: C. obsoletus

Binomial name
- Carpophilus obsoletus Erichson, 1843

Synonyms
- Carpophilus cribellatus Motschulsky, 1858; Carpophilus funereus Reitter, 1884; Carpophilus strigipennis Motschulsky, 1858

= Carpophilus obsoletus =

Species of beetle

Carpophilus obsoletus is a species of sap-feeding beetle in the family Nitidulidae. It is found in Africa, Europe and Northern Asia (excluding China), North America, and Southern Asia.
