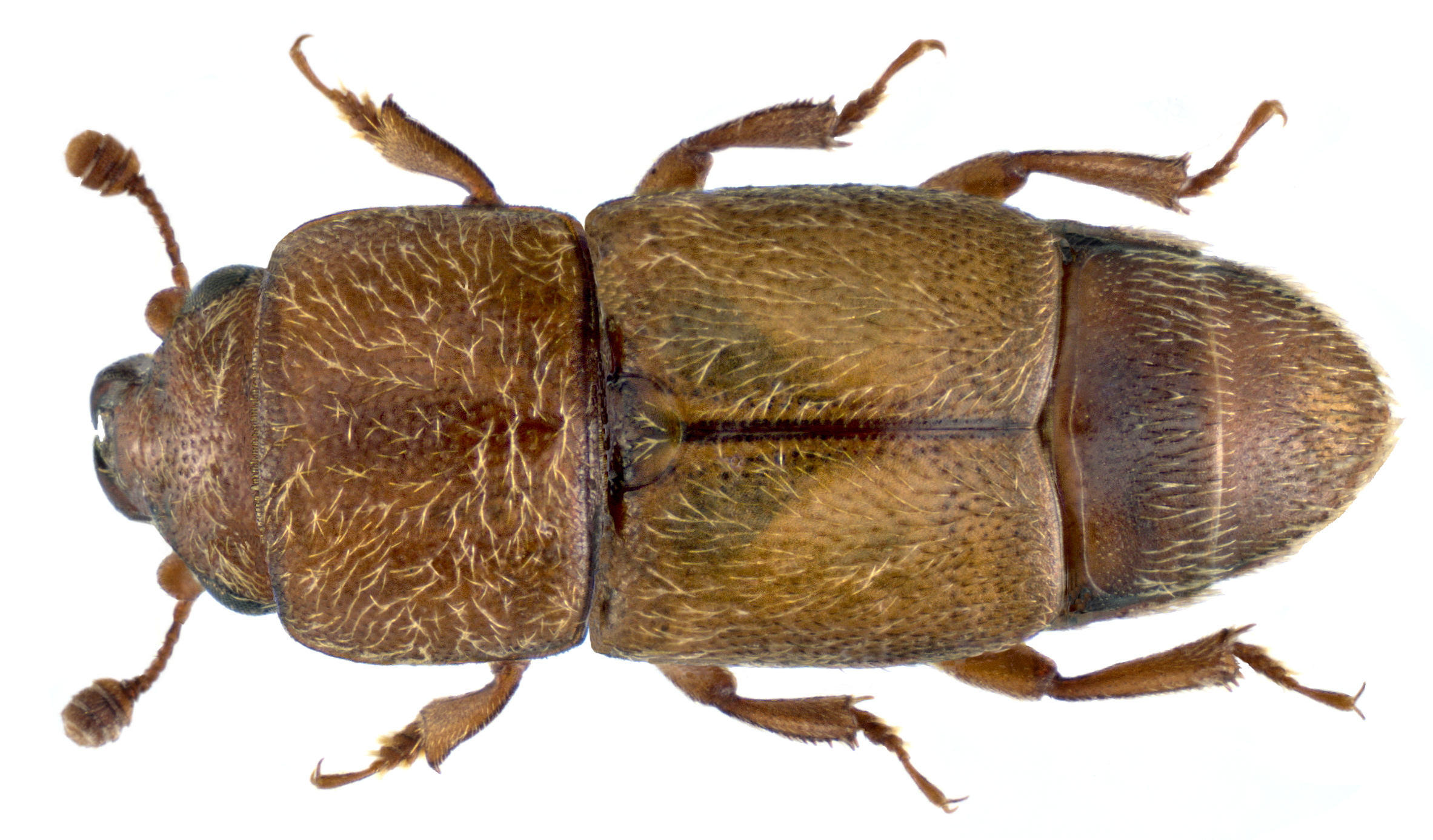

Scientific classification
- Kingdom: Animalia
- Phylum: Arthropoda
- Class: Insecta
- Order: Coleoptera
- Suborder: Polyphaga
- Infraorder: Cucujiformia
- Family: Nitidulidae
- Genus: Carpophilus
- Species: C. mutilatus

Binomial name
- Carpophilus mutilatus Erichson, 1843

Synonyms
- Carpophilus pilosellus Motschulsky, 1858

= Carpophilus mutilatus =

Species of beetle

Carpophilus mutilatus, known generally as the confused sap beetle or flower beetle, is a species of sap-feeding beetle in the family Nitidulidae. It is found in Oceania, Europe, North America, and temperate Asia.
