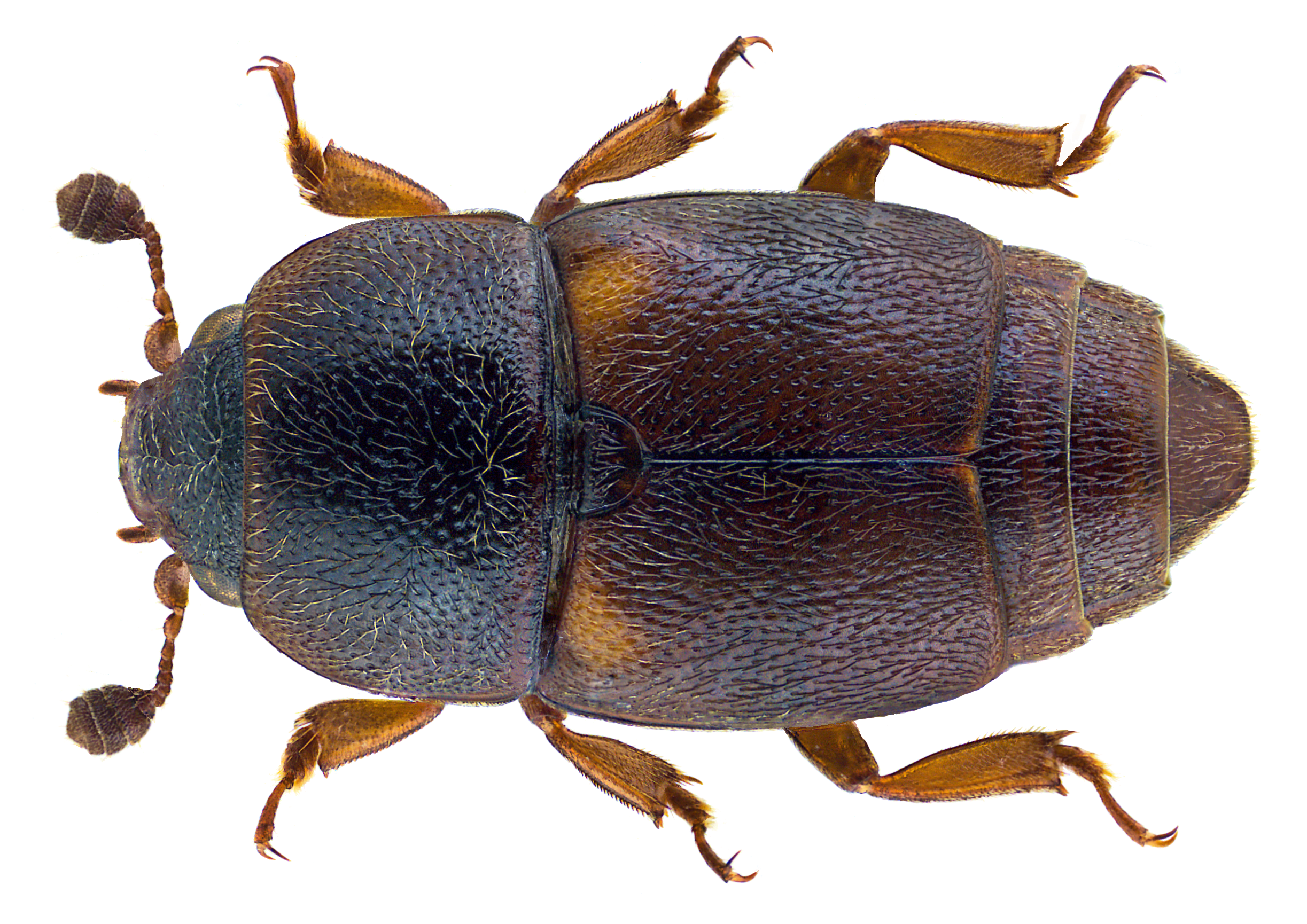

Scientific classification
- Kingdom: Animalia
- Phylum: Arthropoda
- Clade: Pancrustacea
- Class: Insecta
- Order: Coleoptera
- Suborder: Polyphaga
- Infraorder: Cucujiformia
- Family: Nitidulidae
- Genus: Urophorus
- Species: U. humeralis

Binomial name
- Urophorus humeralis (Fabricius, 1798)

Synonyms
- Carpophilus foveicollis Murray, 1864; Carpophilus picinus (Boheman, 1851); Carpophilus rickseckeri Fall, 1910

= Urophorus humeralis =

Species of beetle

Urophorus humeralis, known generally as the pineapple beetle or yellow-shouldered souring beetle, is a species of sap-feeding beetle in the family Nitidulidae. It is found in Africa, North America, Oceania, Southern Asia, Europe, and temperate Asia. The species is known to be a vector of Ceratocystis paradoxa in sugarcane in Hawaii, and the beetles are attracted to diseased sugarcane more than healthy sugarcane, with Ceratocystis paradoxa being more nutritious to U. humeralis larvae.
