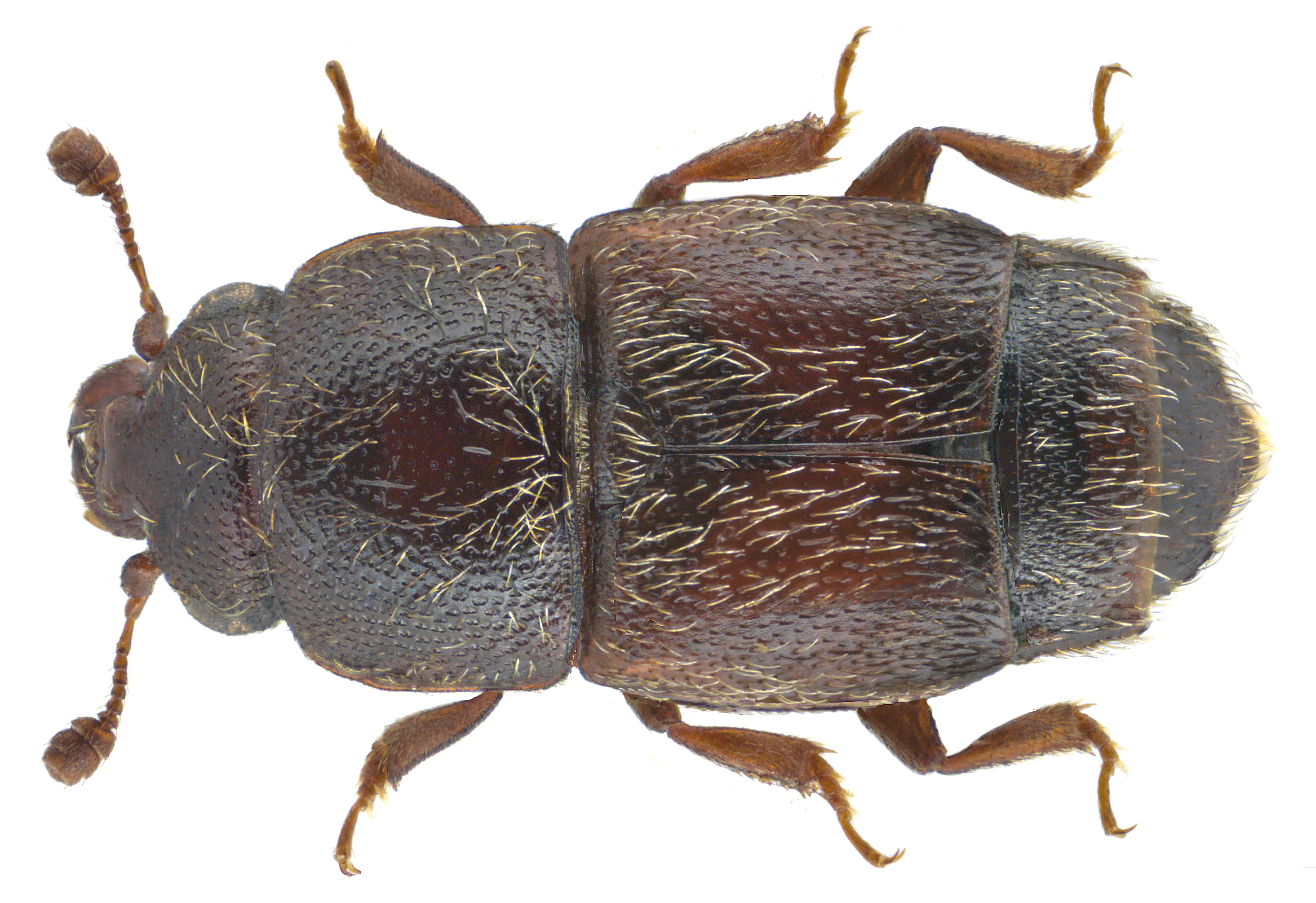

Scientific classification
- Kingdom: Animalia
- Phylum: Arthropoda
- Clade: Pancrustacea
- Class: Insecta
- Order: Coleoptera
- Suborder: Polyphaga
- Infraorder: Cucujiformia
- Family: Nitidulidae
- Genus: Carpophilus
- Species: C. dimidiatus

Binomial name
- Carpophilus dimidiatus (Fabricius, 1792)

Synonyms
- Carpophilus auropilosus Wollaston, 1854; Carpophilus contingens (Walker, 1858); Carpophilus dilutus Murray, 1864; Carpophilus lewisi Reitter, 1884; Carpophilus limbalis Murray, 1864; Carpophilus luridus Murray, 1864; Carpophilus nigritus Murray, 1864; Carpophilus ochropterus Klug, 1862; Carpophilus puberulus Montrouzier, 1860; Carpophilus pusillus Stephens, 1830; Carpophilus robustus Murray, 1864; Carpophilus testaceus Murray, 1864; Carpophilus vittiger Murray, 1864

= Carpophilus dimidiatus =

Species of beetle

Carpophilus dimidiatus, the cornsap beetle, is a species of sap-feeding beetle in the family Nitidulidae. It is found in Oceania, Europe, and North America.

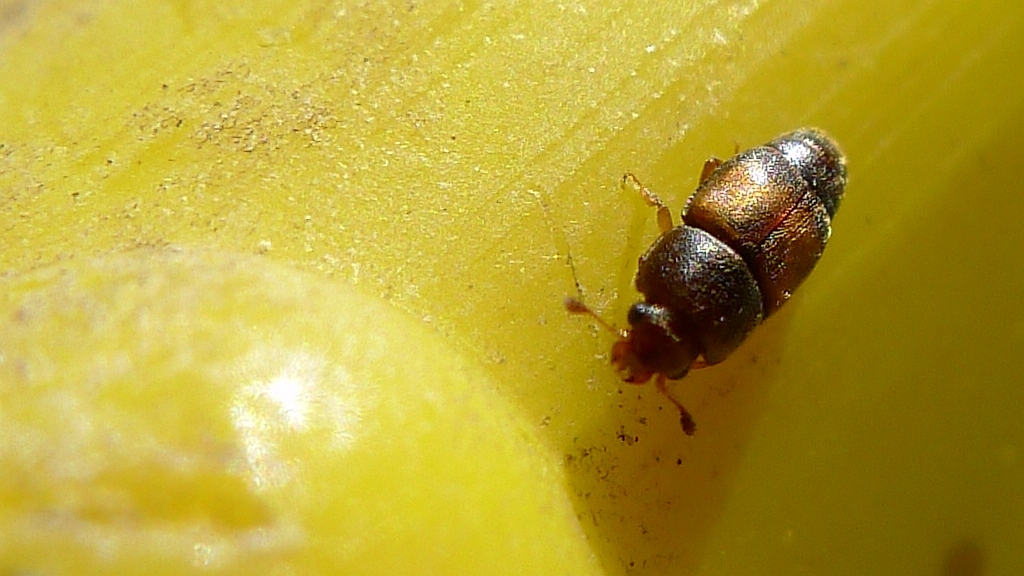
Cornsap beetle, Carpophilus dimidiatus
