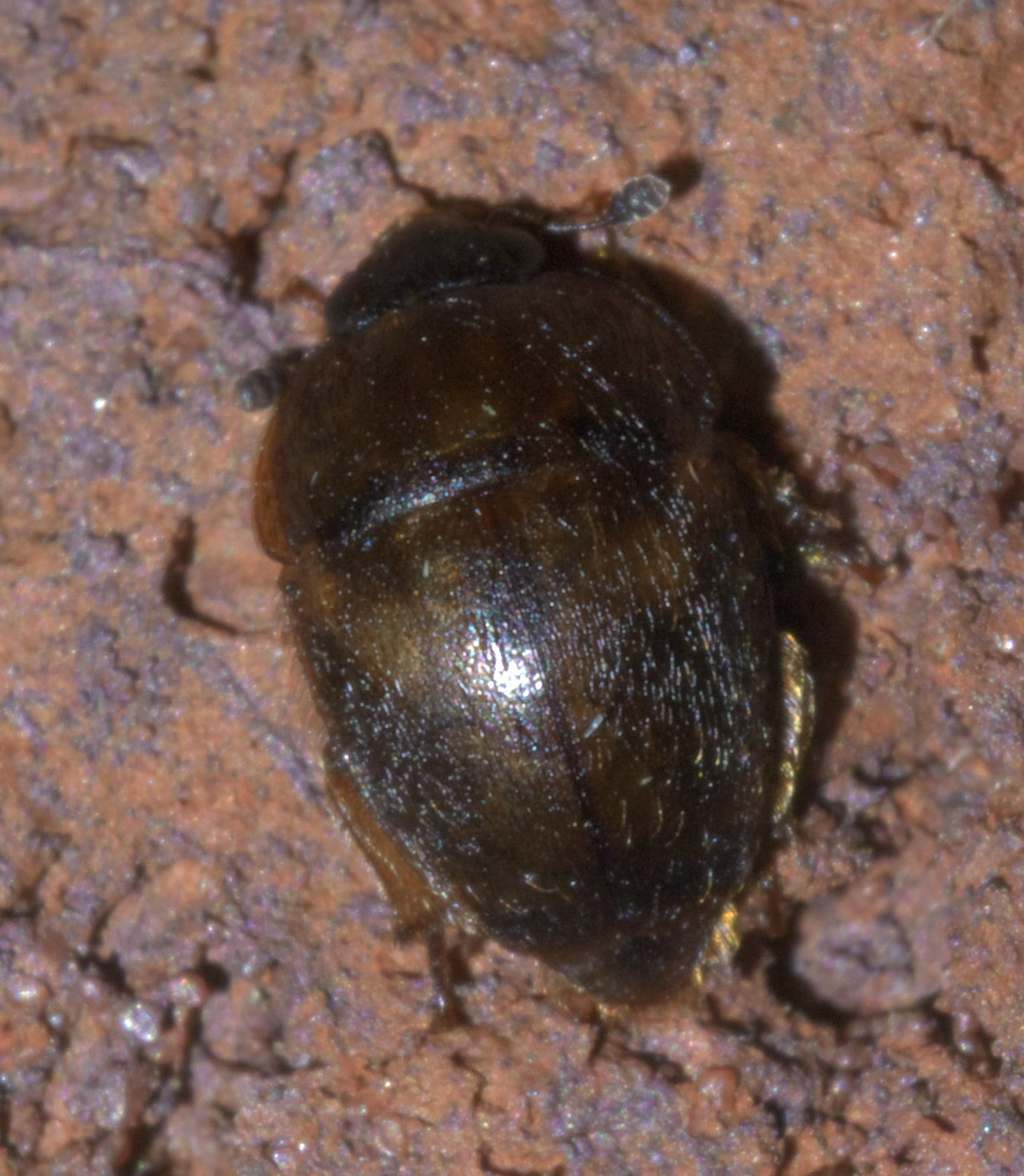
- Amphicrossus ciliatus

Scientific classification
- Kingdom: Animalia
- Phylum: Arthropoda
- Class: Insecta
- Order: Coleoptera
- Suborder: Polyphaga
- Infraorder: Cucujiformia
- Family: Nitidulidae
- Subfamily: Amphicrossinae
- Genus: Amphicrossus; Erichson, 1843

= Amphicrossus =

Genus of beetles

Amphicrossus is a genus of sap-feeding beetles in the family Nitidulidae. There are about nine described species in Amphicrossus.

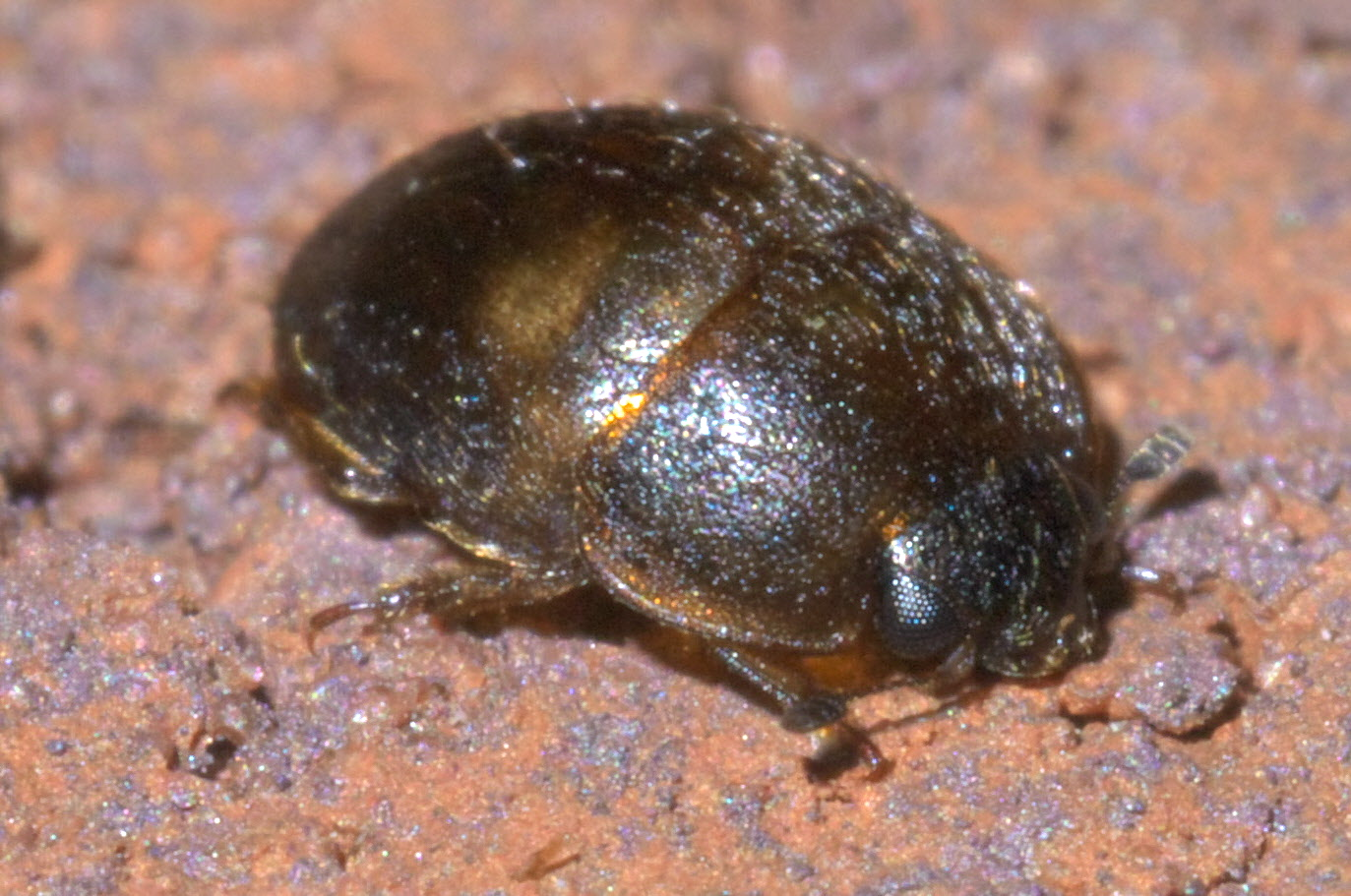
Amphicrossus ciliatus

== Species ==
These nine species belong to the genus Amphicrossus:

- Amphicrossus ciliatus (Olivier, 1811)^{i c g b}
- Amphicrossus discolor Erichson, 1843^{g}
- Amphicrossus hirtus Kirejtshuk, 2005^{g}
- Amphicrossus japonicus Reitter, 1873^{g}
- Amphicrossus lewisi Reitter, 1873^{g}
- Amphicrossus liebecki (Parsons, 1943)^{i c g}
- Amphicrossus lobanovi Kirejtshuk, 2005^{g}
- Amphicrossus niger Horn, 1879^{i c g b}
- Amphicrossus opinatus Kirejtshuk, 2005^{g}

Data sources: i = ITIS, c = Catalogue of Life, g = GBIF, b = Bugguide.net
