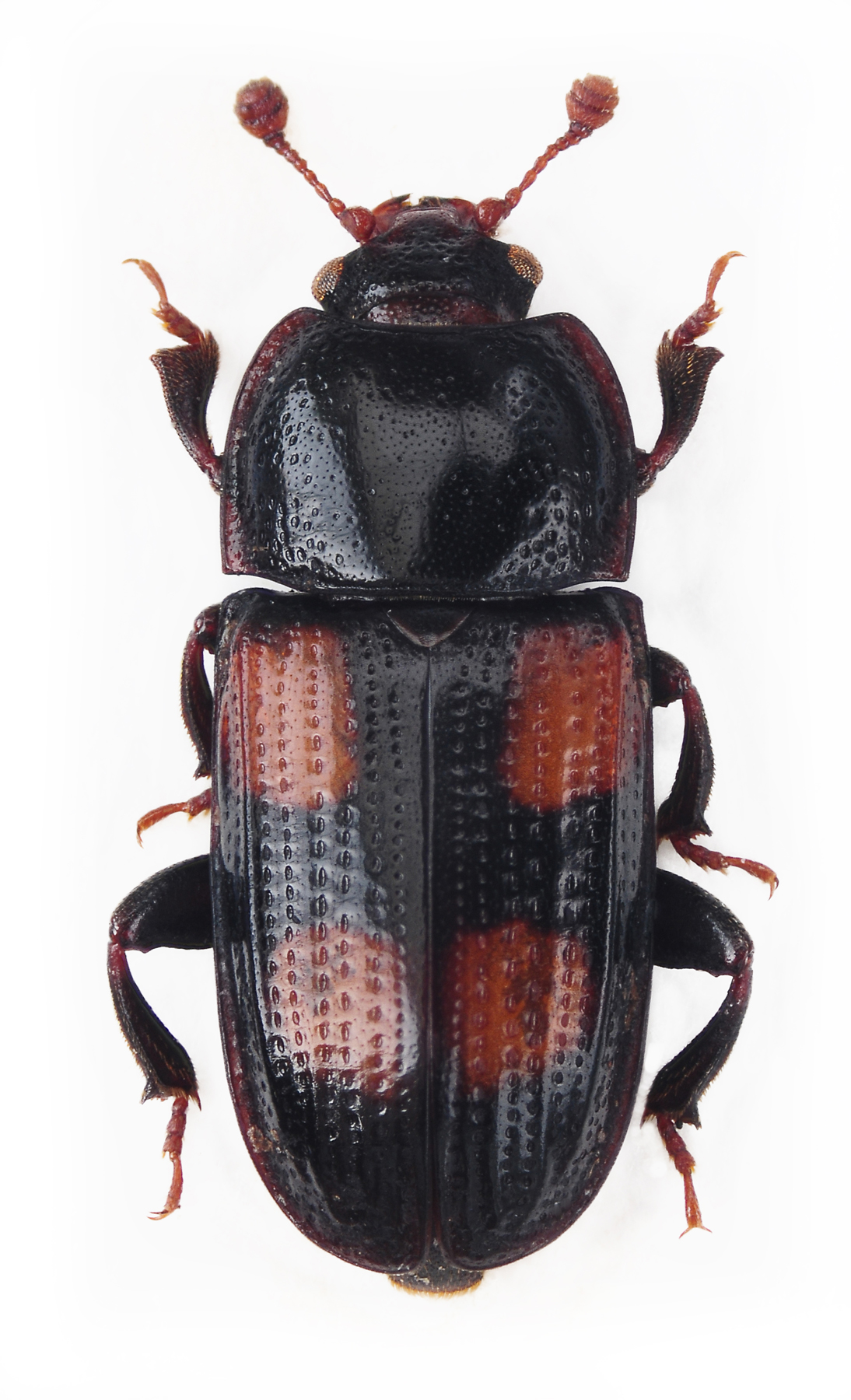
- Ipidia binotata

Scientific classification
- Kingdom: Animalia
- Phylum: Arthropoda
- Clade: Pancrustacea
- Class: Insecta
- Order: Coleoptera
- Suborder: Polyphaga
- Infraorder: Cucujiformia
- Superfamily: Cucujoidea
- Family: Nitidulidae; Latreille, 1802

= Sap beetle =

Sap beetle Temporal range: Aptian–Recent

Family of beetles

The sap beetles, also known as Nitidulidae, are a family of beetles.

They are small (2–6 mm) ovoid, usually dull-coloured beetles, with knobbed antennae. Some have red or yellow spots or bands. They feed mainly on decaying vegetable matter, over-ripe fruit, and sap. Some sap beetle species coexist with fungi species and live in habitats of coniferous trees. These fungi-dependent beetles are found in all across Europe and Siberia and are the biggest nitidulid species known in those areas. Other species like the Australian Chychramptodes murrayi are known to feed on scale insects. There are a few pest species, like the strawberry sap beetle that infest crops in Brazil between the months of August and February.

== Common types ==
Some common sap beetles include:

- the picnic beetle, Glischrochilus quadrisignatus
- the dusky sap beetle, Carpophilus lugubris
- the strawberry sap beetle, Stelidota geminata
- the small hive beetle, Aethina tumida

The oldest unambiguous fossils of the family date to the Early Cretaceous, belonging to the genus Crepuraea from the Aptian aged Zaza Formation of Russia.

== Classification ==
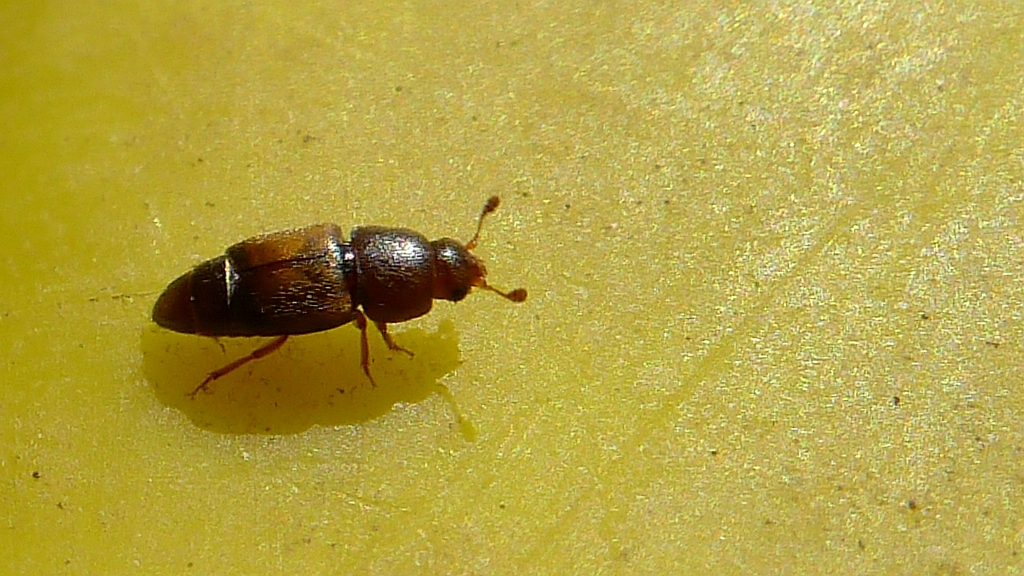
Carpophilus dimidiatus

The family includes 10 subfamilies, as well as some genera of uncertain placement:

- Subfamily Amphicrossinae Kirejtshuk, 1986
- Subfamily Calonecrinae Kirejtshuk, 1982
- Subfamily Carpophilinae Erichson, 1842
- Subfamily Cillaeinae Kirejtshuk & Audisio, 1986
- Subfamily Cryptarchinae Thomson, 1859
- Subfamily Epuraeinae Kirejtshuk, 1986
- Subfamily Maynipeplinae Kirejtshuk, 1998
- Subfamily Meligethinae Thomson, 1859
- Subfamily Nitidulinae Latreille, 1802
- Subfamily Prometopinae
- incertae sedis
  - Apetinus
  - Conotelus
  - Cyrtostolus
  - Eunitidula
  - Eupetinus
  - Gonioryctus
  - Goniothorax
  - Haptoncus
  - Kateretes
  - Nesapterus
  - Nesopetinus
  - Notopeplus
  - Orthostolus
  - Stelidota
  - Urophorus

The former sap beetle subfamily Cybocephalinae is nowadays usually considered a distinct family Cybocephalidae.
