= A. fuscus =

A. fuscus may refer to:

- Abacetus fuscus, a ground beetle
- Acanthoclinus fuscus, the olive rockfish, found in New Zealand
- Acanthogethes fuscus, a sap beetle
- Aconaemys fuscus, the Chilean rock rat
- Acridotheres fuscus, the jungle myna, a bird found in India
- Acrocephalus fuscus, a synonym of Acrocephalus scirpaceus, the common reed warbler, a bird found in Europe and Africa
- Adzhosuchus fuscus, a prehistoric reptile
- Aipysurus fuscus, a sea snake found in the Timor Sea
- Alampyris fuscus, a synonym of Alampyris fusca, a longhorn beetle found in Costa Rica
- Anabazenops fuscus, the white-collared foliage-gleaner, a bird found in Brazil
- Ancharius fuscus, a catfish found in Madagascar
  - Arius fuscus, a synonym of Ancharius fuscus
- Anthrenus fuscus, a carpet beetle found in North America and Europe
- Aplonis fuscus, a synonym of Aplonis fusca, the Tasman starling, an extinct bird
- Apsilus fuscus, the African forktail snapper, a fish found in the eastern Atlantic Ocean
- Arion fuscus, a land slug found in Europe
- Aroegas fuscus, the brown false shieldback, a katydid found in South Africa
- Artamus fuscus, the ashy woodswallow, a bird found in south Asia
- Atrosalarias fuscus, a fish found in the Indian Ocean
- Auriculibuller fuscus, a synonym of Papiliotrema bandonii, a fungus
