= Fabogethes nigrescens =

Scientific classification
- Domain: Eukaryota
- Kingdom: Animalia
- Phylum: Arthropoda
- Class: Insecta
- Order: Coleoptera
- Suborder: Polyphaga
- Infraorder: Cucujiformia
- Family: Nitidulidae
- Genus: Fabogethes
- Species: F. nigrescens

Binomial name
- Fabogethes nigrescens (Stephens, 1830)

Synonyms
- Meligethes circularis J. Sahlberg, 1903; Meligethes funebris Foerster, 1849; Meligethes nigrescens Stephens, 1830; Meligethes picipes Sturm, 1845; Meligethes saulcyi Reitter, 1872; Meligethes seminulum LeConte, 1857; Meligethes subsimilis Rey, 1889; Meligethes xanthoceros Stephens, 1830

Species of beetle

Fabogethes nigrescens, the black pollen beetle, is a species of pollen beetle in the family Nitidulidae. It is found in Africa, Europe and Northern Asia (excluding China), and North America.
