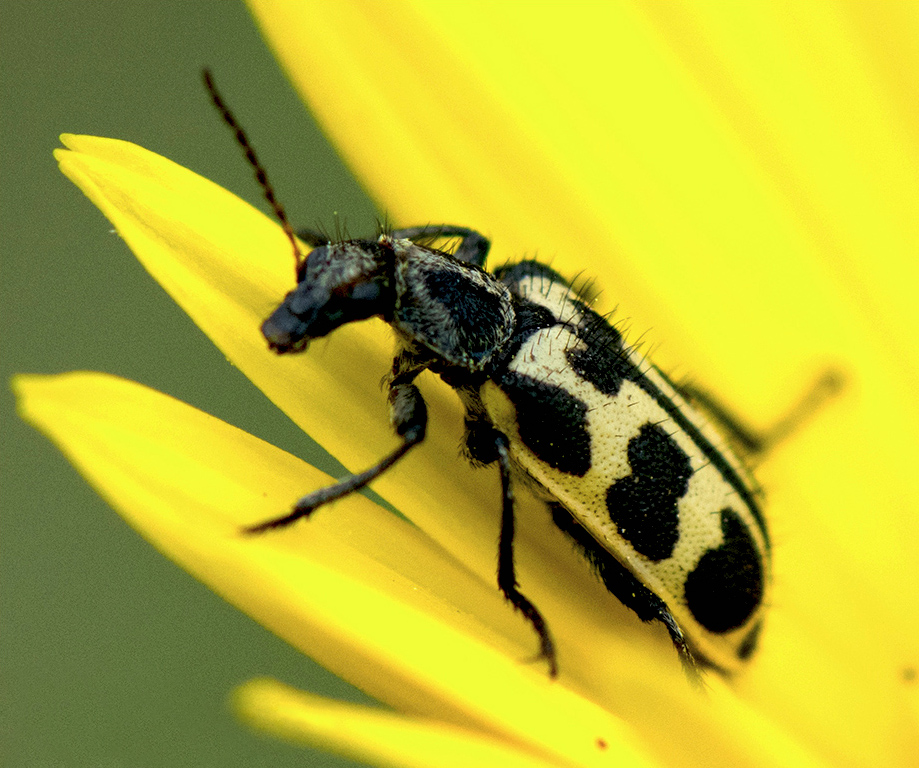
- Astylus atromaculatus

Scientific classification
- Kingdom: Animalia
- Phylum: Arthropoda
- Clade: Pancrustacea
- Class: Insecta
- Order: Coleoptera
- Suborder: Polyphaga
- Infraorder: Cucujiformia
- Family: Melyridae
- Subfamily: Melyrinae; Leach, 1815

= Melyrinae =

Melyrinae is a subfamily of beetles in the family Melyridae. It was first described in 1815 by Leach. It has 6 genera, 29 accepted species, and 4 provisionally accepted species.

== Genera ==
- Arthrobrachus
- Astylus
- Cerallini
- Melyrini
- Amelyris
- †Sinomelyris
