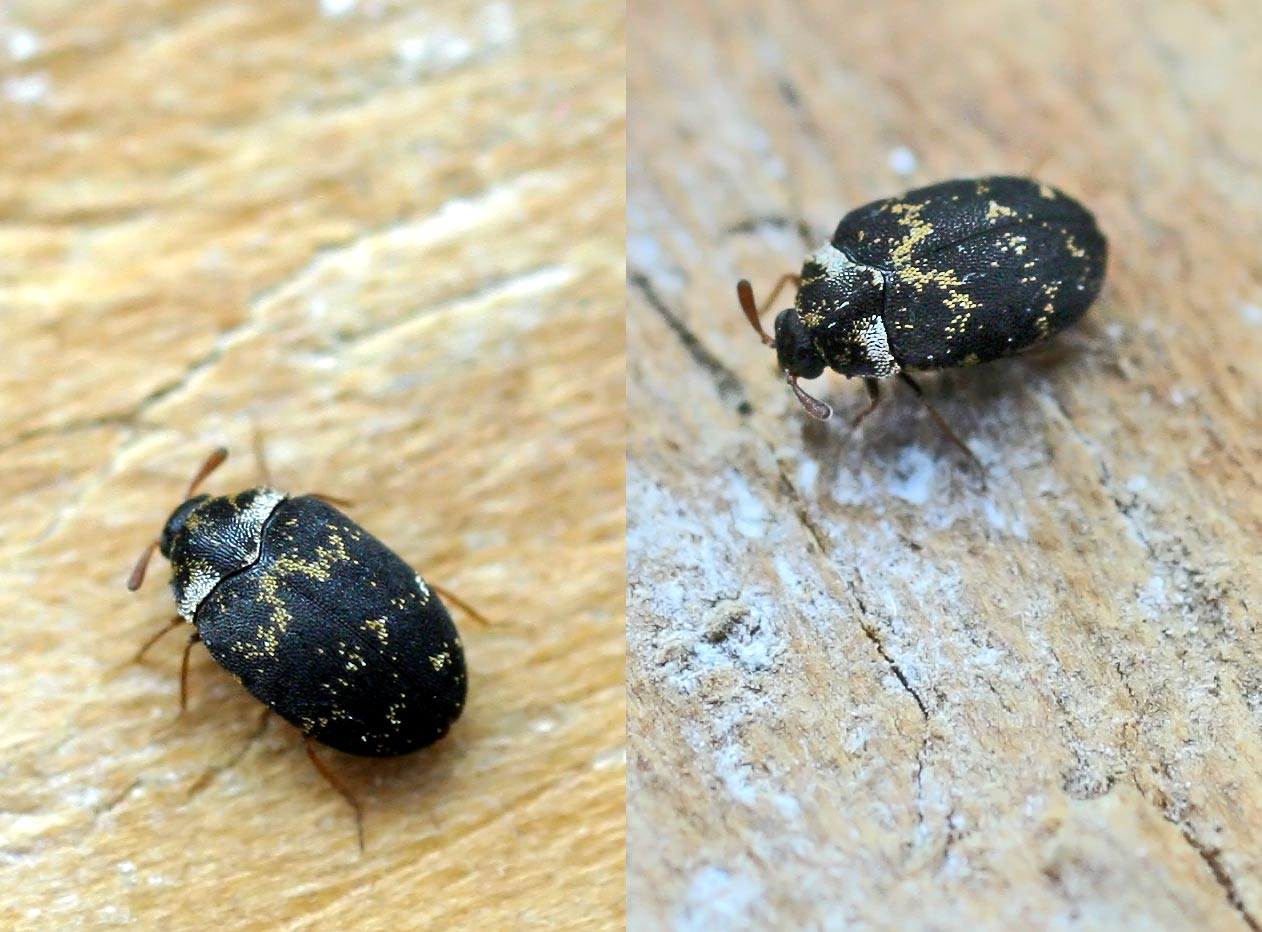
- Anthrenus fuscus, a common species from the subgenus

Scientific classification
- Domain: Eukaryota
- Kingdom: Animalia
- Phylum: Arthropoda
- Class: Insecta
- Order: Coleoptera
- Suborder: Polyphaga
- Family: Dermestidae
- Genus: Anthrenus
- Subgenus: Helocerus; Mulsant & Rey, 1868

Species
- See text.

= Helocerus =

Subgenus of beetles

Helocerus is a subgenus of the genus Anthrenus of the subfamily Megatominae within the family of skin beetles. Subgenus is distinguished by antennae with 5 segments (sometimes 6 in females).

== Species ==
According to World Dermestidae catalogue, these species currently belong to subgenus Helocerus:

- Anthrenus cechovskyi (Háva & Kadej, 2015) – Nepal
- Anthrenus fuscus (Olivier, 1789) – Europe; North America (Canada, United States); Laos; Russia; Saudi Arabia; Morocco; Japan (Bonin Is.); Introduced to Indonesia (Sumatra); St. Helena Islands
- Anthrenus minutus (Erichson, 1846) – Corsica; Portugal; Sardinia; Spain. Introduced to Sudan
- Anthrenus polonicus (Mroczkowski, 1951) – Belarus; Bulgaria; Czech Republic; Slovakia; "Yugoslavia"; United Kingdom; Estonia; Germany; Hungary; Latvia; Russia (Astrakhan, Dagestan, Krasnodar, Stavropol, Ural); Ukraine;
