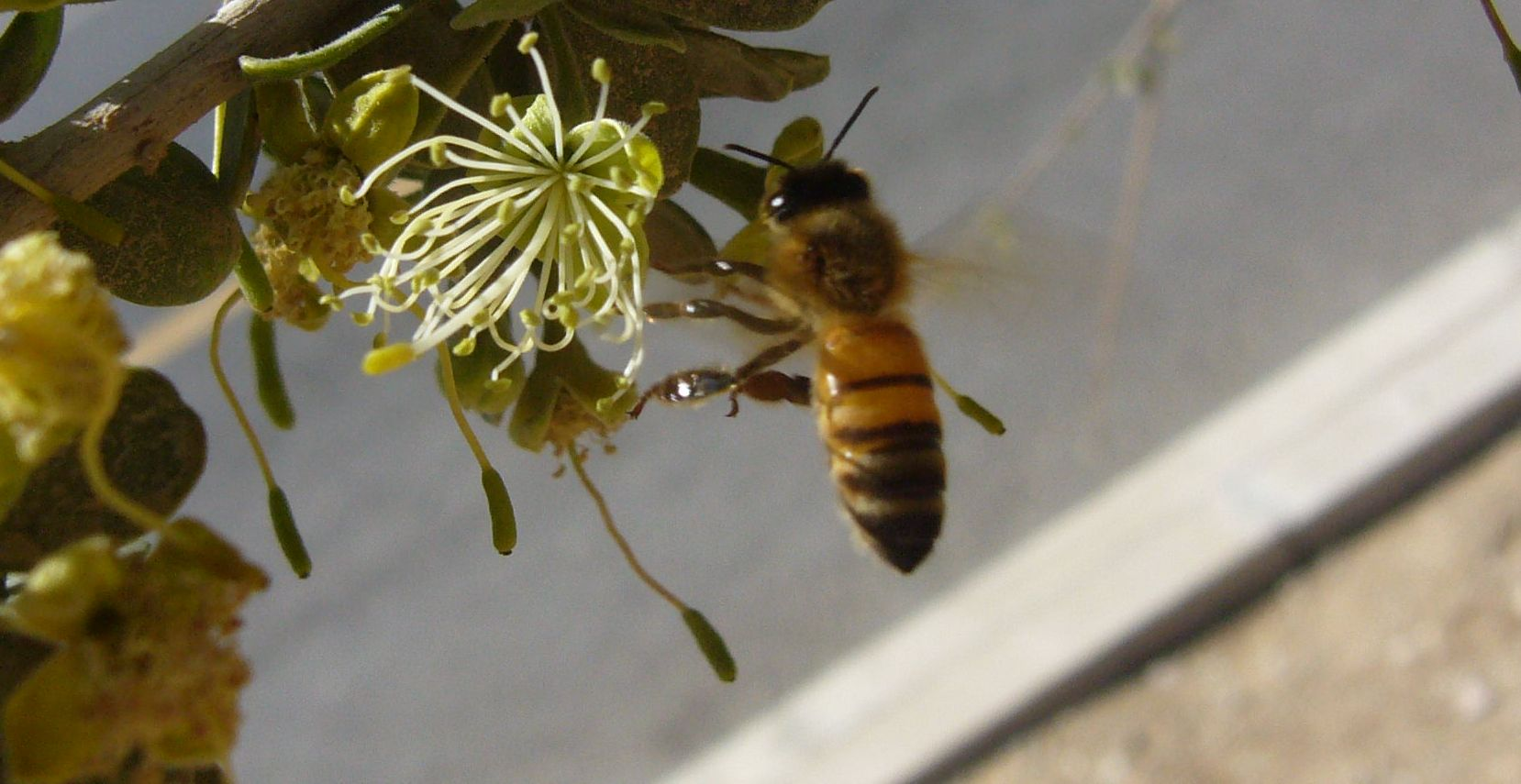

Scientific classification
- Kingdom: Animalia
- Phylum: Arthropoda
- Clade: Pancrustacea
- Class: Insecta
- Order: Hymenoptera
- Family: Apidae
- Genus: Apis
- Species: A. mellifera
- Subspecies: A. m. syriaca

Trinomial name
- Apis mellifera syriaca Skorikov 1929

Synonyms
- Apis mellifica unicolor variety syriaca (Buttel-Reepen 1906); Apis syriaca (Skorikov 1929); Apis mellifera siriaca (Kerr and Amaral 1960)

= Apis mellifera syriaca =

Subspecies of honey bee

Apis mellifera syriaca is known by the common name of the Syrian honey bee, sometimes also called the Palestine honey bee.

It occurs from northern Syria, through Lebanon and to Palestine, or southern Israel into the Negev desert and extending past the Jordan Valley into Jordan.

It has been claimed that the A. m. syriaca has adaptions to deal with attacks from Vespa orientalis and Merops orientalis by remaining within the hive to avoid predation, also its colonies are usually free of the pollen beetle Cryptophagus hexagonalis when compared to Apis mellifera ligustica colonies in the same area.

In a 2013 study they were shown to have a comparable hygienic behavior (which if sufficient can result in Varroa destructor resistance) with descendants of Apis mellifera carnica bees from Europe.

The A. m. syriaca characteristics have been reported to include higher levels of aggression, reduced brood rearing during the hottest months, frequent absconding, as well as excessive production of swarm cells, but with the unusual habit of maintaining multiple virgin queens within a colony in which the reigning queen has left, until a new virgin is successfully mated, thus reducing the risk of the colony becoming queenless. Their reported very low honey yields, along with their higher levels of aggression and significant swarmyness, make them unsuited to modern beekeeping. As a result, mainly A. m. ligustica but also A. m. carnica queens are regularly imported into the region.

Genetic analysis conducted on honey bees collected from multiple locations in Jordan, showed that the bees were all A. m. syriaca, with no detectable introgression from European subspecies, even from hives in which A. m. syriaca and A. m. ligustica were kept within the same area. The authors were unable to explain the apparent lack of hybridization.
