= Brassicogethes simplipes =

Scientific classification
- Domain: Eukaryota
- Kingdom: Animalia
- Phylum: Arthropoda
- Class: Insecta
- Order: Coleoptera
- Suborder: Polyphaga
- Infraorder: Cucujiformia
- Family: Nitidulidae
- Genus: Brassicogethes
- Species: B. simplipes

Binomial name
- Brassicogethes simplipes (Easton, 1947)

Synonyms
- Meligethes simplipes Easton, 1947

Species of beetle

Brassicogethes simplipes is a species of pollen beetle in the family Nitidulidae. It is found in North America.
