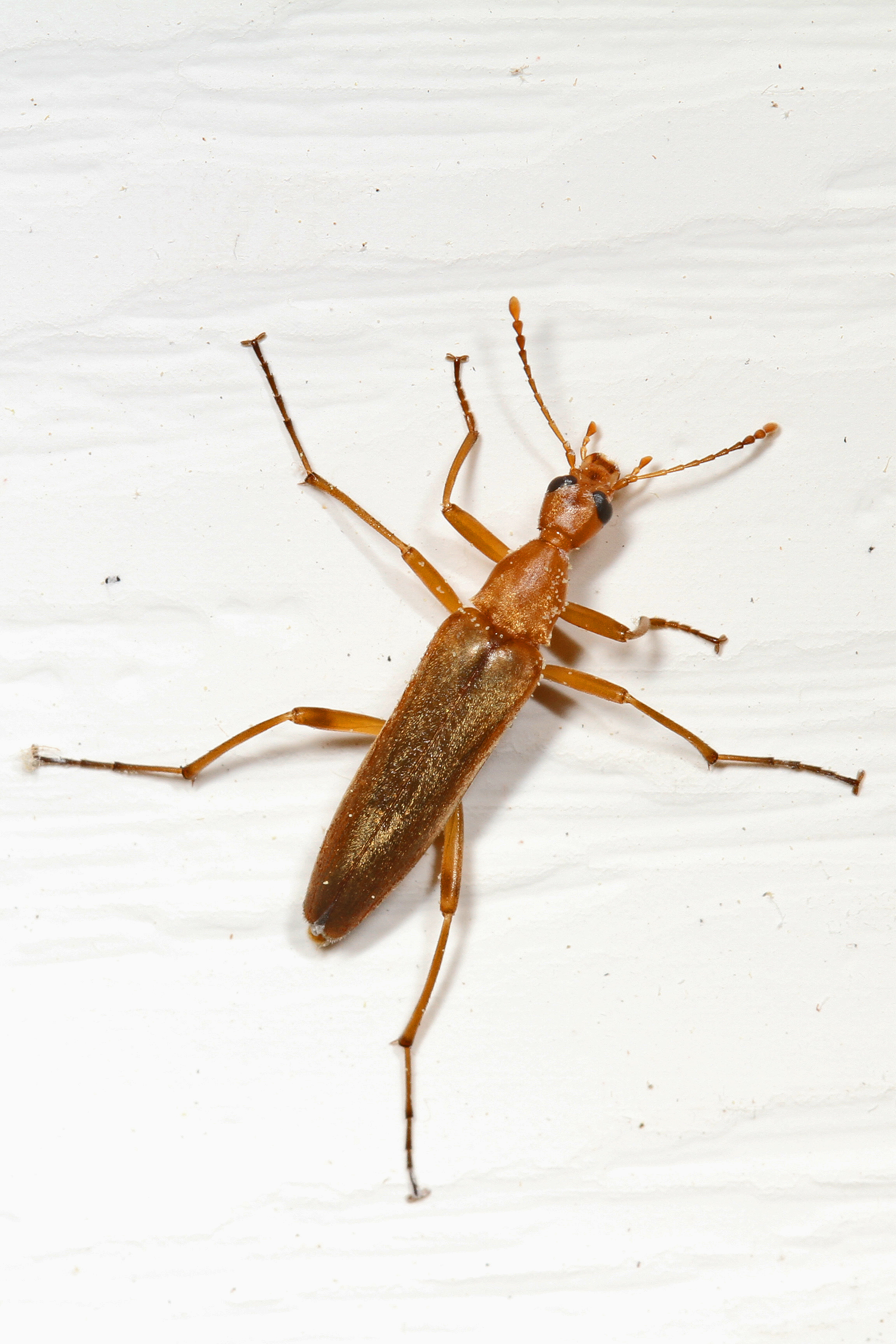

Scientific classification
- Domain: Eukaryota
- Kingdom: Animalia
- Phylum: Arthropoda
- Class: Insecta
- Order: Coleoptera
- Suborder: Polyphaga
- Infraorder: Cucujiformia
- Family: Stenotrachelidae
- Genus: Cephaloon
- Species: C. lepturides

Binomial name
- Cephaloon lepturides Newman, 1838

= Cephaloon lepturides =

Species of beetle

Cephaloon lepturides, the false leptura beetle, is a species of false longhorn beetle in the family Stenotrachelidae. It is found in North America.
