= Brassicogethes cleominis =

Scientific classification
- Domain: Eukaryota
- Kingdom: Animalia
- Phylum: Arthropoda
- Class: Insecta
- Order: Coleoptera
- Suborder: Polyphaga
- Infraorder: Cucujiformia
- Family: Nitidulidae
- Genus: Brassicogethes
- Species: B. cleominis

Binomial name
- Brassicogethes cleominis (Easton, 1959)

Synonyms
- Meligethes cleominis Easton, 1959

Species of beetle

Brassicogethes cleominis is a species of pollen beetle in the family Nitidulidae. It is found in North America.
