= Fabogethes =

Scientific classification
- Domain: Eukaryota
- Kingdom: Animalia
- Phylum: Arthropoda
- Class: Insecta
- Order: Coleoptera
- Suborder: Polyphaga
- Infraorder: Cucujiformia
- Family: Nitidulidae
- Subfamily: Meligethinae
- Genus: Fabogethes; Audisio & Cline, 2009

Genus of beetles

Fabogethes is a genus of pollen beetles in the family Nitidulidae. There are at least two described species in Fabogethes.

== Species ==
These two species belong to the genus Fabogethes:

- Fabogethes nigrescens (Stephens, 1830) (black pollen beetle)
- Fabogethes opacus (Rosenhauer, 1856)
