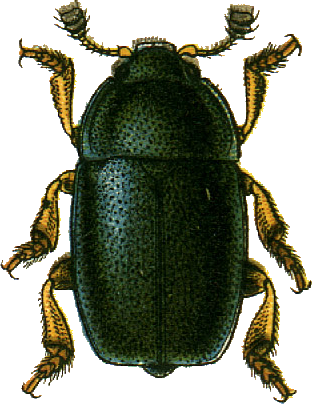

Scientific classification
- Kingdom: Animalia
- Phylum: Arthropoda
- Class: Insecta
- Order: Coleoptera
- Suborder: Polyphaga
- Infraorder: Cucujiformia
- Family: Nitidulidae
- Genus: Brassicogethes
- Species: B. viridescens

Binomial name
- Brassicogethes viridescens (Fabricius, 1787)

= Brassicogethes viridescens =

Species of beetle

Brassicogethes viridescens is a species of pollen beetle in the family Nitidulidae. It is found in Africa, Europe, northern Asia (excluding China), and North America.

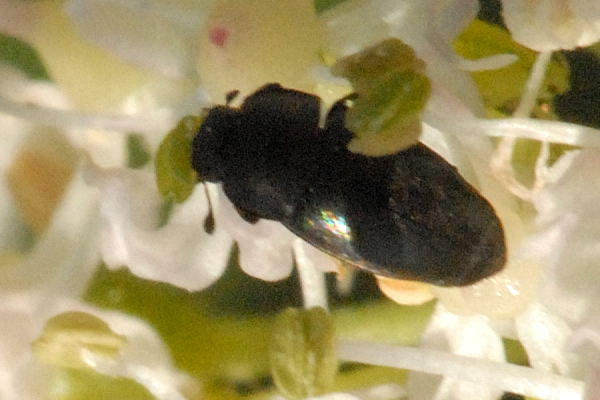
