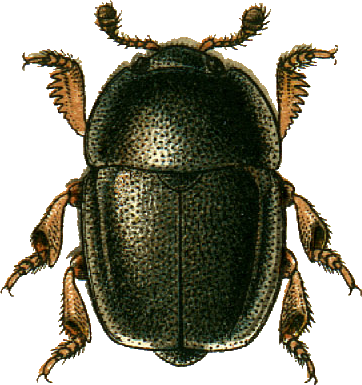

Scientific classification
- Kingdom: Animalia
- Phylum: Arthropoda
- Class: Insecta
- Order: Coleoptera
- Suborder: Polyphaga
- Infraorder: Cucujiformia
- Family: Nitidulidae
- Subfamily: Meligethinae
- Genus: Acanthogethes; Reitter, 1871

= Acanthogethes =

Genus of beetles

Acanthogethes is a genus of pollen beetles in the family Nitidulidae. There are about five described species in Acanthogethes.

== Species ==
These five species belong to the genus Acanthogethes:

- Acanthogethes brevis Sturm, 1845
- Acanthogethes fuscus (Olivier, 1790)
- Acanthogethes hercules (Audisio, 1986)
- Acanthogethes lamii (Rosenhauer, 1856)
- Acanthogethes reyi (Guillebeau, 1885)
