= Anelpistus canadensis =

Scientific classification
- Domain: Eukaryota
- Kingdom: Animalia
- Phylum: Arthropoda
- Class: Insecta
- Order: Coleoptera
- Suborder: Polyphaga
- Infraorder: Cucujiformia
- Family: Stenotrachelidae
- Genus: Anelpistus
- Species: A. canadensis

Binomial name
- Anelpistus canadensis Mank, 1942

Species of beetle

Anelpistus canadensis is a species of false longhorn beetle in the family Stenotrachelidae. It is found in North America.
