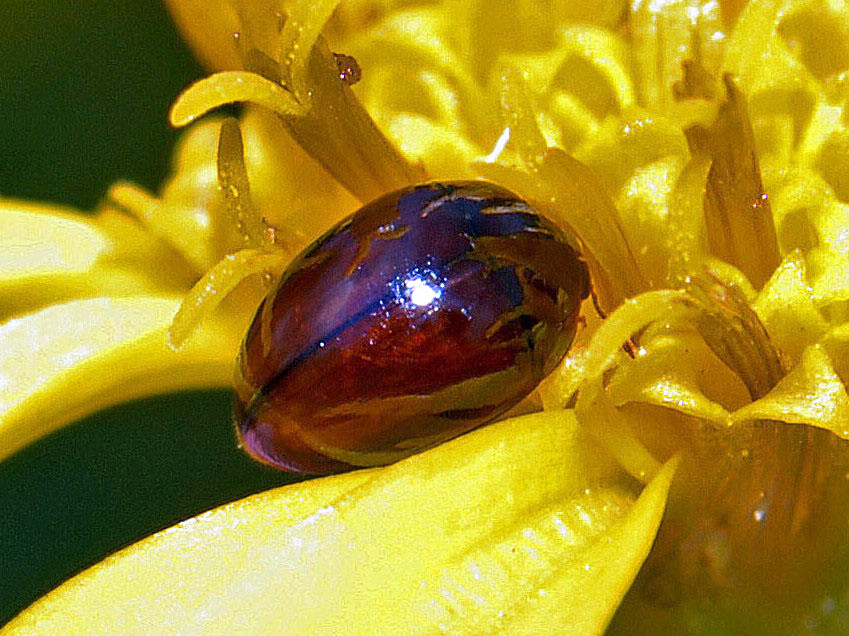

Scientific classification
- Kingdom: Animalia
- Phylum: Arthropoda
- Clade: Pancrustacea
- Class: Insecta
- Order: Coleoptera
- Suborder: Polyphaga
- Infraorder: Cucujiformia
- Family: Phalacridae
- Genus: Stilbus
- Species: S. testaceus

Binomial name
- Stilbus testaceus (Panzer, 1797)

Synonyms
- Anisotoma testaceus Panzer, 1797

= Stilbus testaceus =

Species of beetle

Stilbus testaceus is a species of beetle commonly called shining flower beetle belonging to the family Phalacridae.

== Distribution ==
This rather common species is present in most of Europe and in the Afrotropical realm.

== Habitat ==
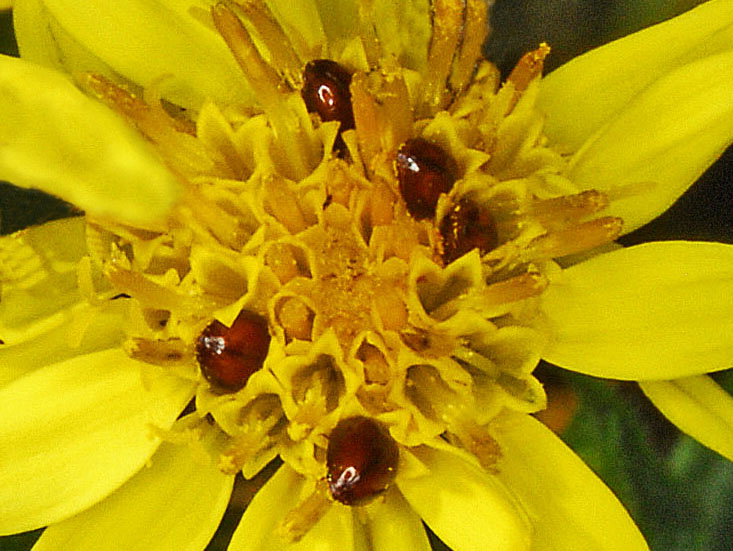
Stilbus testaceus feeding on a flower of Dittrichia viscosa

These beetles can be found in meadows and forest edges, on flowers, on dry grass and hay, in moss and dead leaves.

== Description ==
Stilbus testaceus can reach a length of 1.8–2.3 millimetres (0.071–0.091 in). These tiny beetles have a spherical-oval brownish body, with a yellowish- reddish apex of the elytra. Head and pronotum are dark. The hind angles of the pronotum are sharp, right-angled.

== Biology ==
Adults can be found from May to October on flowering grasses, while in winter they rest under fallen leaves and among the mosses.
