= Afrogethes saevus =

Scientific classification
- Domain: Eukaryota
- Kingdom: Animalia
- Phylum: Arthropoda
- Class: Insecta
- Order: Coleoptera
- Suborder: Polyphaga
- Infraorder: Cucujiformia
- Family: Nitidulidae
- Genus: Afrogethes
- Species: A. saevus

Binomial name
- Afrogethes saevus (LeConte, 1859)

Synonyms
- Meligethes saevus LeConte, 1859

Species of beetle

Afrogethes saevus is a species of pollen beetle in the family Nitidulidae. It is found in North America.
