= Cephaloon tenuicorne =

Scientific classification
- Kingdom: Animalia
- Phylum: Arthropoda
- Class: Insecta
- Order: Coleoptera
- Suborder: Polyphaga
- Infraorder: Cucujiformia
- Family: Stenotrachelidae
- Genus: Cephaloon
- Species: C. tenuicorne

Binomial name
- Cephaloon tenuicorne LeConte, 1874

Species of beetle

Cephaloon tenuicorne is a species of false longhorn beetle in the family Stenotrachelidae. It is found in North America.
