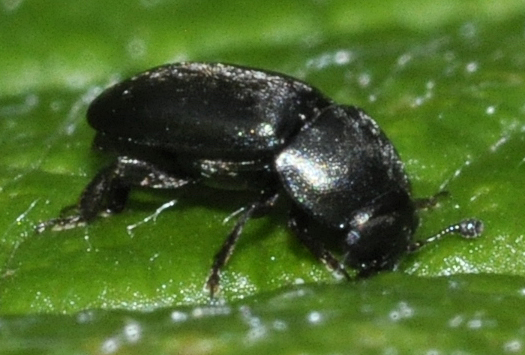

Scientific classification
- Kingdom: Animalia
- Phylum: Arthropoda
- Clade: Pancrustacea
- Class: Insecta
- Order: Coleoptera
- Suborder: Polyphaga
- Infraorder: Cucujiformia
- Family: Nitidulidae
- Genus: Meligethes
- Species: M. atratus

Binomial name
- Meligethes atratus (Olivier, 1790)

Synonyms
- Meligethes rufipes (Marsham, 1802)

= Meligethes atratus =

Species of beetle

Meligethes atratus is a species of pollen beetle in the family Nitidulidae. It is found in Europe and Northern Asia (excluding China).

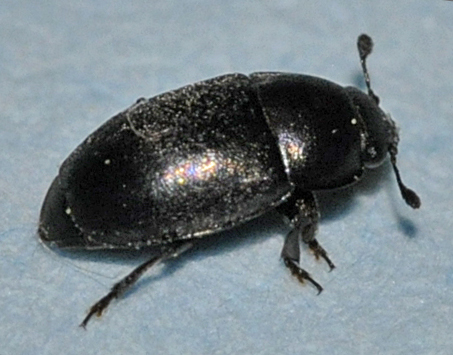

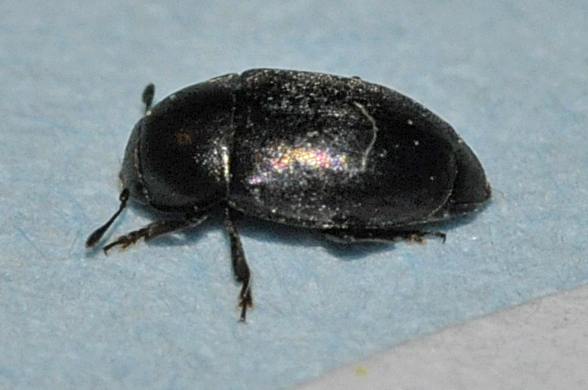
