= Olibrus liquidus =

Scientific classification
- Kingdom: Animalia
- Phylum: Arthropoda
- Class: Insecta
- Order: Coleoptera
- Suborder: Polyphaga
- Infraorder: Cucujiformia
- Family: Phalacridae
- Genus: Olibrus
- Species: O. liquidus

Binomial name
- Olibrus liquidus Erichson, 1845

Species of beetle

Olibrus liquidus is a beetle species of the Phalacridae family.

== Characteristics ==
=== Environment ===
Olibrus liquidus is found in Europe, North Africa and British Columbia, in Canada. Olibrus liquidus prefer dry and warm locations. This species feeds on Asteraceae flowers.

=== Physical characteristics ===
The length of the dark brown and oval body is between 1.9 and 2.6 mm and its legs are colored in yellow and brown.
