= Nesiotus =

Scientific classification
- Domain: Eukaryota
- Kingdom: Animalia
- Phylum: Arthropoda
- Class: Insecta
- Order: Coleoptera
- Suborder: Polyphaga
- Infraorder: Cucujiformia
- Family: Phalacridae
- Genus: Nesiotus; Guillebau, 1896

Genus of beetles

Nesiotus is a genus of beetles belonging to the family Phalacridae.

Species:

- Nesiotus olibroides Guillebeau, 1896
- Nesiotus similis Scott, 1922
