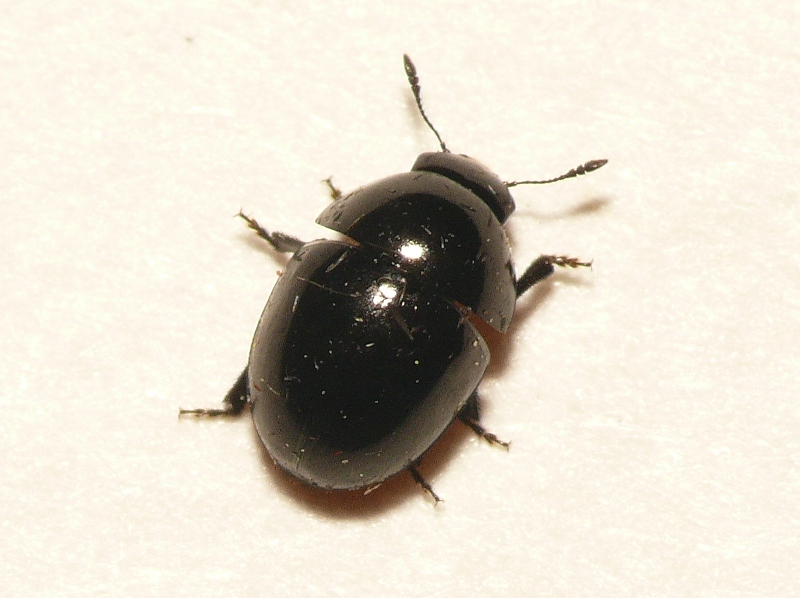
- Phalacrus Fimetarius

Scientific classification
- Kingdom: Animalia
- Phylum: Arthropoda
- Clade: Pancrustacea
- Class: Insecta
- Order: Coleoptera
- Suborder: Polyphaga
- Infraorder: Cucujiformia
- Family: Phalacridae
- Genus: Phalacrus; Paykull, 1800

= Phalacrus (beetle) =

Genus of beetles

Phalacrus is a genus of beetles belonging to the family Phalacridae.

The genus has almost cosmopolitan distribution.

Species:

- Phalacrus apicalis Melsheimer, 1845
- Phalacrus arizonicus Casey
