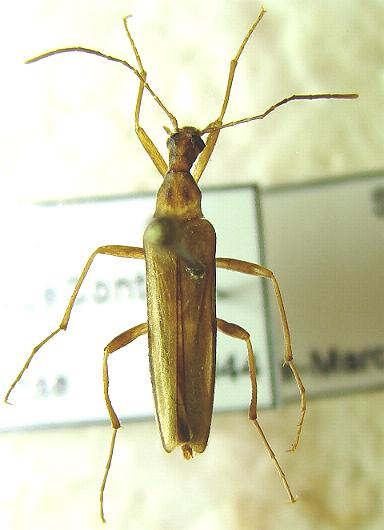

Scientific classification
- Kingdom: Animalia
- Phylum: Arthropoda
- Class: Insecta
- Order: Coleoptera
- Suborder: Polyphaga
- Infraorder: Cucujiformia
- Family: Stenotrachelidae
- Genus: Cephaloon
- Species: C. ungulare

Binomial name
- Cephaloon ungulare LeConte, 1874

= Cephaloon ungulare =

Species of beetle

Cephaloon ungulare is a species of false longhorn beetle in the family Stenotrachelidae. It is found in North America.
