= Afrogethes =

Scientific classification
- Domain: Eukaryota
- Kingdom: Animalia
- Phylum: Arthropoda
- Class: Insecta
- Order: Coleoptera
- Suborder: Polyphaga
- Infraorder: Cucujiformia
- Family: Nitidulidae
- Subfamily: Meligethinae
- Genus: Afrogethes

Genus of beetles

Afrogethes is a genus of pollen beetles in the family Nitidulidae. There are at least 2 described species in Afrogethes.

== Species ==
- Afrogethes canadensis (Easton, 1955)
- Afrogethes saevus (LeConte, 1859)
