= Alampyris cretaria =

Scientific classification
- Domain: Eukaryota
- Kingdom: Animalia
- Phylum: Arthropoda
- Class: Insecta
- Order: Coleoptera
- Suborder: Polyphaga
- Infraorder: Cucujiformia
- Family: Cerambycidae
- Tribe: Hemilophini
- Genus: Alampyris
- Species: A. cretaria

Binomial name
- Alampyris cretaria Bates, 1885

Species of beetle

Alampyris cretaria is a species of beetle in the family Cerambycidae. It was described by Henry Walter Bates in 1885. It is known from Mexico.
