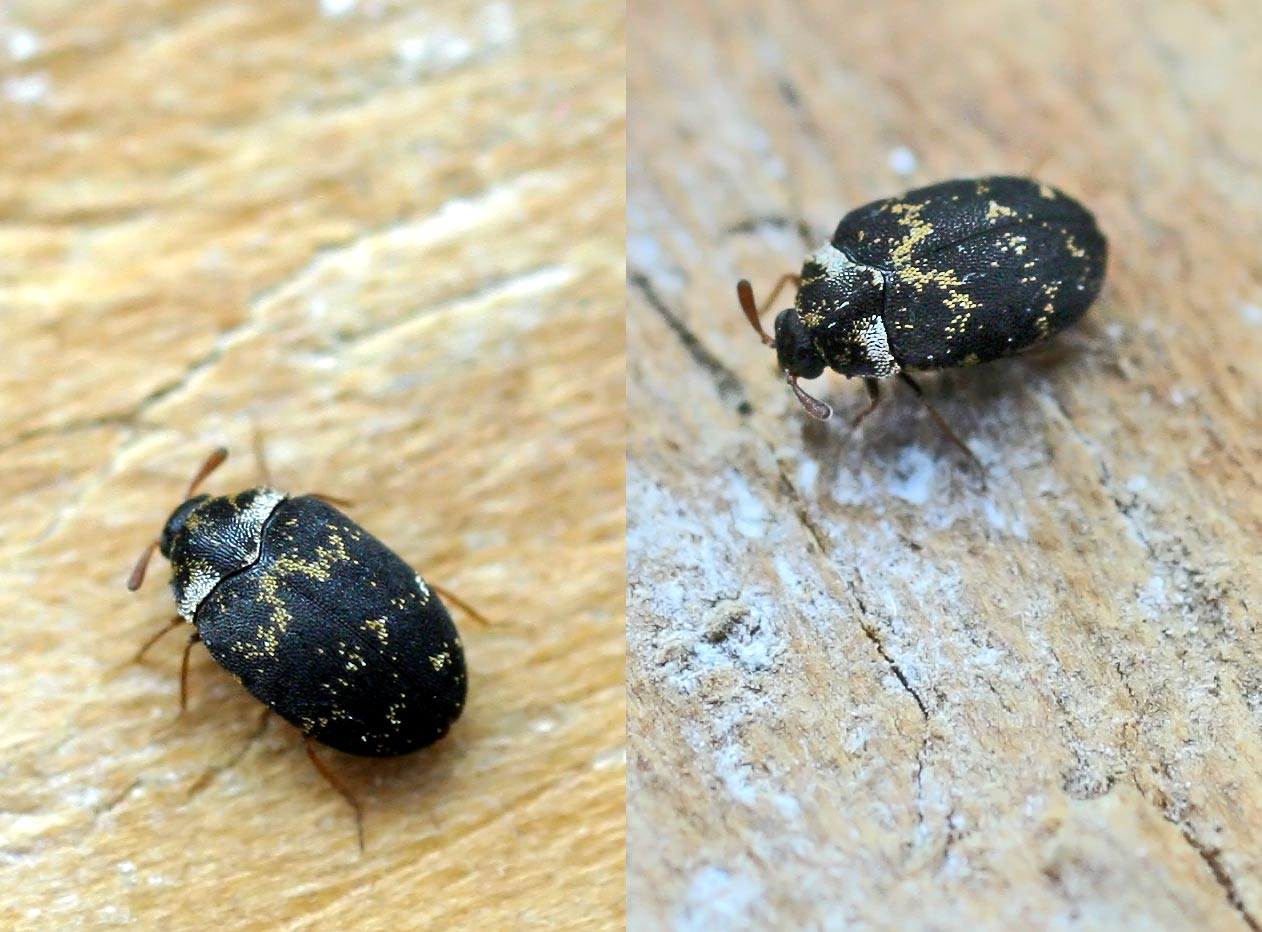

Scientific classification
- Kingdom: Animalia
- Phylum: Arthropoda
- Clade: Pancrustacea
- Class: Insecta
- Order: Coleoptera
- Suborder: Polyphaga
- Family: Dermestidae
- Genus: Anthrenus
- Species: A. fuscus

Binomial name
- Anthrenus fuscus Olivier, 1789

= Anthrenus fuscus =

Species of beetle

Anthrenus fuscus is a species of carpet beetle in the family Dermestidae. It is found in North America and Europe.

== See also ==
- Anthrenus museorum, commonly confused species

Other Helocerus species known with similar appearance and overlapping distribution range:

- Anthrenus polonicus, European species
- Anthrenus minutus, known from Portugal and Spain
