= Stenotrachelus =

Scientific classification
- Kingdom: Animalia
- Phylum: Arthropoda
- Class: Insecta
- Order: Coleoptera
- Suborder: Polyphaga
- Infraorder: Cucujiformia
- Family: Stenotrachelidae
- Genus: Stenotrachelus; Latreille, 1825
- Species: S. aeneus

Binomial name
- Stenotrachelus aeneus (Paykull, 1799)

Synonyms
- Dryops aeneus Paykull, 1799

Genus of beetles

Stenotrachelus is a genus of false longhorn beetles in the family Stenotrachelidae. There is one described species in Stenotrachelus, S. aeneus.
