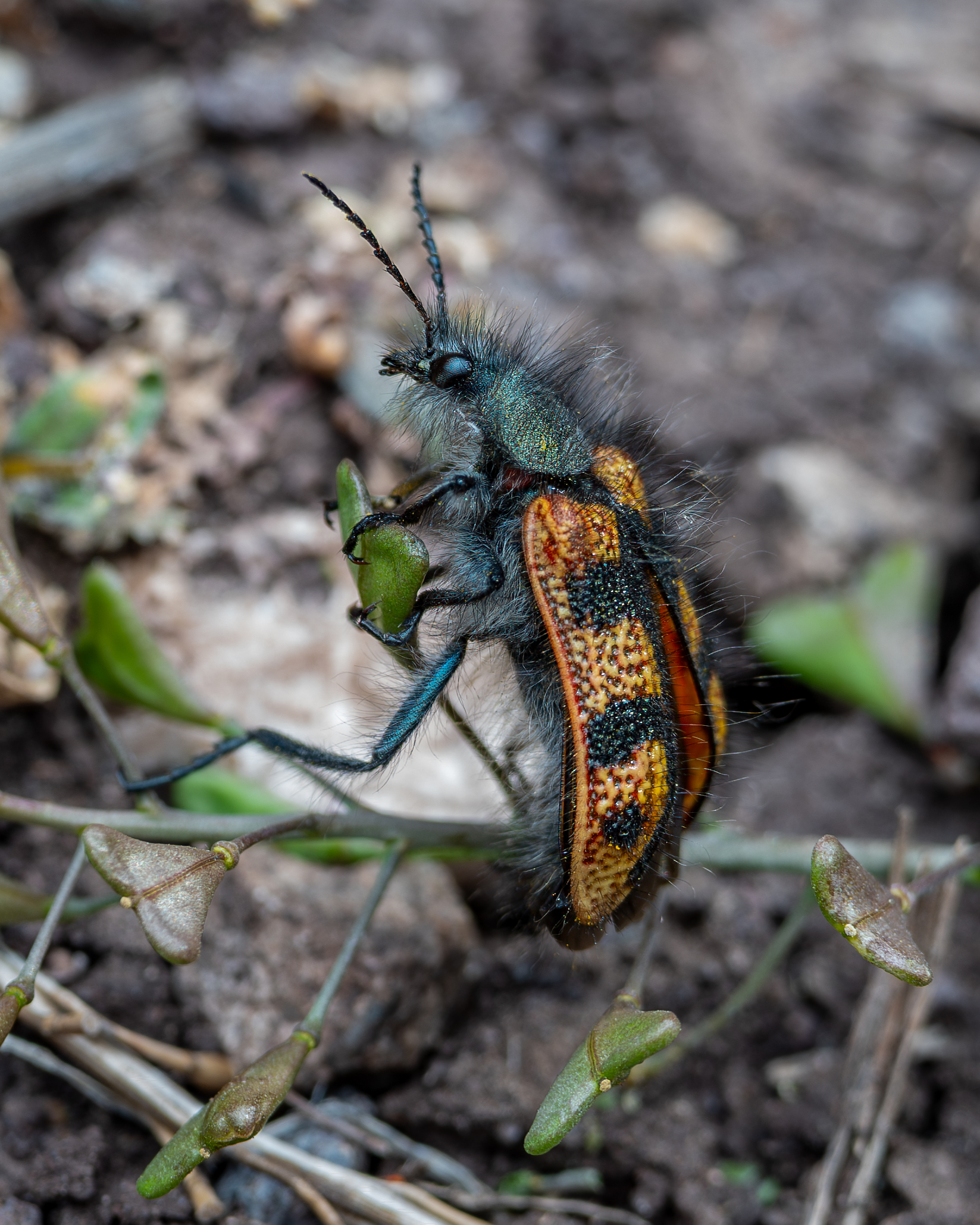

Scientific classification
- Kingdom: Animalia
- Phylum: Arthropoda
- Clade: Pancrustacea
- Class: Insecta
- Order: Coleoptera
- Suborder: Polyphaga
- Infraorder: Cucujiformia
- Family: Melyridae
- Genus: Astylus
- Species: A. trifasciatus

Binomial name
- Astylus trifasciatus (Guérin-Méneville, 1844)

= Astylus trifasciatus =

Species of beetle

Astylus trifasciatus (Spanish: pololo común) is a species of beetles native to Chile. Adult specimens are approximately 1.5 cm (0.59 in) in length. They have orange-colored elytra with a black stripe down the center bisecting the insect and two black stripes trisecting the wing shells. They feed on flowering plants, and are known to forage pollen from the orchid Bipinnula fimbriata.
