= Anelpistus =

Scientific classification
- Domain: Eukaryota
- Kingdom: Animalia
- Phylum: Arthropoda
- Class: Insecta
- Order: Coleoptera
- Suborder: Polyphaga
- Infraorder: Cucujiformia
- Family: Stenotrachelidae
- Subfamily: Stenotrachelinae
- Genus: Anelpistus; Horn, 1870

Genus of beetles

Anelpistus is a genus of false longhorn beetles in the family Stenotrachelidae. There are at least two described species in Anelpistus.

== Species ==
These two species belong to the genus Anelpistus:

- Anelpistus americanus Horn, 1870
- Anelpistus canadensis Mank, 1942
