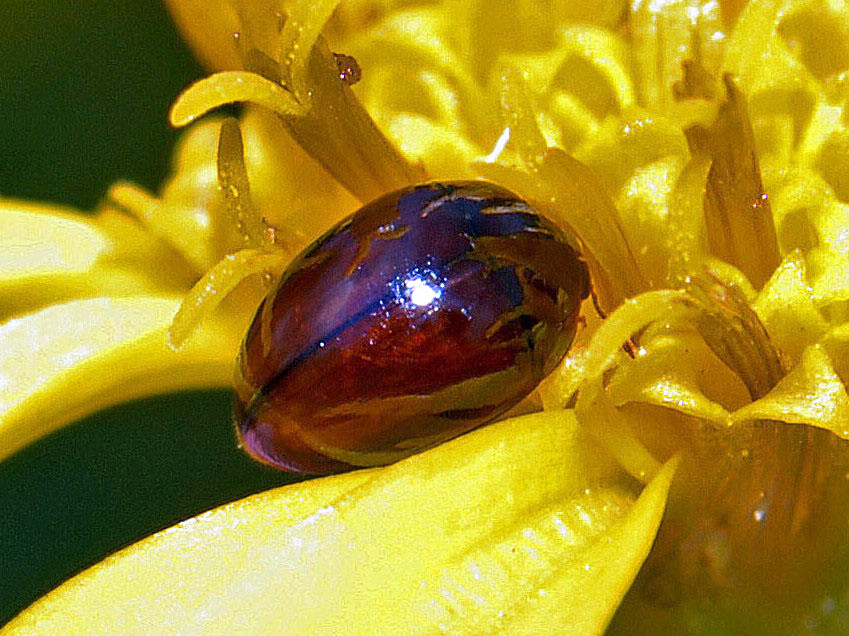
- Stilbus testaceus

Scientific classification
- Kingdom: Animalia
- Phylum: Arthropoda
- Class: Insecta
- Order: Coleoptera
- Suborder: Polyphaga
- Infraorder: Cucujiformia
- Family: Phalacridae
- Genus: Stilbus; Seidlitz, 1872

= Stilbus =

Genus of beetles

Stilbus is a genus of beetles commonly called the shining flower beetles belonging to the family Phalacridae.

== Species ==
Species within this genus include:

- Stilbus abbreviatus Casey, 1916
- Stilbus aequalis (Sharp, 1888)
- Stilbus ambagiosus Lyubarsky, 2003
- Stilbus angulatus Champion, 1925
- Stilbus angulicaput (Scott, 1922)
- Stilbus angustus Casey, 1916
- Stilbus apertus Casey, 1916
- Stilbus apicalis (Melsh.)
- Stilbus apicialis (Melsheimer, 1844)
- Stilbus aquatilis (LeConte, 1856)
- Stilbus atomarius (Linnaeus, 1767)
- Stilbus attenuatus Casey, 1890
- Stilbus avunculus Flach, 1889
- Stilbus belfragei Casey, 1916
- Stilbus bipustulatus Champion, 1925
- Stilbus borealis (Guillebeau, 1894)
- Stilbus brevisternus (Guillebeau, 1893)
- Stilbus cinctus Fauvel, 1903
- Stilbus compactus Lyubarsky, 2003
- Stilbus convergens Casey, 1890
- Stilbus coxalis Svec, 1992
- Stilbus curvolineatus Champion, 1924
- Stilbus daublebskyorum Svec, 2003
- Stilbus dollmani Champion, 1925
- Stilbus ferrugineus Svec, 1992
- Stilbus fidelis Casey, 1916
- Stilbus finitimus Casey, 1916
- Stilbus floridanus Casey, 1890
- Stilbus galvestonicus Casey, 1916
- Stilbus gossypii (Brèthes, 1912)
- Stilbus gracilis (Sharp, 1888)
- Stilbus guillebeaui Hetschko, 1928
- Stilbus japonicus Svec, 1992
- Stilbus koltzei Reitter, 1887
- Stilbus libidinosus Lyubarsky, 2003
- Stilbus limbatus Casey, 1916
- Stilbus ludibundus Casey, 1916
- Stilbus ludovicianus Casey, 1916
- Stilbus merkli Svec, 1992
- Stilbus misellus (Guillebeau, 1894)
- Stilbus modestus Casey, 1890
- Stilbus mollis (Sharp, 1888)
- Stilbus nanulus Casey, 1890
- Stilbus nitidus (Melsheimer, 1844)
- Stilbus notabilis (Fall, 1901)
- Stilbus oblongus (Erichson, 1845)
- Stilbus obscurus Casey, 1890
- Stilbus obtusus (LeConte, 1856)
- Stilbus ochraceus Casey, 1916
- Stilbus olearis Lyubarsky, 2003
- Stilbus orbicularis Lyubarsky, 2003
- Stilbus pallidus Casey, 1890
- Stilbus pannonicus Franz, 1968
- Stilbus placidus (Sharp, 1888)
- Stilbus probatus Casey, 1916
- Stilbus prudens Casey, 1916
- Stilbus pubicoxis (Guillebeau, 1893)
- Stilbus pusillus (LeConte, 1856)
- Stilbus quadrisetosus Casey, 1916
- Stilbus semirufus Guillebeau, 1894
- Stilbus seriatus (Guillebeau, 1894)
- Stilbus sharpi (Guillebeau, 1892)
- Stilbus shastanicus Casey, 1916
- Stilbus simplex Lyubarsky, 1998
- Stilbus sphaericulus Casey, 1916
- Stilbus sternosetosus (Lyubarsky, 1998)
- Stilbus subalutaceus Casey, 1890
- Stilbus sublineatus (Guillebeau, 1894)
- Stilbus substriatus (Guillebeau, 1894)
- Stilbus testaceus (Panzer, 1797)
- Stilbus thoracicus Casey, 1916
- Stilbus trisetosus Casey, 1916
- Stilbus truncatus Svec, 1992
- Stilbus univestis (Guillebeau, 1894)
- Stilbus viduus Casey, 1890
- Stilbus zotti Svec, 2003
