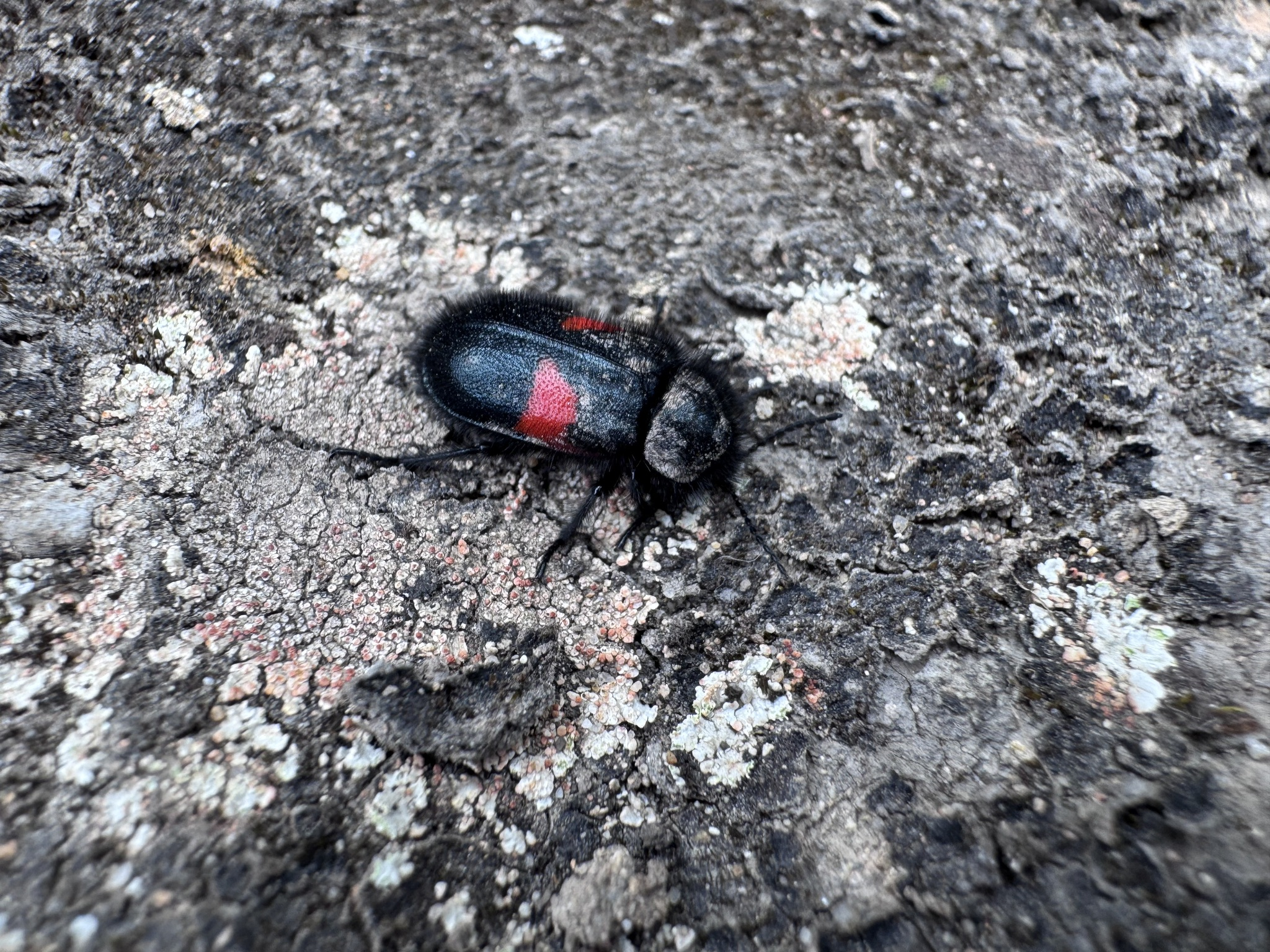
- Astylus aulicus, Colombia

Scientific classification
- Kingdom: Animalia
- Phylum: Arthropoda
- Clade: Pancrustacea
- Class: Insecta
- Order: Coleoptera
- Suborder: Polyphaga
- Infraorder: Cucujiformia
- Family: Melyridae
- Genus: Astylus
- Species: A. aulicus

Binomial name
- Astylus aulicus Dejean, 1837

= Astylus aulicus =

Species of beetle

Astylus aulicus is a species of soft-winged flower beetle in the family Melyridae, found in Central and South America.
