= Alampyris melanophiloides =

Scientific classification
- Domain: Eukaryota
- Kingdom: Animalia
- Phylum: Arthropoda
- Class: Insecta
- Order: Coleoptera
- Suborder: Polyphaga
- Infraorder: Cucujiformia
- Family: Cerambycidae
- Tribe: Hemilophini
- Genus: Alampyris
- Species: A. melanophiloides

Binomial name
- Alampyris melanophiloides (Thomson, 1868)

Synonyms
- Hemilophus melanophiloides Gemminger & Harold, 1873; Pannychis melanophiloides Thomson, 1868; Pannychis melanophilus Thomson, 1878

Species of beetle

Alampyris melanophiloides is a species of beetle in the family Cerambycidae. It was described by Thomson in 1868. It is known from Mexico.
