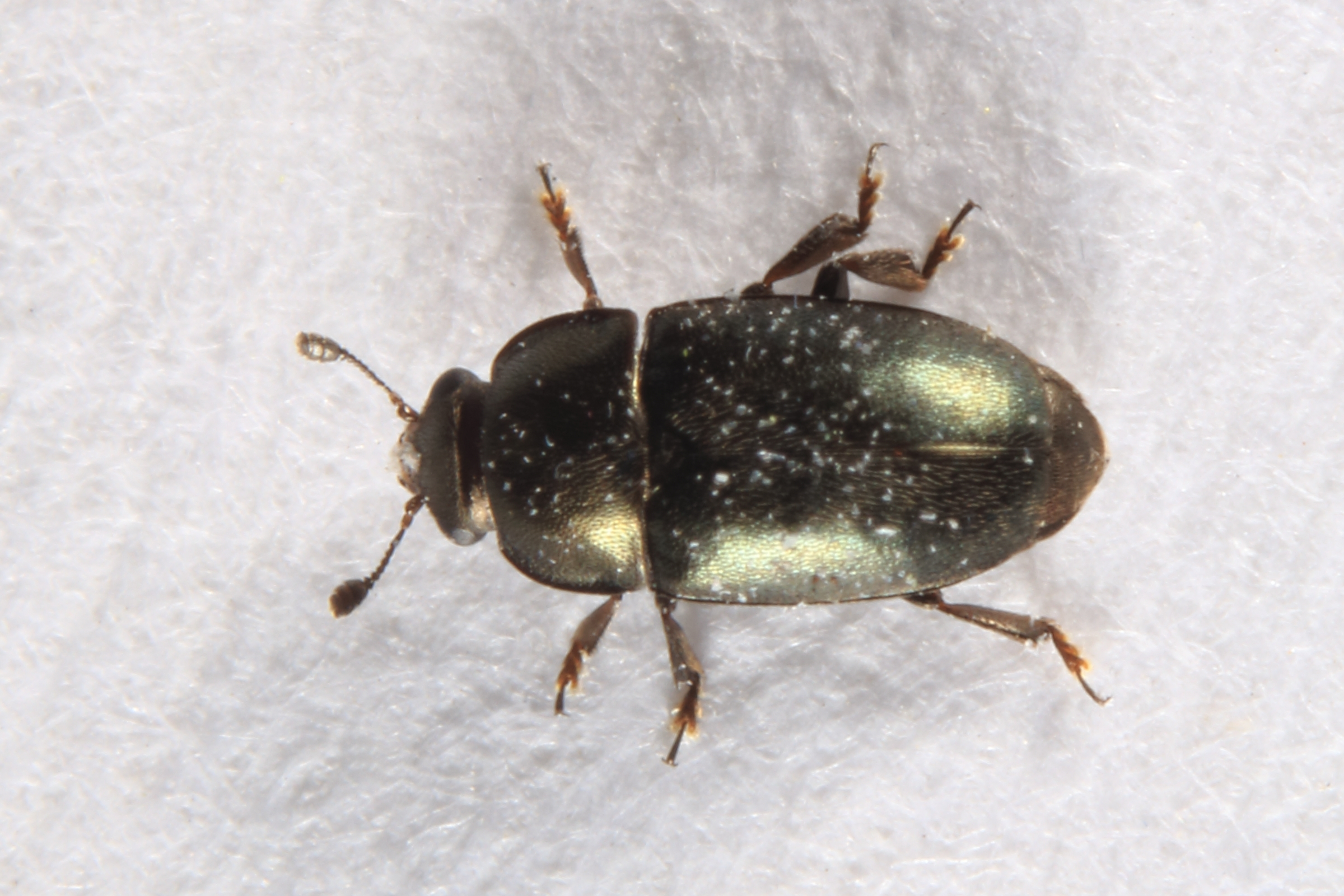
- Brassicogethes aeneus

Scientific classification
- Kingdom: Animalia
- Phylum: Arthropoda
- Class: Insecta
- Order: Coleoptera
- Suborder: Polyphaga
- Infraorder: Cucujiformia
- Family: Nitidulidae
- Subfamily: Meligethinae
- Genus: Brassicogethes; Audisio & Cline, 2009

= Brassicogethes =

Genus of beetles

Brassicogethes is a genus of pollen beetles in the family Nitidulidae.

== Species ==
The following species are recognised in the genus Brassicogethes:

- Brassicogethes aeneus (Fabricius, 1775) - common pollen beetle
- Brassicogethes arankae (Audisio & De Biase, 2005)
- Brassicogethes bithynicus (Audisio, 1988)
- Brassicogethes carpathicus (Audisio, Jelinek & Stevanovic, 1999)
- Brassicogethes cleominis (Easton, 1959)
- Brassicogethes epeirosi (Audisio, Mancini & De Biase, 2006)
- Brassicogethes erysimicola Audisio & De Biase, 2001
- Brassicogethes gracilis (C.Brisout de Barneville, 1863)
- Brassicogethes humerosus (Reitter, 1871)
- Brassicogethes lunariae (Audisio & De Biase, 1999)
- Brassicogethes prometheus (Jelínek, 1982) Jelinek, 1982
- Brassicogethes reitteri (Schilsky, 1894)
- Brassicogethes simplex (Kraatz, 1858)
- Brassicogethes simplipes (Easton, 1947)
- Brassicogethes spornrafti (Audisio, 1977)
- Brassicogethes squamosus (Jelinek & Marek, 1966)
- Brassicogethes thalassophilus (Audisio & De Biase, 2005)
- Brassicogethes viridescens (Fabricius, 1787)
- BOLD:AAC0575 (Brassicogethes sp.)
- BOLD:ABZ3786 (Brassicogethes sp.)
- BOLD:ACF0980 (Brassicogethes sp.)
