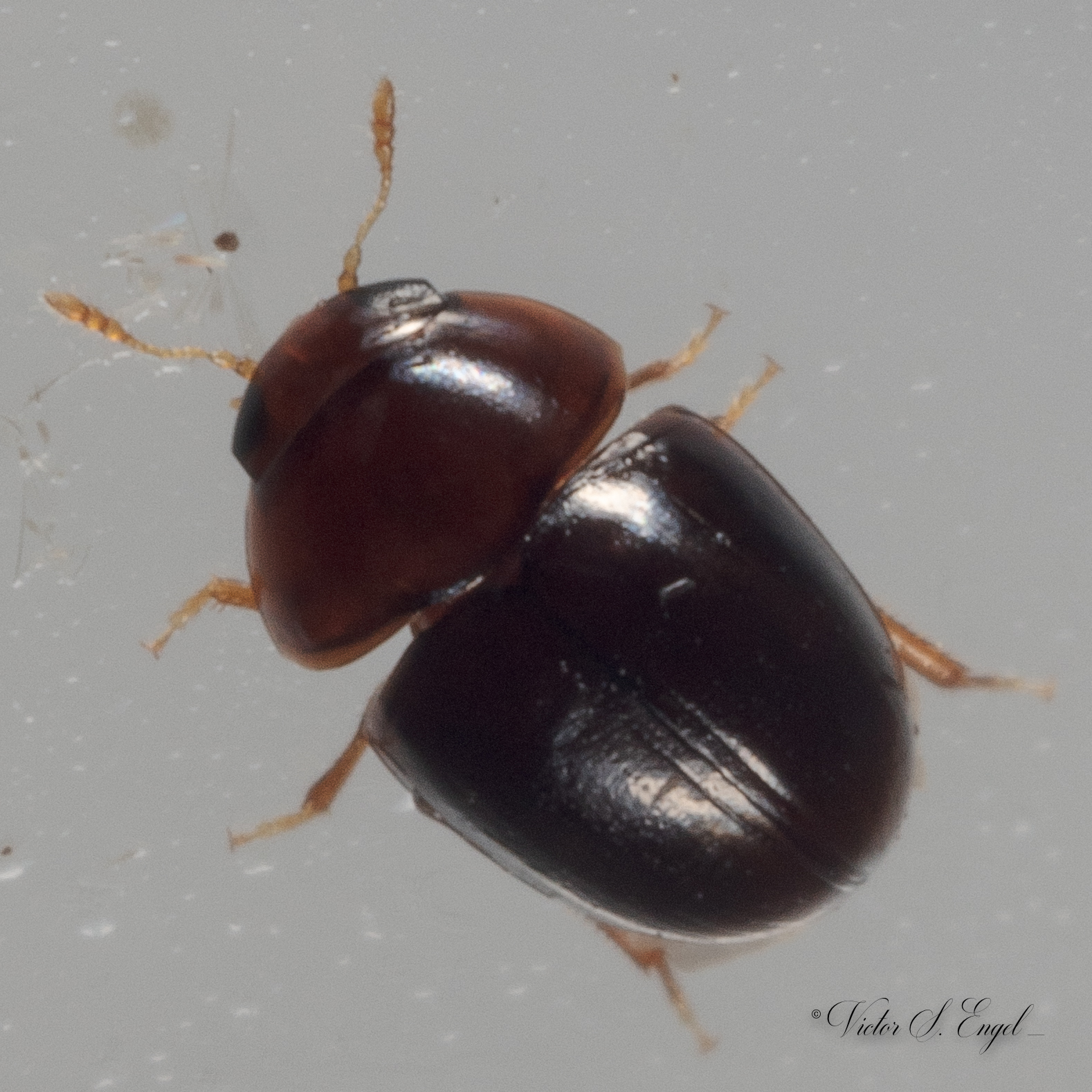
- Acylomus, Texas

Scientific classification
- Domain: Eukaryota
- Kingdom: Animalia
- Phylum: Arthropoda
- Class: Insecta
- Order: Coleoptera
- Suborder: Polyphaga
- Infraorder: Cucujiformia
- Family: Phalacridae
- Genus: Acylomus; Sharp, 1888

Synonyms
- Astenulus Guillebeau, 1896; Coelocoelius Guillebeau, 1893; Tinodemus Guillebeau, 1894

= Acylomus =

Genus of insects

Acylomus is a genus of shining flower beetles in the family Phalacridae. There are about eight described species in Acylomus.

== Species ==
These eight species belong to the genus Acylomus:

- Acylomus aciculatus Sharp, 1889
- Acylomus calcaratus Casey, 1890
- Acylomus ergoti Casey, 1890
- Acylomus insularis Guillebeau, 1896
- Acylomus micropus (Guillebeau, 1896)
- Acylomus polygramma (Flach, 1888)
- Acylomus pugetanus Casey, 1916
- Acylomus tropicus (Scott, 1922)
