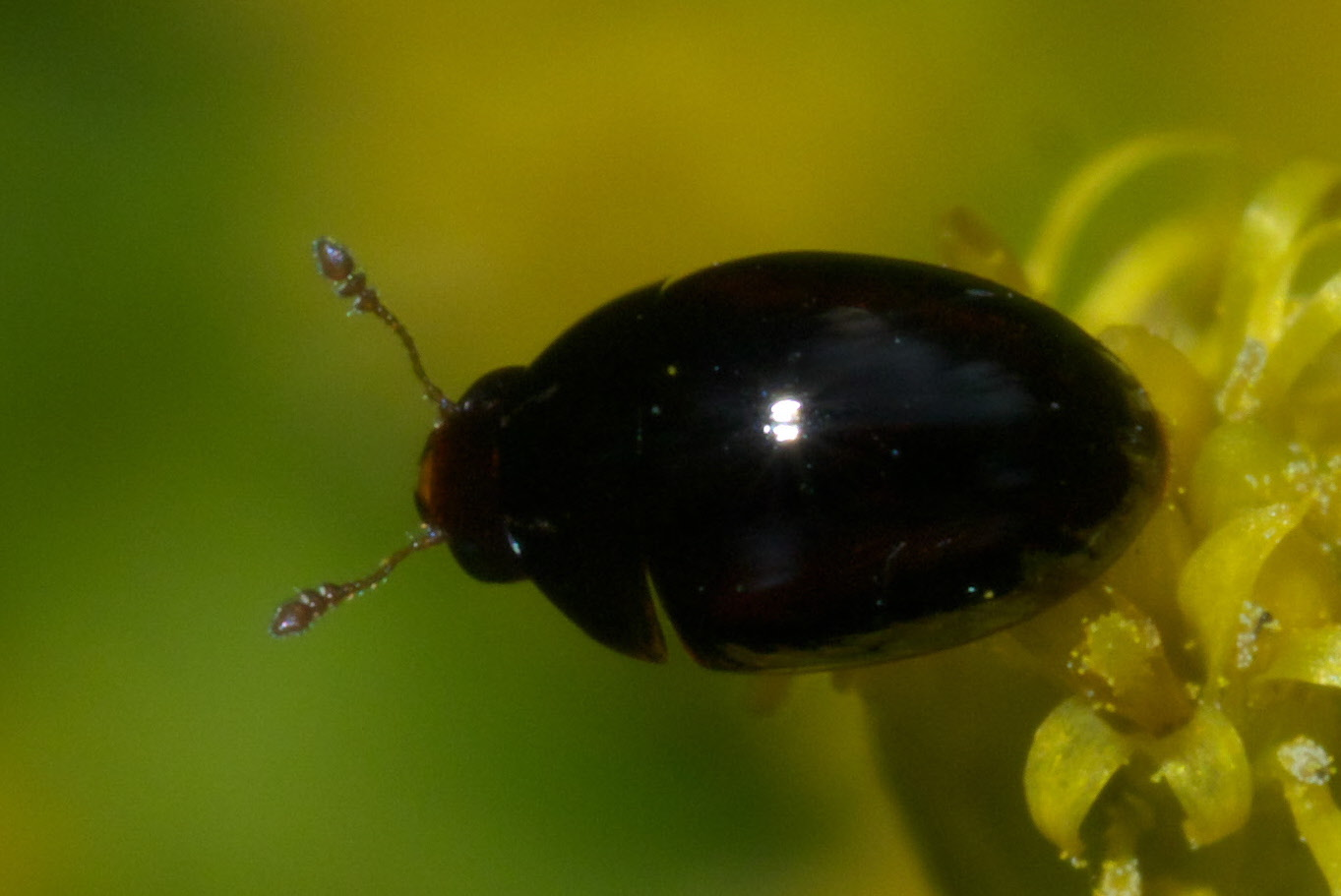

Scientific classification
- Kingdom: Animalia
- Phylum: Arthropoda
- Clade: Pancrustacea
- Class: Insecta
- Order: Coleoptera
- Suborder: Polyphaga
- Infraorder: Cucujiformia
- Family: Phalacridae
- Genus: Olibrus; Erichson, 1845

= Olibrus =

Genus of beetles

Olibrus is a genus of shining flower beetles in the family Phalacridae. There are at least 30 described species in the genus Olibrus.

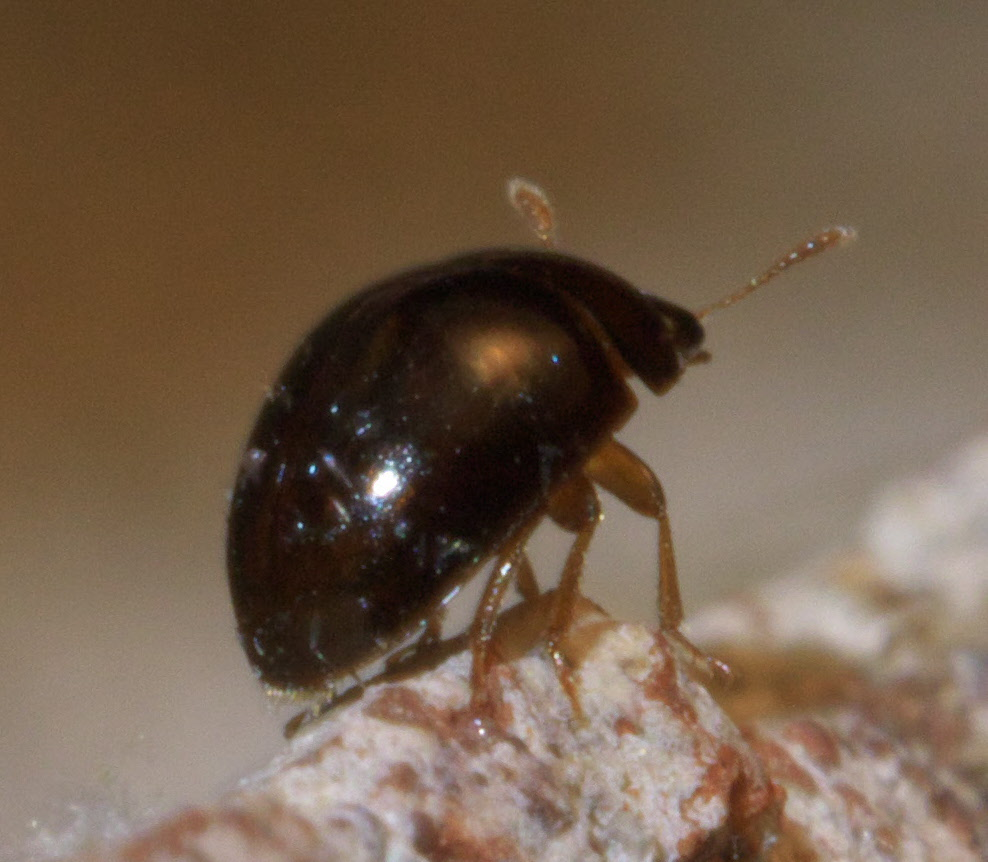

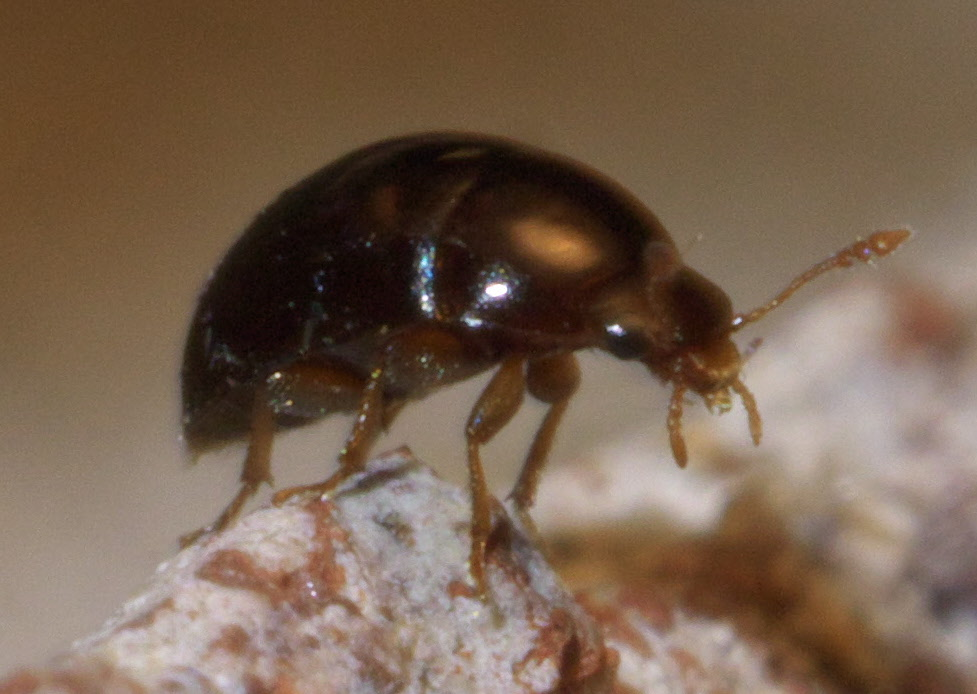

== Species ==
These 37 species belong to the genus Olibrus:

- Olibrus aenescens Küster, 1852^{g}
- Olibrus aeneus (Fabricius, 1792)^{g}
- Olibrus affinis (Sturm, 1807)^{g}
- Olibrus baudueri Flach, 1888^{g}
- Olibrus bicolor (Fabricius, 1792)^{g}
- Olibrus bimaculatus Küster, 1848^{g}
- Olibrus bisignatus (Ménétriés, 1849)^{g}
- Olibrus brunneus (Motschulsky, 1858)^{g}
- Olibrus bullatus Casey, 1916^{b}
- Olibrus castaneus Baudi di Selve, 1870^{g}
- Olibrus caucasicus Tournier, 1889^{g}
- Olibrus cinerariae Wollaston, 1854^{g}
- Olibrus congener Wollaston, 1864^{g}
- Olibrus consanguineus Flach^{g}
- Olibrus corticalis (Panzer, 1797)^{g}
- Olibrus delicatulus Tournier, 1889^{g}
- Olibrus demarzoi Svec & Angelini, 1996^{g}
- Olibrus fallax Flach, 1888^{g}
- Olibrus flavicornis (Sturm, 1807)^{g}
- Olibrus gerhardti Flach, 1888^{g}
- Olibrus guttatus Tournier, 1889^{g}
- Olibrus koltzei Flach, 1888^{g}
- Olibrus liquidus Erichson, 1845^{g}
- Olibrus millefolii (Paykull, 1800)^{g}
- Olibrus norvegicus Munster, 1901^{g}
- Olibrus particeps Mulsant & Rey, 1861^{g}
- Olibrus pygmaeus (Sturm, 1807)^{g}
- Olibrus reitteri Flach, 1888^{g}
- Olibrus reyi Guillebeau, 1892^{g}
- Olibrus rufipes LeConte, 1856^{g b}
- Olibrus seidlitzi Flach, 1888^{g}
- Olibrus selvei Guillebeau, 1892^{g}
- Olibrus semistriatus LeConte, 1856^{g b}
- Olibrus singularis Tournier, 1889^{g}
- Olibrus stierlini Flach, 1888^{g}
- Olibrus subaereus Wollaston, 1864^{g}
- Olibrus vittatus LeConte, 1863^{g b}

Data sources: i = ITIS, c = Catalogue of Life, g = GBIF, b = Bugguide.net
