= Nematoplus =

Scientific classification
- Kingdom: Animalia
- Phylum: Arthropoda
- Class: Insecta
- Order: Coleoptera
- Suborder: Polyphaga
- Infraorder: Cucujiformia
- Family: Stenotrachelidae
- Genus: Nematoplus; LeConte, 1855

Genus of beetles

Nematoplus is a genus of false longhorn beetles in the family Stenotrachelidae. There are at least three described species in Nematoplus.

== Species ==
These three species belong to the genus Nematoplus:

- Nematoplus collaris LeConte, 1855
- Nematoplus konoi
- Nematoplus yamato
