= Acanthogethes fuscus =

Scientific classification
- Kingdom: Animalia
- Phylum: Arthropoda
- Clade: Pancrustacea
- Class: Insecta
- Order: Coleoptera
- Suborder: Polyphaga
- Infraorder: Cucujiformia
- Family: Nitidulidae
- Genus: Acanthogethes
- Species: A. fuscus

Binomial name
- Acanthogethes fuscus (Olivier, 1790)

Synonyms
- Meligethes pinguis Horn, 1879

Species of beetle

Acanthogethes fuscus is a species of pollen beetle in the family Nitidulidae. It is found in Africa, Europe and Northern Asia (excluding China), and North America.
