= Afrogethes canadensis =

Scientific classification
- Domain: Eukaryota
- Kingdom: Animalia
- Phylum: Arthropoda
- Class: Insecta
- Order: Coleoptera
- Suborder: Polyphaga
- Infraorder: Cucujiformia
- Family: Nitidulidae
- Genus: Afrogethes
- Species: A. canadensis

Binomial name
- Afrogethes canadensis (Easton, 1955)

Synonyms
- Meligethes canadensis Easton, 1955

Species of beetle

Afrogethes canadensis is a species of pollen beetle in the family Nitidulidae.
