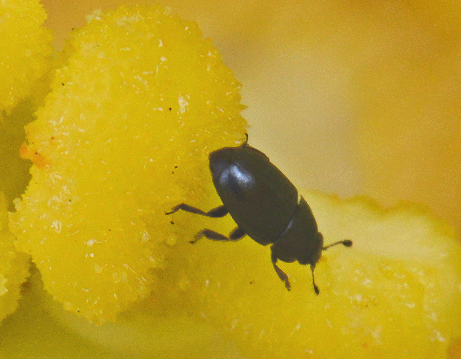
- Unidentified Meligethes adult inside a female courgette flower

Scientific classification
- Kingdom: Animalia
- Phylum: Arthropoda
- Clade: Pancrustacea
- Class: Insecta
- Order: Coleoptera
- Suborder: Polyphaga
- Infraorder: Cucujiformia
- Family: Nitidulidae
- Subfamily: Meligethinae
- Genus: Meligethes; Stephens, 1830

= Meligethes =

Genus of beetles

Meligethes is a genus of pollen beetles in the family Nitidulidae. There are more than 80 described species in Meligethes.

== Species ==
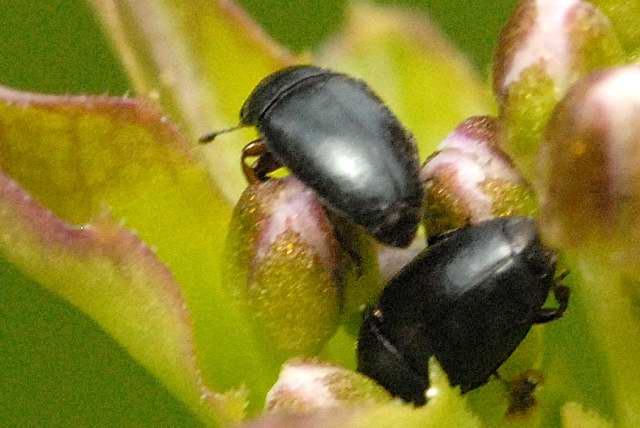
Two Meligethes flavimanus foraging

These species belong to the genus Meligethes:

- Meligethes amei
- Meligethes atramentarius Förster, 1849
- Meligethes atratus (Olivier, 1790)
- Meligethes aurantirugosus
- Meligethes aurifer Audisio, Sabatelli & Jelinek, 2015
- Meligethes auripilis
- Meligethes auropilosus Liu, Yang, Huang, Jelinek & Audisio, 2016
- Meligethes aurorugosus
- Meligethes bidens Brisout de Barneville, 1863
- Meligethes bidentatus Brisout de Barneville, 1863
- Meligethes binotatus Grouvelle, 1894
- Meligethes brunnicornis Sturm, 1845
- Meligethes buyssoni Brisout de Barneville, 1882
- Meligethes cardaminicola Audisio & Cline, 2015
- Meligethes chinensis
- Meligethes cinereoargenteus Audisio, Sabatelli & Jelinek, 2015
- Meligethes coeruleivirens Förster, 1849
- Meligethes corvinus Erichson, 1845
- Meligethes cyaneus Easton
- Meligethes denticulatus (Heer, 1841)
- Meligethes difficilis (Heer, 1841)
- Meligethes distinctus Sturm, 1845
- Meligethes egenus Erichson, 1845
- Meligethes elytralis Audisio, Sabatelli & Jelinek, 2015
- Meligethes exilis Sturm, 1845
- Meligethes ferrugineus
- Meligethes ferruginoides Audisio, Sabatelli & Jelinek, 2015
- Meligethes flavicollis Reitter, 1873
- Meligethes flavimanus Stephens, 1830
- Meligethes gagathinus Erichson, 1845
- Meligethes haemorrhoidalis Förster, 1849
- Meligethes hoffmanni Reitter, 1871
- Meligethes incanus Sturm, 1845
- Meligethes isoplexidis Wollaston, 1854
- Meligethes kunzei Erichson, 1845
- Meligethes lloydi Easton, 1968
- Meligethes lugubris Sturm, 1845
- Meligethes luteomaculatus Liu, Huang, Cline & Audisio, 2018
- Meligethes macrofemoratus Liu, Yang, Huang, Jelinek & Audisio, 2016
- Meligethes maurus Sturm, 1845
- Meligethes melanocephalus
- Meligethes morosus Erichson, 1845
- Meligethes nanus Erichson, 1845
- Meligethes nepalensis
- Meligethes norvegicus Easton, 1959
- Meligethes ochropus Sturm, 1845
- Meligethes ovatus Sturm, 1845
- Meligethes pallidoelytrorum Chen & Kirejtshuk, 2013
- Meligethes pectinatus Schilsky, 1894
- Meligethes pectoralis Rebmann, 1956
- Meligethes pedicularius (Gyllenhal, 1808)
- Meligethes persicus Faldermann, 1835
- Meligethes planiusculus (Heer, 1841)
- Meligethes politus Motschulsky, 1863
- Meligethes praetermissus Easton
- Meligethes pseudopectoralis Audisio, Sabatelli & Jelinek, 2015
- Meligethes sadanarii Hisamatsu, 2010
- Meligethes scrobescens Chen, Lin, Huang & Yang, 2015
- Meligethes semenovi Kirejtshuk, 1979
- Meligethes serripes (Gyllenhal, 1827)
- Meligethes shimoyamai Hisamatsu, 1964
- Meligethes shirozui Hisamatsu, 1965
- Meligethes shrozuii Hisamatsu, 1965
- Meligethes solidus (Kugelann, 1794)
- Meligethes subrugosus (Gyllenhal, 1808)
- Meligethes substrigosus Erichson, 1845
- Meligethes sulcatus Brisout de Barneville, 1863
- Meligethes symphyti (Heer, 1841)
- Meligethes torquatus Jelinek, 1997
- Meligethes transmissus Kirejtshuk, 1988
- Meligethes trapezithorax Liu, Huang, Cline & Audisio, 2018
- Meligethes tricuspidatus Liu, Huang, Cline & Audisio, 2018
- Meligethes tristis Sturm, 1845
- Meligethes umbrosus Sturm, 1845
- Meligethes varicollis Wollaston, 1854
- Meligethes violaceus Reitter, 1873
- Meligethes vulpes
- Meligethes wagneri Rebmann, 1956
- Meligethes zakharenkoi Kirejtshuk, 2005

In addition, there is a fossil species, Meligethes detractus, described by Förster in 1891 from Sannoisian (lower Rupelian, 34-30 mya) remains found at Kleinkems.
