= Scotodes =

Scientific classification
- Domain: Eukaryota
- Kingdom: Animalia
- Phylum: Arthropoda
- Class: Insecta
- Order: Coleoptera
- Suborder: Polyphaga
- Infraorder: Cucujiformia
- Family: Stenotrachelidae
- Genus: Scotodes; Eschscholtz, 1818

Genus of beetles

Scotodes is a genus of beetles belonging to the family Stenotrachelidae.

The species of this genus are found in Europe, Russia and Japan.

Species:

- Scotodes annulatus Eschscholtz, 1818
