= Alampyris =

Scientific classification
- Domain: Eukaryota
- Kingdom: Animalia
- Phylum: Arthropoda
- Class: Insecta
- Order: Coleoptera
- Suborder: Polyphaga
- Infraorder: Cucujiformia
- Family: Cerambycidae
- Tribe: Hemilophini
- Genus: Alampyris; Bates, 1881

Genus of beetles

Alampyris is a genus of longhorn beetles of the subfamily Lamiinae, containing the following species:

- Alampyris bicolor Martins, Santos-Silva & Galileo, 2015
- Alampyris cretaria Bates, 1885
- Alampyris curta Bates, 1881
- Alampyris flavicollis Galileo & Martins, 2005
- Alampyris fuliginea Bates, 1881
- Alampyris fusca Martins & Galileo, 2008
- Alampyris marginella Bates, 1881
- Alampyris melanophiloides (Thomson, 1868)
- Alampyris mimetica Bates, 1881
- Alampyris nigra Bates, 1881
- Alampyris photinoides Bates, 1881
- Alampyris quadricollis Bates, 1881
