= Anthrenus cechovskyi =

Scientific classification
- Kingdom: Animalia
- Phylum: Arthropoda
- Class: Insecta
- Order: Coleoptera
- Suborder: Polyphaga
- Family: Dermestidae
- Genus: Anthrenus
- Subgenus: Helocerus
- Species: A. cechovskyi

Binomial name
- Anthrenus cechovskyi Háva & Kadej, 2015

Species of beetle

Anthrenus (Helocerus) cechovskyi is a species of carpet beetle in the family Dermestidae. It is known from Nepal.

== Description ==
This insect has a slightly rounded, convex body, measuring between 2.1 and 2.9 mm in length. It has large oval eyes, and its head is covered in scales of white, light-brown, and dark-brown colors. The antennae are light-brown, with males having five segments and females six; both sexes have different-sized antennal clubs. The thorax is dark-brown with sparse holes, decorated with scales in various colors. The pronotum shows distinct color patterns with white scales along its edges. The elytra have irregular bands formed by mixed white and brown scales.

Its legs are brown, with darker upper legs and lighter lower legs, all covered in scales. The underside of its abdomen is whitish, with segments I to V covered in scales of white, light-brown, and dark-brown colors, with darker scales more concentrated along the sides. The rear of the abdomen (pygidium), is brown and lacks distinct ridges.

== Etymology ==
The name is a patronym honoring Peter Čechovský (Czech Republic), the collector of the type specimen.
