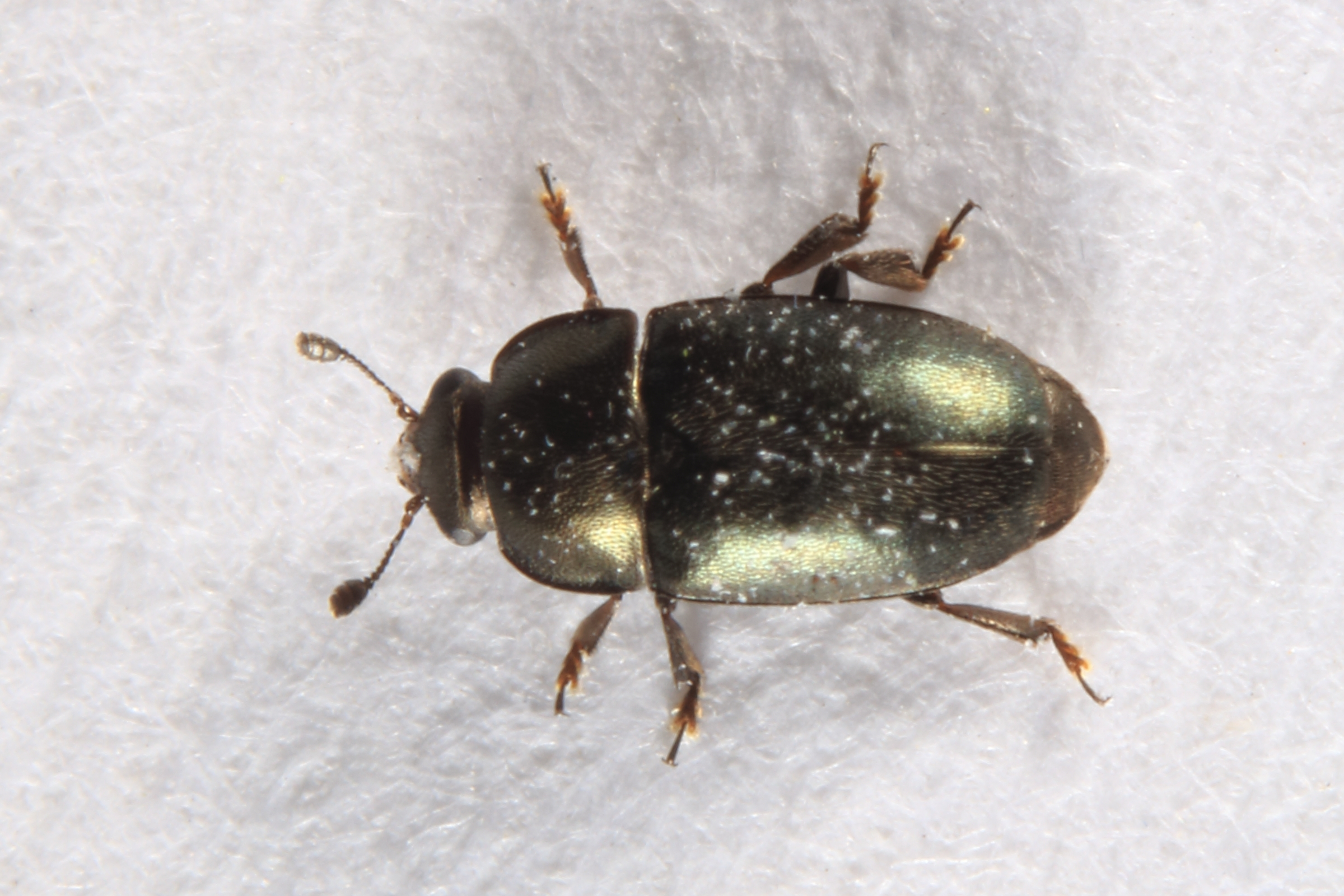
- Brassicogethes aeneus

Scientific classification
- Kingdom: Animalia
- Phylum: Arthropoda
- Clade: Pancrustacea
- Class: Insecta
- Order: Coleoptera
- Suborder: Polyphaga
- Infraorder: Cucujiformia
- Family: Nitidulidae
- Subfamily: Meligethinae; C. G. Thomson, 1859

= Meligethinae =

Subfamily of beetles

Meligethinae is a subfamily of pollen beetles in the family Nitidulidae. There are about 6 genera and about 10 described species in Meligethinae.

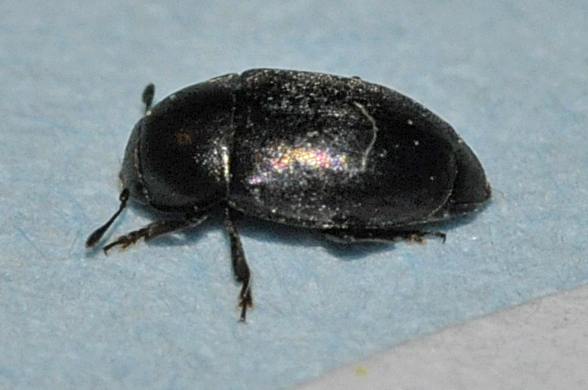
Meligethes atratus

== Genera ==
- Acanthogethes Reitter, 1871
- Afrogethes Audisio & Cline, 2009
- Brassicogethes Audisio & Cline, 2009
- Fabogethes Audisio & Cline, 2009
- Genistogethes
- Meligethes Stephens, 1830
- Pria Stephens, 1830
