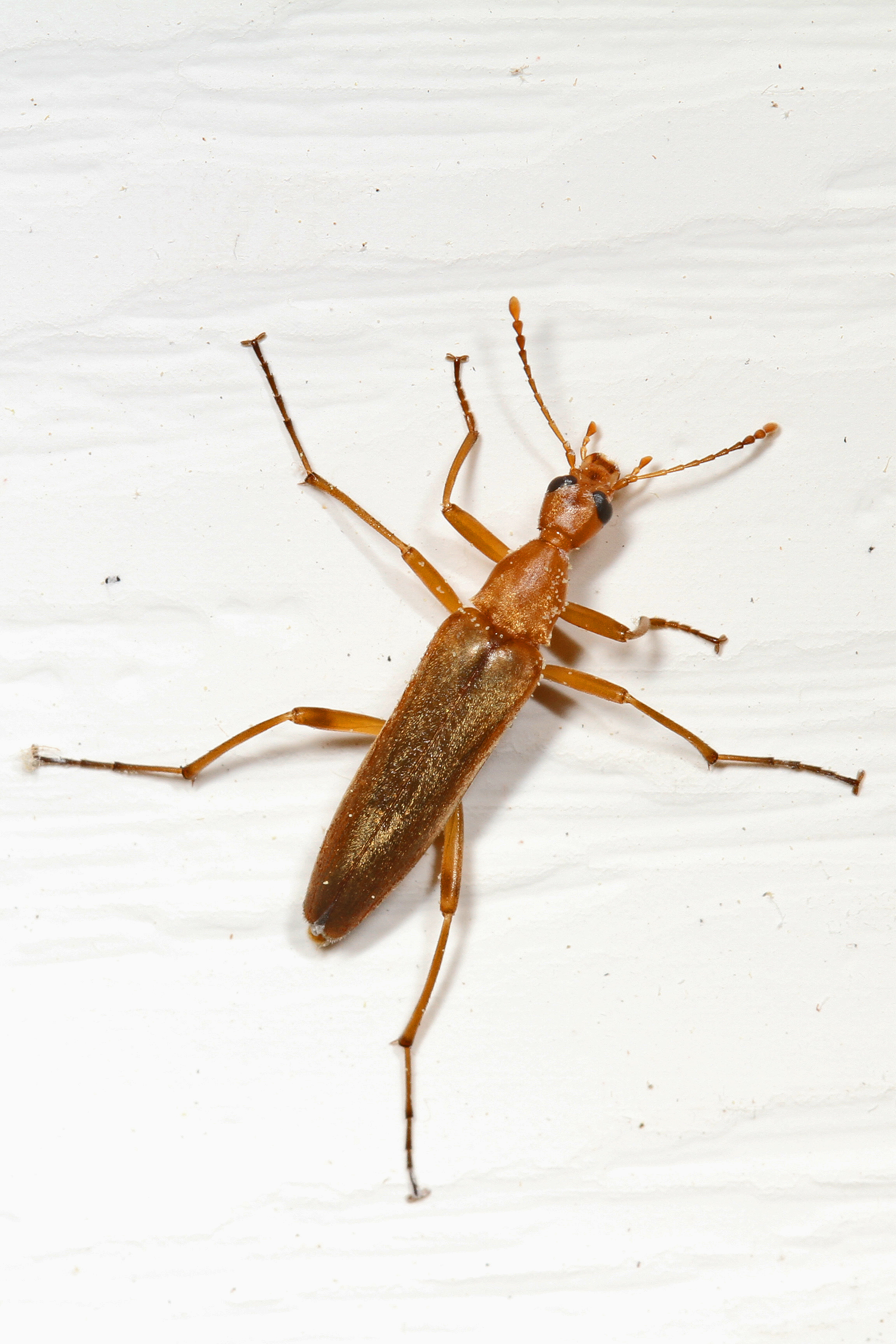
- Cephaloon lepturides

Scientific classification
- Domain: Eukaryota
- Kingdom: Animalia
- Phylum: Arthropoda
- Class: Insecta
- Order: Coleoptera
- Suborder: Polyphaga
- Infraorder: Cucujiformia
- Family: Stenotrachelidae
- Genus: Cephaloon; Newman, 1838

= Cephaloon =

Genus of beetles

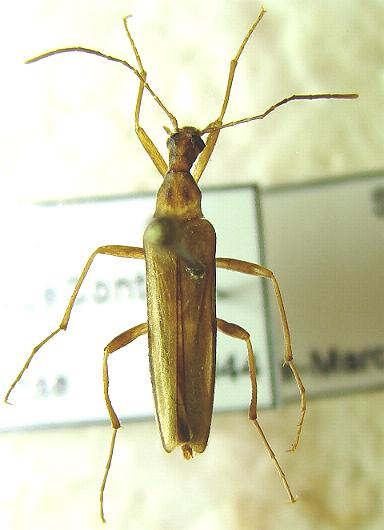
Cephaloon ungulare

Cephaloon is a genus of false longhorn beetles in the family Stenotrachelidae. There are about 6 described species in Cephaloon.

== Species ==
- Cephaloon bicolor Horn, 1896
- Cephaloon lepturides Newman, 1838 (false leptura beetle)
- Cephaloon pacificum Van Dyke, 1928
- Cephaloon tenuicorne LeConte, 1874
- Cephaloon ungulare LeConte, 1874
- Cephaloon vandykei Hopping & Hopping, 1934
