= Alampyris fusca =

Scientific classification
- Domain: Eukaryota
- Kingdom: Animalia
- Phylum: Arthropoda
- Class: Insecta
- Order: Coleoptera
- Suborder: Polyphaga
- Infraorder: Cucujiformia
- Family: Cerambycidae
- Tribe: Hemilophini
- Genus: Alampyris
- Species: A. fusca

Binomial name
- Alampyris fusca Martins & Galileo, 2008

Synonyms
- Alampyris fuscus Martins & Galileo, 2008 (missp.)

Species of beetle

Alampyris fusca is a species of beetle in the family Cerambycidae. It was described by Martins and Galileo in 2008. It is known from Costa Rica.
