= Anthrenus minutus =

Scientific classification
- Kingdom: Animalia
- Phylum: Arthropoda
- Class: Insecta
- Order: Coleoptera
- Suborder: Polyphaga
- Family: Dermestidae
- Genus: Anthrenus
- Subgenus: Helocerus
- Species: A. minutus

Binomial name
- Anthrenus minutus Erichson, 1846

Species of beetle

Anthrenus minutus is a species of carpet beetle in the family Dermestidae. It is known from Corsica (France), Sardinia (Italy), Portugal and Spain. It has also been introduced to Sudan.
