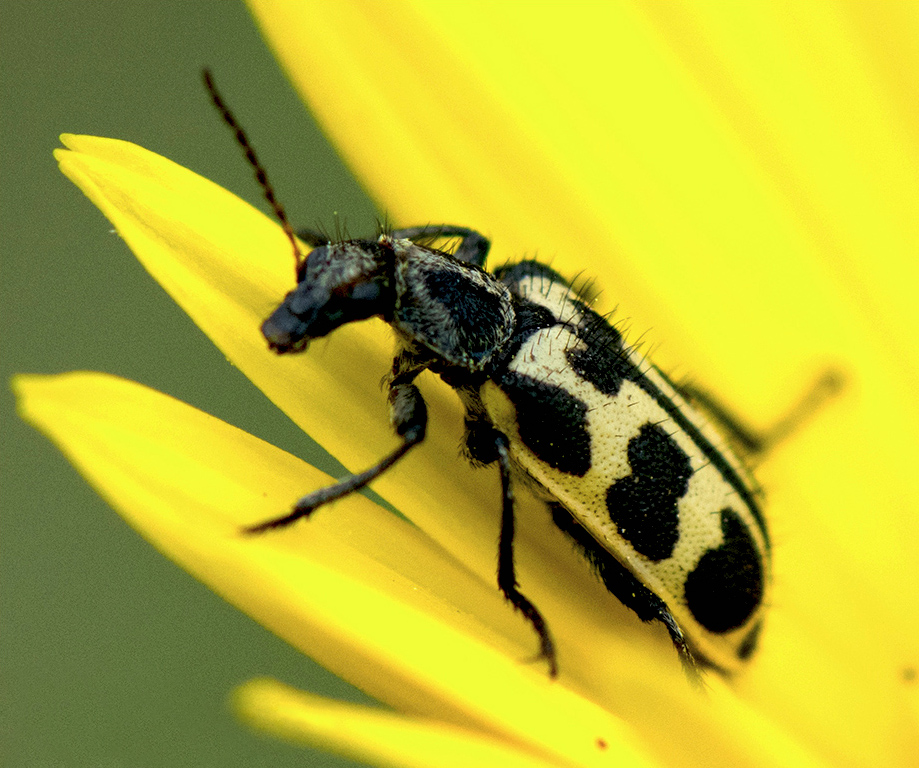
- Astylus atromaculatus

Scientific classification
- Kingdom: Animalia
- Phylum: Arthropoda
- Clade: Pancrustacea
- Class: Insecta
- Order: Coleoptera
- Suborder: Polyphaga
- Infraorder: Cucujiformia
- Family: Melyridae
- Subfamily: Melyrinae
- Tribe: Astylini
- Genus: Astylus; Laporte, 1836

= Astylus =

Genus of beetles

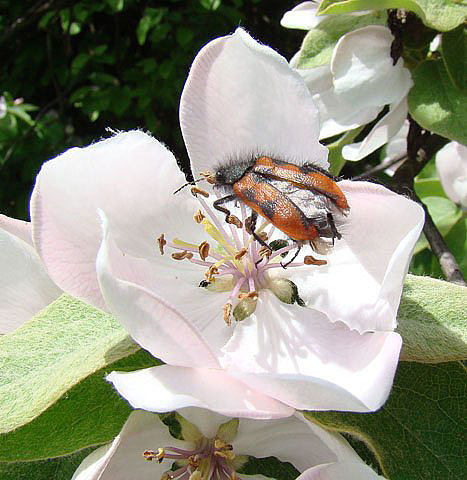
Astylus gayi

Astylus is a genus of beetles in the family Melyridae. More than 110 species have been described in Astylus. They are found in Central and South America.

One species, Astylus atromaculatus, known as the spotted maize beetle, is indigenous to Argentina and neighbouring countries, but has been accidentally imported into the warmer regions of South Africa, where it has become an invasive crop pest.

== Selected species ==
- Astylus antis
- Astylus atromaculatus
- Astylus aulicus
- Astylus bonplandi
- Astylus bourgeoisi
- Astylus cyanerythrus
- Astylus forcipatus
- Astylus gayi
- Astylus lebasi
- Astylus octopustulatus
- Astylus quadrilineatus
- Astylus rubripennis
- Astylus sexmaculatus
- Astylus trifasciatus
- Astylus variegatus
- Astylus vittaticollis
- Astylus vittatus
