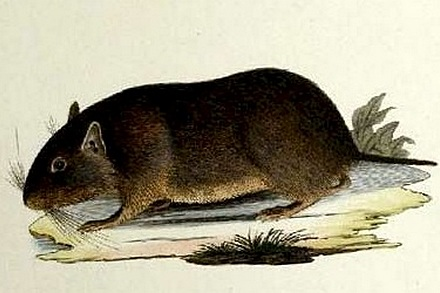

Conservation status
- Least Concern (IUCN 3.1)

Scientific classification
- Kingdom: Animalia
- Phylum: Chordata
- Class: Mammalia
- Infraclass: Placentalia
- Order: Rodentia
- Family: Octodontidae
- Genus: Aconaemys
- Species: A. fuscus

Binomial name
- Aconaemys fuscus (Waterhouse, 1842)
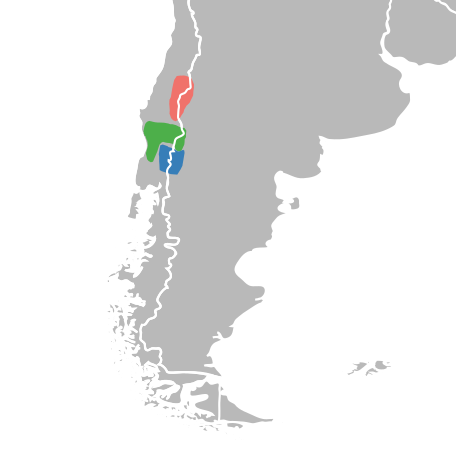
- Aconaemys distribution A. fuscus in red

= Chilean rock rat =

Species of rodent

The Chilean rock rat (Aconaemys fuscus) is a species of rodent in the family Octodontidae. It is found in the high Andes of Argentina and Chile.

== Description ==
The Chilean rock rat is a short-tailed rodent. Rock rats in the genus Aconaemys are similar to those in the genus Ctenomys but not so specialised for life underground. The ears are rather larger, the claws on the front feet which are used for digging are smaller, and the edging of hairs on the hind feet, used for shifting loose soil, is reduced in size.

The upper parts of the Chilean rock rat are dark brown, with the underparts ranging from reddish brown to white. Sample specimens described in 1966 and 1984, from two different locations, had a head-and-body length ranging from 135 mm (5 in) to 187 mm (7 in), with the tail adding another 58 mm (2 in) – 80 mm (3 in) to the animal's total length.

Its karyotype has 2n = 56 and FN = 108.

== Distribution and habitat ==
This species is endemic to parts of Argentina and Chile in the high Andes in South America. Its range extends from about 33°S to 41°S. In Argentina, it is restricted to thick forests of bamboo and Nothofagus dombeyi, but in Chile it is found in monkey puzzle (Araucaria) and southern beech (Nothofagus) forests, and above the tree line, usually among tussocky grass. It occurs up to about 4,000 metres (13,100 ft).

== Ecology ==
The Chilean rock rat is a semi-fossorial species and constructs a network of shallow tunnels and runways with entrances every metre or so. These burrows resemble those of Spalacopus and Ctenomys and are sometimes also used by Akodon longipilis and Geoxus valdivianus. It seems to be a colonial species and feeds on roots and seeds, apparently specialising on the roots and seeds of Araucaria in Chile. It is mainly active by night but sometimes also by day. It stores food for use in winter when it is active, moving about under the snow.

== Status ==
A. fuscus has a wide range and seems to be plentiful. No particular threats have been identified and the International Union for Conservation of Nature has assessed its conservation status as being of "least concern".
