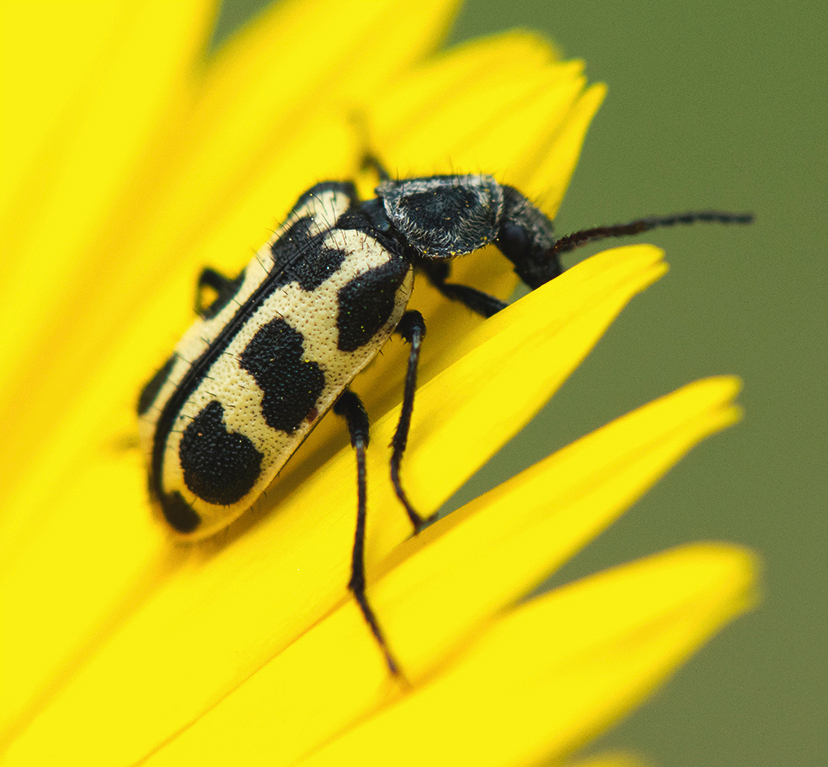

Scientific classification
- Kingdom: Animalia
- Phylum: Arthropoda
- Clade: Pancrustacea
- Class: Insecta
- Order: Coleoptera
- Suborder: Polyphaga
- Infraorder: Cucujiformia
- Family: Melyridae
- Genus: Astylus
- Species: A. atromaculatus

Binomial name
- Astylus atromaculatus (Blanchard, 1843)

= Astylus atromaculatus =

Species of beetle

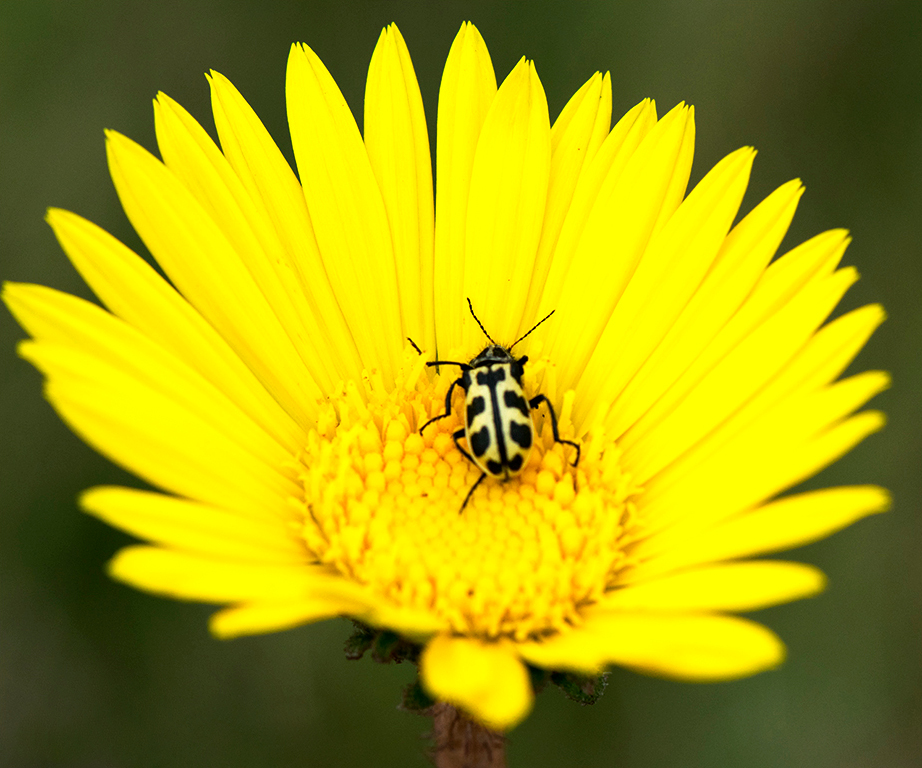
Astylus atromaculatus Dorsal aspect

Astylus atromaculatus is a species of beetle in the family Melyridae. It is variously known as the spotted maize beetle, or pollen beetle. It is indigenous to Argentina and neighbouring countries, but has been accidentally imported into the warmer regions of South Africa, where it has become invasive.

== Description ==
Adult Astylus atromaculatus are roughly oval in shape, slightly elongated, with parallel sides. They generally are slightly flat in shape, and like most Melyridae, tend to be soft and leathery in texture. They attain about 12 mm in bodily length by 5 mm wide. They are finely bristly with finely punctured elytra and upper surfaces. The body colour is generally black, but with pale hairs on the pronotum surrounding two large, eye-like dorsal black patches. However, the most conspicuous feature is the colour scheme of the elytra; they are yellow to orange with a black median stripe along their margins where the folded elytra meet. Two blotches on that median stripe form cross-marks, one about 2 mm from the anterior end of the line, and one about 1 mm from the posterior end. Each elytron has three much larger black blotches on its dorsolateral surface near its lateral margin. The filiform antennae have eleven antennomeres.

The larvae are covered with long, silky setae, brown to reddish in colour.

== Biology ==
The adult Astylus atromaculatus are herbivorous, particularly being attracted to flowers and feeding on pollen. In this role they are not much of an agricultural problem and for some crops, such as sunflowers, it is suggested that they are more beneficial as pollinators than they are harmful as crop pests. In particular they feed on pollen from wind-pollinated plants such as maize, sorghum and other grain crops in the Poaceae, and also various Cyperaceae. During the high season they may crowd inflorescences at certain times of the day.

The larvae might be more harmful, feeding in the ground on decaying plant matter, but also feeding on seeds and germinating seedlings. On the other hand, in South Africa they have been reported to be minor predators of stem borers in grain sorghum and maize.

Especially in the countries where they are invasive and where presumably their natural enemies are absent, Astylus atromaculatus may become sufficiently numerous to cause significant crop damage. However, it is arguable whether it is ever worth applying special pest control treatments, rather than at most modifying other routine applications to accommodate their control. There is however a concern that infestations could seriously damage rice harvests by causing apparent sterility; unlike the situation in maize, in which the male and female flowers are separate, rice female flowers can be seriously damaged by pollen-feeding beetles.

== Veterinary significance ==
Astylus atromaculatus is undoubtedly poisonous; livestock deaths have resulted from swallowing large numbers of beetles in their fodder or in pastures. Though this is not a routine event, it has been confirmed by actual investigation, for example when cattle on the Springbok flats in South Africa ingested heavily infested pasture. The beetle populations commonly peak during midsummer and autumn, when they feed mainly on pollen from grain crops. When there are too few crops such as sunflowers and maize, the beetles are prone to concentrate on grasses, and on forbs in flower. Poisoning caused severe diarrhoea with dark faeces and large quantities of mucus, rapidly followed by weakness and stasis of the rumen. Post mortem, beetles were found in large numbers in the rumen, associated with symptoms of dramatic congestion and irritation of the abomasum and haemorrhagic pseudomembranous intestinal enteritis. Because no treatment has proven effective for severely poisoned animals, it is necessary to keep livestock out of pastures while the plants are full of beetles, typically in the cool of mornings and evenings while the insects are inactive and not prone to scatter when alarmed by grazing activities. Yellow trays of detergent solution have been shown to trap the beetles, though it is not clear that they are an effective measure in reducing heavy infestations.
