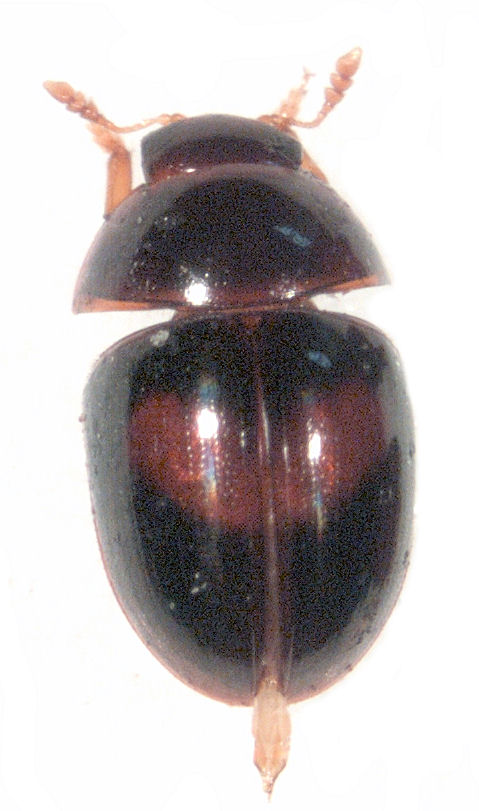

Scientific classification
- Kingdom: Animalia
- Phylum: Arthropoda
- Clade: Pancrustacea
- Class: Insecta
- Order: Coleoptera
- Suborder: Polyphaga
- Infraorder: Cucujiformia
- Superfamily: Cucujoidea
- Family: Phalacridae; Leach, 1815

= Phalacridae =

Phalacridae Temporal range: Albian–Recent

Family of beetles

Olibrus liquidus

The Phalacridae are a family of beetles commonly called the shining flower beetles, They are often found in composite flowers. They are oval-shaped, usually tan, and about 2 mm in length. Most species feed on fungus, although a number feed on flower heads.

Worldwide there are about 638 species in 52 genera. The oldest possible record of the family is a specimen from Spanish amber, dating to the Albian stage of the Early Cretaceous.

== Taxonomy ==
This family includes the following subfamily:

- Phaenocephalinae Matthews, 1899
- Phalacrinae Leach, 1815

Genera within this family include:

- Phaenocephalus-group
  - Phaenocephalus Wollaston, 1873
  - Phalacrinus Blackburn, 1891
  - Ranomafanacrinus Gimmel, 2013
- Stilbus-group
  - Acylomus Sharp, 1888
  - Nesiotus Guillebeau, 1896
  - Stilbus Seidlitz, 1872
  - Xanthocomus Guillebeau, 1893
- Pseudolibrus-group
  - Litostilbus Guillebeau, 1894
  - Megistopalpus Guillebeau, 1895
  - Pseudolibrus Flach, 1889
- Phalacrus-group
  - Phalacropsis Casey, 1890
  - Phalacrus Paykull, 1800
- Olibroporus-group
  - Austroporus Gimmel, 2013
  - Olibroporus Casey, 1890
  - Platyphalacrus Gimmel, 2013
  - Pycinus Guillebeau, 1893
- Ochrolitus-group
  - Ochrolitus Sharp, 1889
  - Sveculus Gimmel, 2013
- Olibrus-group
  - Olibrus Erichson, 1845
  - Tolyphus Erichson, 1845
- Olibrosoma-group
  - Antennogasmus Gimmel, 2013
  - Malagasmus Gimmel, 2013
  - Olibrosoma Tournier, 1889
- Litochropus-group
  - Litochropus Casey, 1890
  - Neolitochrus Gimmel, 2013
- Genera incertae sedis
  - Apallodes Reitter, 1873
  - Augasmus Motschulsky, 1858
  - Entomocnemus Guillebeau, 1894
  - Eulitrus Sharp, 1889
  - Grouvelleus Guillebeau, 1892
  - Litochrus Erichson, 1845
  - Malagophytus Gimmel, 2013
  - Paracylomus Gimmel, 2013
