= Pollen beetle =

Name for several species of beetle

Pollen beetle is an informal term for any species of beetle associated intimately with suitably pollen-rich species of flowers. Typically such a beetle is adapted to the pollen as a major part of its diet. Species in at least sixteen families of the order Coleoptera could be counted as pollen beetles, and "pollen beetle" also is a common name for some such species.

== Pollen feeding ==
Many insects of small to modest size benefit from feeding on pollen of suitable plants; pollen tends to be rich in protein, plentiful in season and easily available. Many plants, such as some members of the Araceae and Zamiaceae, produce large amounts of nutritious pollen, while producing little or no nectar. The pollen of such plants attracts and nourishes specialist pollen feeders that perform pollination, and many of those pollen feeders are beetles. In accessing the pollen of such plants, many pollen-feeding insects form mutually beneficial ecological relationships. Others damage the flowers however, reducing seed set, and harming the crop rather than benefiting it.

The nutritious Pollen from plants adapted to such pollinators contrasts with the also copious pollen from specialist anemophilous plants. Strict anemophiles commonly produce pollen that is low in nutritive value, since it is not adapted to attract or feed pollinators. Furthermore, as an adaptation to being borne effectively by the wind, anemophilous pollen must be very light.

More specifically than speaking loosely of "pollen beetles" as a common name the expression is the common name for certain species of beetle in particular, mainly a few members of the families Melyridae, Nitidulidae and Oedemeridae. However, there are many others that, though not commonly called "pollen beetles", do feed avidly on pollen, including species in the following:

- Alleculidae
- Buprestidae
- Cantharidae
- Cerambycidae
- Cleridae
- Curculionidae
- Dermestidae
- Languriidae
- Meloidae
- Mordellidae
- Phalacridae
- Scarabaeidae (tribe Hopliini in particular)
- Stenotrachelidae (Synonym Cephaloidae)

== Pollen beetles in the Melyridae ==
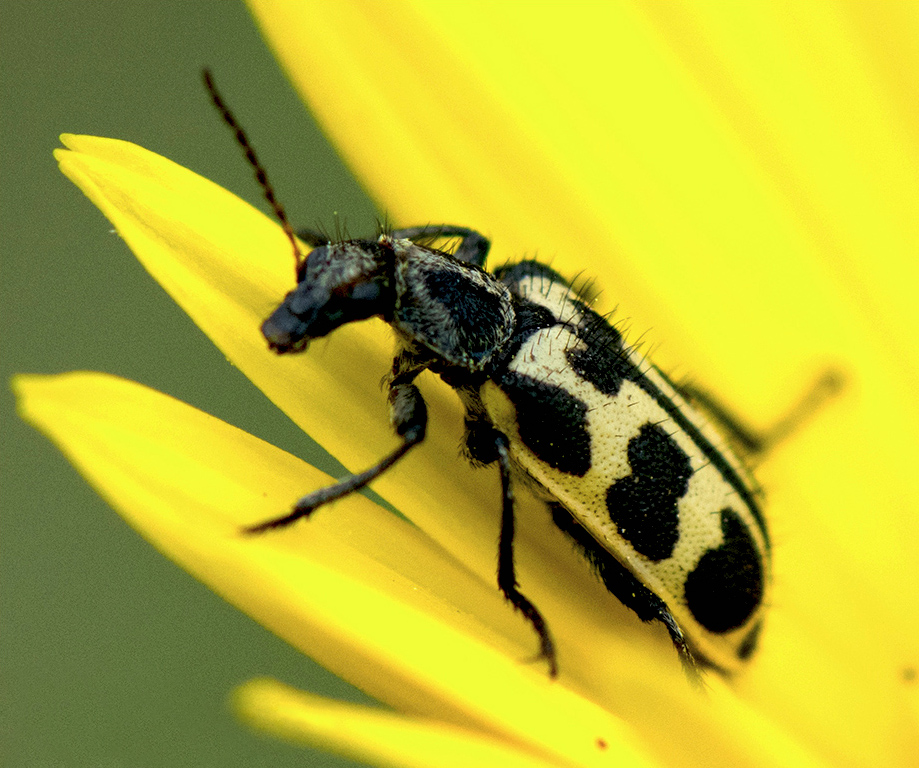
Astylus atromaculatus

Among the Melyridae the most prominent example of a species commonly referred to as a pollen beetle is Astylus atromaculatus. It feeds particularly on the large amounts of pollen produced by members of the grass family Poaceae, and related wind-pollinated families such as the Cyperaceae. It does however also visit many other flowers, such as members of the Asteraceae. It is not clear whether it causes more harm to crops by eating pollen and young tissues than it does good by promoting pollination.

Another species of "pollen beetle" in the family Melyridae is Dicranolaius bellulus. It is more of a predator than say, Astylus species, and is accordingly valued as an agent in pest management programs, but pollen is a major part of its diet.

== Pollen beetles in the Nitidulidae ==
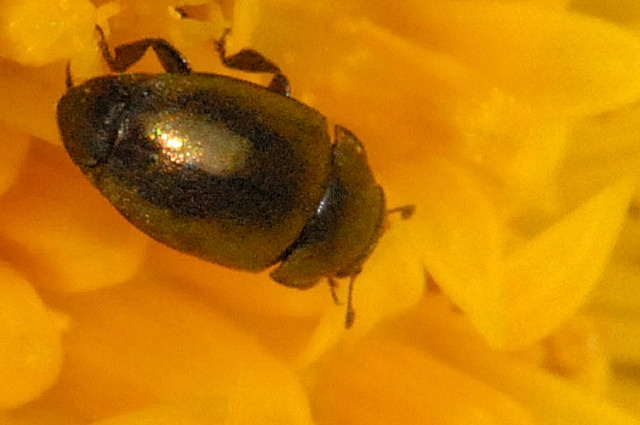
Meligethes aeneus

Several members of the Nitidulidae are similarly referred to as pollen beetles. In particular, practically all the species in the genus Meligethes are called pollen beetles. Of these the most notorious is probably the one now accepted as being properly called Meligethes aeneus/Brassicogethes aeneus. It is called the "Brassica pollen beetle", "Rape pollen beetle" and similar names, because it first became prominent as a pest of such crops in the first quarter of the 20th century.

== Pollen beetles in the Oedemeridae ==
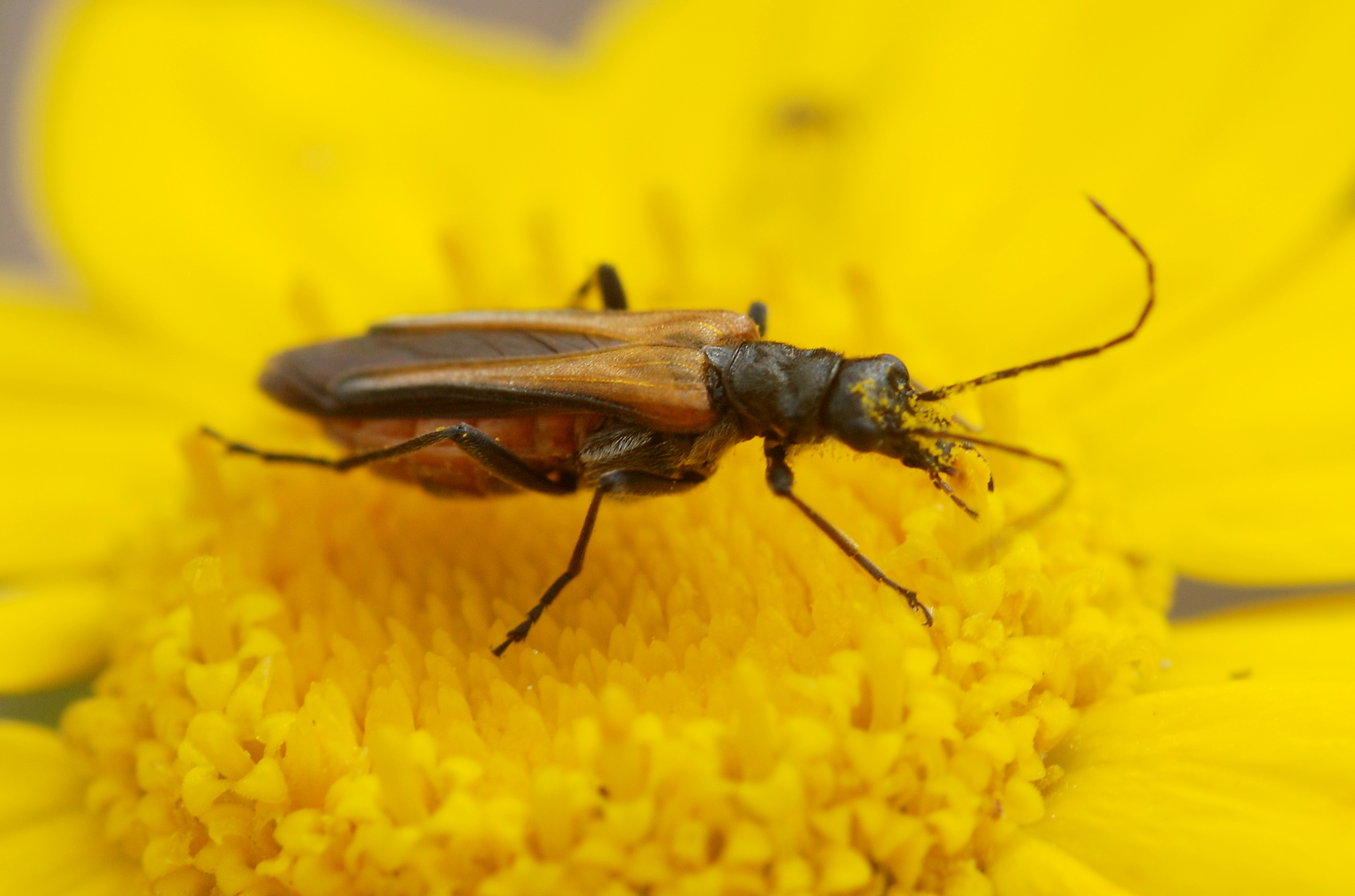
Oedemera simplex

Many species in the family Oedemeridae are similarly called "pollen beetles". For example, the Southern Pollen Beetle in the United States is Oxycopis notoxoides).

== See also ==
- List of pollen beetles (Nitidulidae) recorded in Britain
