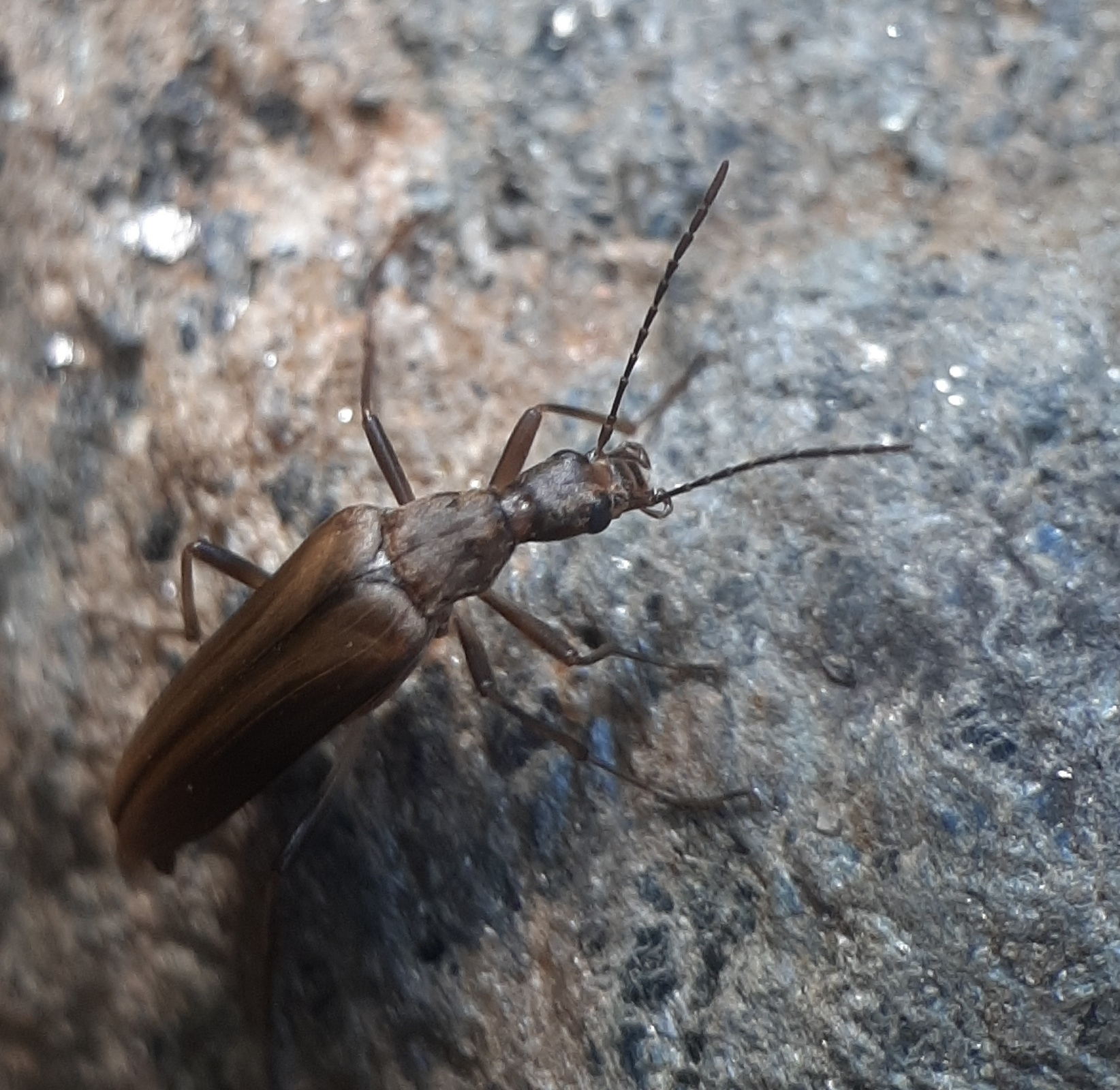
- Cephaloon ungulare

Scientific classification
- Kingdom: Animalia
- Phylum: Arthropoda
- Clade: Pancrustacea
- Class: Insecta
- Order: Coleoptera
- Suborder: Polyphaga
- Infraorder: Cucujiformia
- Superfamily: Tenebrionoidea
- Family: Stenotrachelidae; C. G. Thomson, 1859

Genera
- Anelpistus; Cephaloon; Nematoplus; Scotodes; Stenocephaloon; Stenotrachelus

Synonyms
- Stenotrachelidae

= Stenotrachelidae =

Family of insects

Stenotrachelidae, commonly called false longhorn beetles is a family of beetles in the superfamily Tenebrionoidea. They are native to the Northern Hemisphere. The larvae feed on heavily decomposed wood, while the adults are likely short lived and probably feed on pollen.

== Classification ==
The false longhorn beetles belong to the large superfamily Tenebrionoidea. There are three subfamilies with about 6 genera and 20 species:

- Stenotrachelinae: Anelpistus, Scotodes, Stenocephaloon and Stenotrachelus
- Nematoplinae: Nematoplus
- Cephaloinae: Cephaloon
