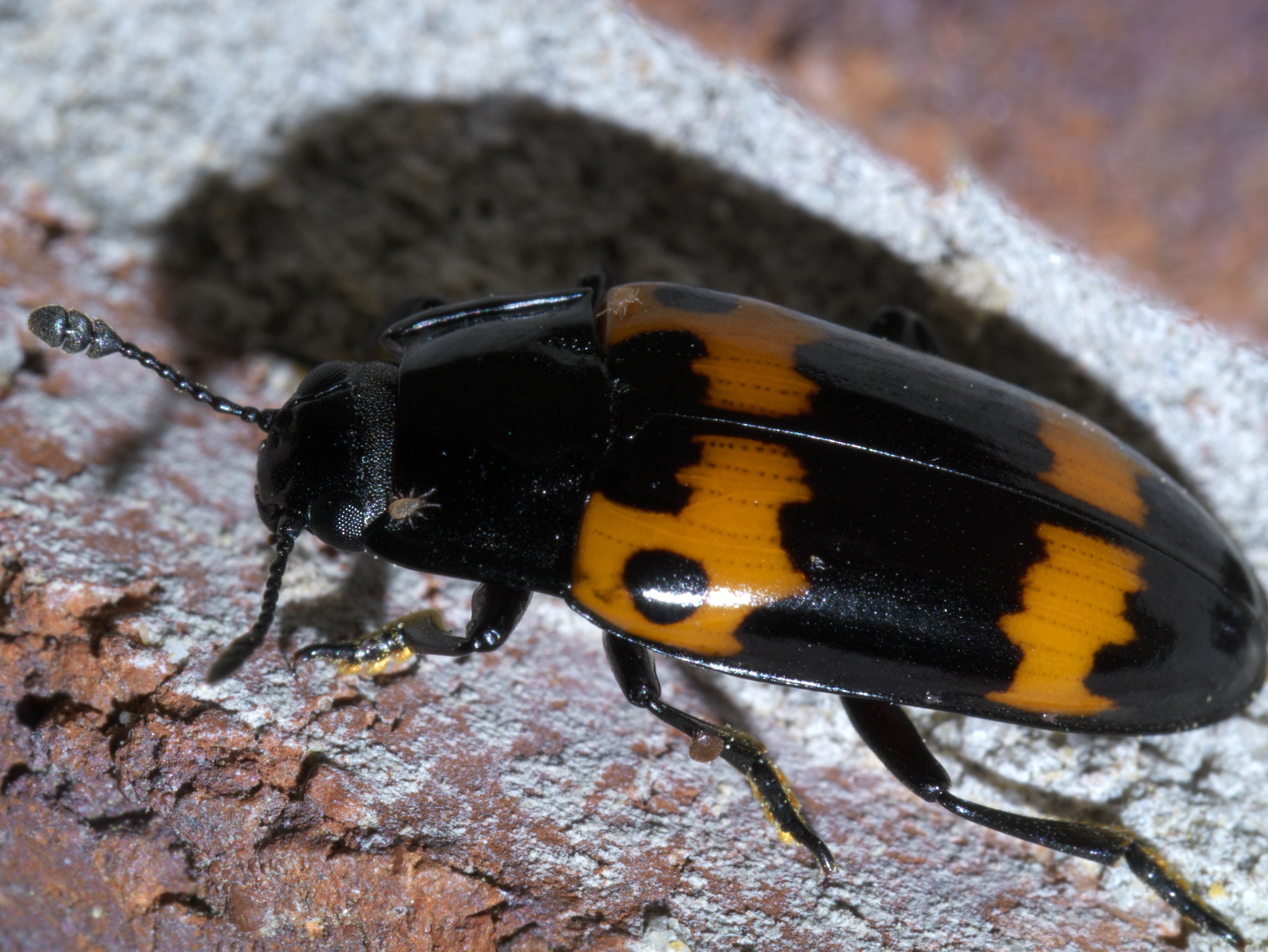
- Adult in Pryor Creek, Oklahoma; Note phoretic mite behind left compound eye
- Lectotype of Megalodacne fasciata

Scientific classification
- Kingdom: Animalia
- Phylum: Arthropoda
- Clade: Pancrustacea
- Class: Insecta
- Order: Coleoptera
- Suborder: Polyphaga
- Infraorder: Cucujiformia
- Family: Erotylidae
- Genus: Megalodacne
- Species: M. fasciata

Binomial name
- Megalodacne fasciata (Fabricius, 1777)

Synonyms
- Dacne fasciata (Fabricius, 1777); Engis fasciata (Fabricius, 1777); Erotylus bifasciatus Olivier, 1792; Ips fasciata Fabricius, 1777

= Megalodacne fasciata =

Species of beetle

Megalodacne fasciata is a large North American pleasing fungus beetle species (family Erotylidae). In English, it is commonly called red-banded pleasing fungus beetle or just red-banded fungus beetle, but these names are fairly generic and also describe many other Erotylidae.

This beetle was formerly placed in subfamily Dacninae, or – in taxonomic arrangements that prefer a more comprehensive subfamily Erotylinae – in tribe Dacnini of the Erotylinae; today it is generally included in a split-off subfamily Megalodacninae or tribe Megalodacnini.

== Description ==
With a length of 10-15.5 mm and 5-6 mm wide, adults of this species are the second-largest pleasing fungus beetles in most, and the very largest in part of its range. They are mostly black, with a jagged orange band across the elytra near the wingtip, and an irregular blotch in the same color near each "shoulder"; the midline of the elytra is black, dividing the wingtip band.

Like most of its close relatives, M.fasciata has large compound eyes whose ommatidia are also rather large (indicating nocturnal or crepuscular habits), and lacks a depression in the rather short "clubbed" tips of the antennae. The maxillary palps have a bluntly pointed hatched-shaped tip segment. Its pronotum is wider than long and has distinctly margined sides; the prothorax base is almost as wide as the "shoulders". The first three tarsus segments are slightly flattened cylinders, somewhat expending towards the tip, and of similar shape and size, while the fourth is significantly shorter and partially hidden within the third. On the underside, the first three segments have three groups of hairy pads. The elytra bear lengthwise rows of small pits.

=== Similar species ===
Its close relative M.heros, whose range only extends west as far as Illinois and Oklahoma, can often be distinguished from M.fasciata by larger size (up to 23 mm), and always by the combination of a more neatly rectangular pronotum – without the flaring side margins of the M.fasciata pronotum –, and "shoulder" blotches that are more extensive and often meet at the elytra midline. Also, the front edge of the prothorax has a hump in the center, which is absent in M.heros, and the fifth (claw-bearing) segment of the hindleg tarsi is of roughly equal thickness throughout in M.fasciata, whereas in M.heros (like in most other Megalodacne) it is conspicuously narrowed at the base.

Another species that is often confused with M.fasciata due to having a highly similar color pattern is the picnic beetle Glischrochilus fasciatus. This species, apart from anatomical details (it belongs to the sap beetle family, which is closely related to the pleasing fungus beetles), can be recognized by its smaller size of less than 10 mm.

== Distribution and ecology ==
M.fasciata is essentially restricted to North America east of the 100th meridian west, and almost endemic to the USA, with only a few records from Ontario and Québec, Canada, along the St. Lawrence River. In the US, it is found from Connecticut and upstate New York to Minnesota, Iowa, southeastern Nebraska and eastern Texas; possibly, its range extends along the Gulf of Mexico coast as far south into Mexico as Córdoba, Veracruz, but those records are old and may be based on misidentified species or locations. Spurious historical records also exist from western Nevada (probably at best an ephemeral population at the species' range limit) and California. However, in the 1980s the species' presence in northern California was confirmed; this population is more likely of recent origin and was introduced by humans.

This beetle eats fungi as larva and adults, but considering that this species is conspicuous, widespread in areas with dense human population, and has been collected in large numbers by scientists and insect collectors alike for several centuries, surprisingly little is known about its ecology; unlike many of its relatives, its larval ecology has been described in detail, however. Typically, M.fasciata is encountered on bracket fungi on dead logs and tree stumps, with a marked preference for Ganoderma (Polyporales: Ganodermataceae) species, in particular the lacquered bracket G.lucidum; wherever it is available, they seem to eat this species only. From cold, heat and sunshine, they hide under tree bark; in the summer months, when the adults are most plentiful, they are usually active at night and can be attracted by bright lights.
