= Confluentus =

Confluentus may refer to:

- Cryptocephalus confluentus, species of case-bearing leaf beetle in the family Chrysomelidae
- Glischrochilus confluentus, species of sap-feeding beetle in the family Nitidulidae
- Zappa confluentus, the New Guinea slender mudskipper, endemic to New Guinea
