= Eucalosphaera =

Scientific classification
- Kingdom: Animalia
- Phylum: Arthropoda
- Class: Insecta
- Order: Coleoptera
- Suborder: Polyphaga
- Infraorder: Cucujiformia
- Family: Nitidulidae
- Subfamily: Cryptarchinae
- Genus: Eucalosphaera (Jelínek, 1974) Jelínek, 1978

Species
- Several, including: Eucalosphaera elegans (Grouvelle, 1897); Eucalosphaera feae Grouvelle, 1892

Synonyms
- Calosphaera Jelínek, 1974

Genus of beetles

Eucalosphaera is a genus of sap beetles in the subfamily Cryptarchinae.
