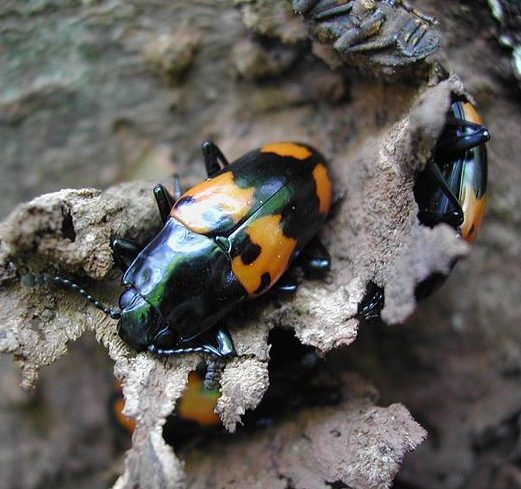
- Megalodacne heros beetles from the United States feeding on bracket fungi

Scientific classification
- Kingdom: Animalia
- Phylum: Arthropoda
- Clade: Pancrustacea
- Class: Insecta
- Order: Coleoptera
- Suborder: Polyphaga
- Infraorder: Cucujiformia
- Family: Erotylidae
- Subfamily: Megalodacninae
- Genus: Megalodacne; Crotch, 1873

Type species
- Ips fasciata (Fabricius, 1777)

Synonyms
- Psephodacne Heller, 1918; Romodacne Delkeskamp, 1937

= Megalodacne =

Genus of beetles

Megalodacne is a genus of fungivorous beetles in the family Erotylidae. Found in much of the world's warmer regions and in some temperate areas, it contains several dozens of species, but its exact delimitation has historically been much disputed and is still not entirely certain today.

== Description ==
Adult beetles of the genus Megalodacne range in size from 9 to 22 millimetres (0.35 to 0.87 in), making them among the larger members of the family.

Distinguishing characteristics of the genus along with other members of the subfamily Megalodacninae include large compound eyes and a lack of depressions in the "clubbed" tip of the antennae. The first three tarsus segments are slightly flattened cylinders, somewhat expending towards the tip, and of similar shape and size, while the fourth is significantly shorter and partially hidden within the third. On the underside, the first three segments have three groups of hairy pads.

Species of the genus Megalodacne closely resemble members of the genera Episcapha, Episcaphula and Mimodacne (which were formerly entirely or partly included in Megalodacne). They also often look superficially similar to several other beetles since the patterns of the markings of yellow, orange, or red on the elytra (called "fascia") of Megalodacne are shared by many other beetle species.

Megalodacne adults are distinguished from the closest relatives by a combination of traits: large size and a somewhat convex back, compound eyes with large ommatidia (indicating nocturnal or crepuscular habits), a pronotum that is wider than long and has distinctly margined sides, maxillary palps with a blunt and obliquely cut-off tip segment, and an antenna "club" which never involves the seventh segment (and usually only starts with the ninth).

Among those beetles most often confused with Megalodacne is the sap beetle (Nitidulidae) genus Glischrochilus. Their native ranges overlap, making it easy to confuse them (as with Megalodacne fasciata, Megalodacne heros, and the nitulidid Glischrochilus fasciatus from eastern North America). The best way to tell them apart is by size, as sap beetles are generally small, ranging from 2 to 12 mm (0.08 to 0.47 in) in length. Glischrochilus reaches a maximum length of only 12 mm (0.47 in). Megalodacne on the other hand are large beetles ranging from 9 to 22 mm (0.35 to 0.87 in). The elytra of the sap beetles which most resemble Megalodacne also do not cover the whole abdomen and leave the last abdominal segment(s) exposed. The elytra of Megalodacne, on the other hand, completely cover the abdomen.

== Ecology ==
Megalodacne species feed on harder bracket fungi than smaller members of the family. The fungi eaten include Ganoderma and Fomes species.

Megalodacne deposit eggs on the fungi on which they feed. Upon hatching, the larvae, like adults, also feed on the fruiting bodies of bracket fungi by burrowing into it.

There are two kinds of larvae of Megalodacne depending on the species. In some species, the larvae are elongated and feed on fungi by drilling holes inside of it. In others, the larvae feed alongside adults by gnawing out shallow depressions on the fruiting bodies of fungi. The latter larvae are sluggish, heavily sclerotized, and somewhat flattened. The larval stage takes about 2 to 3 months from egg to pupation. It is not uncommon to see adults feeding along with larvae.

These beetles are generally active from dusk til dawn; adults of some tropical species of Megalodacne are regularly attracted to lights at night.

== Taxonomy and systematics ==
Megalodacne was first described by George Robert Crotch in 1873. The type species is Megalodacne fasciata. The genus Megalodacne is classified as type genus of subfamily Megalodacninae, along its presumed close allies Episcapha and Episcaphula; alternatively, it is the type genus of tribe Megalodacnini of an expanded subfamily Erotylinae.

Historically, several related genera – namely Episcapha, Episcaphula, Macrodacne, Mimodacne, Oretylus and Scaphodacne – were included in Megalodacne. An unusual problem complicating anatomical research of this genus and its closest relatives is their high body fat content. The fat exudes in museum specimens, making them slippery and the delicate parts of their anatomy (such as mouthparts and genitalia) very fragile, which results in the specimens becoming hard to handle without causing permanent damage to them.

== Selected species ==
Species of Megalodacne include:

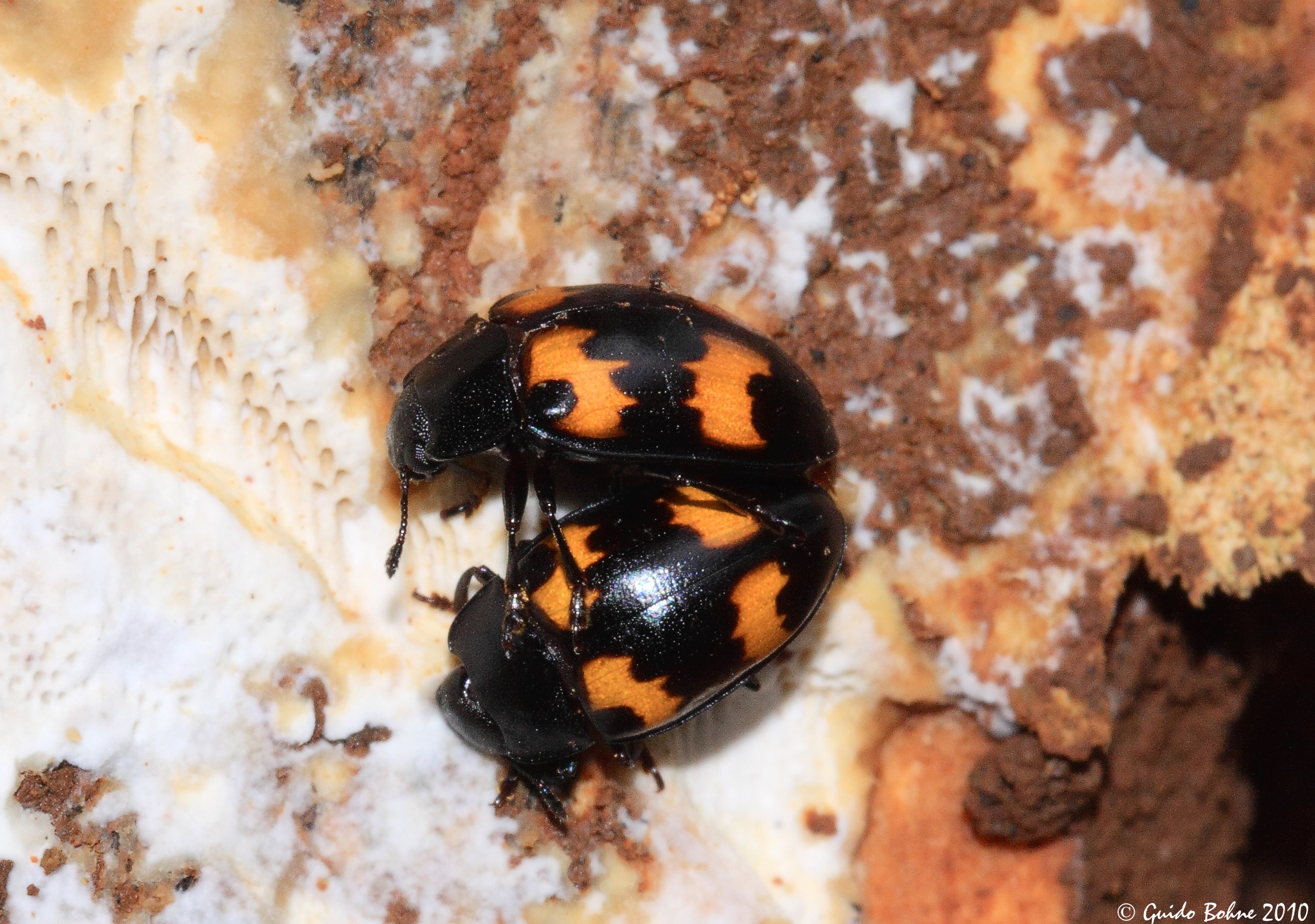
Unidentified Megalodacne (Megalodacne) mating, Serpong, Java, Indonesia

Subgenus Megalodacne (Megalodacne) Crotch, 1876 - Nearctic and eastern Asia. Distinct seams on the sides of the prothorax extending to the forward margin.

- Megalodacne annulata (Megalodacne (Romodacne)?)
- Megalodacne bellula (Lewis, 1883) – Japan, Korea, & China
- Megalodacne chinensis (Crotch, 1876) – China
- Megalodacne congoana (Megalodacne (Romodacne)?)
- Megalodacne elongatula (Crotch, 1876) – Malacca, Java, Flores
- Megalodacne fasciata (Fabricius, 1777) – eastern North America
- Megalodacne heros (Say, 1823) – eastern North America
- Megalodacne immaculata (Chûjô and Kiuchi, 1963) – Japan
- Megalodacne marginata (Arrow, 1925) – Assam
- Megalodacne plagia Delkeskamp - Congo Basin (tentatively placed here)
- Megalodacne promensis (Arrow, 1925) – Burma, China
- Megalodacne savagei (Crotch) (Megalodacne (Romodacne)?)
- Megalodacne similima (Crotch, 1876) – Sarawak, Sumatra
- Megalodacne varia (Gorham, 1889) – Malaysia

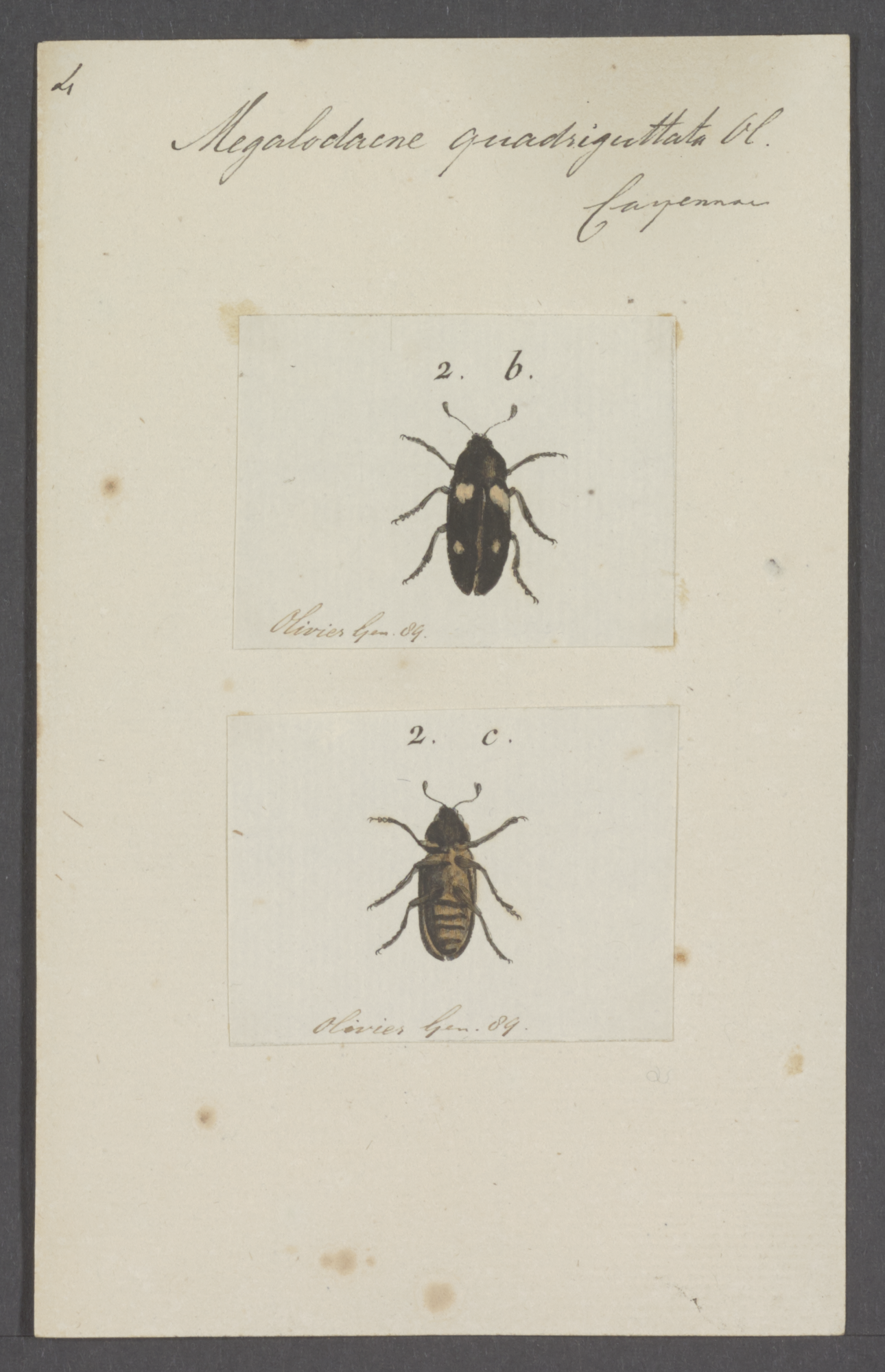
Illustrations of "Megalodacne quadriguttata" = Megalodacne (Psephodacne) indica adults

Subgenus Megalodacne (Psephodacne) Heller, 1918 - Neotropics. Seams on prothorax sides vary from well-developed and long like in Megalodacne (Megalodacne), to indistinct and short, or entirely absent.

- Megalodacne audouini (Lacordaire, 1842) – Mexico
- Megalodacne batesi Crotch, 1876 – Amazonian Brazil
- Megalodacne indica (Linnaeus, 1758) – Neotropics from Central America to Argentina (= M.multifida, M.quadriguttata)
- Megalodacne tortuosa (Lacordaire, 1842) – Mexico to Colombia?

Subgenus Megalodacne (Romodacne) Delkeskamp, 1937 - Tropical Africa and Madagascar. Formerly in Megalodacne (Psephodacne), but seams on the sides of the prothorax usually well-developed like in Megalodacne (Megalodacne).

- Megalodacne aspideoxesta Delkeskamp, 1937 - Cameroon to Congo Basin
- Megalodacne curvipes Fairmaire - Cameroon to Congo Basin
- Megalodacne dominula Bedel - Madagascar
- Megalodacne furcata Gorham - Togo to Congo Basin
- Megalodacne grandis (Fabricius, 1792) - Tanzania - widespread across tropical Africa
- Megalodacne natalensis (Fairmaire, 1891) - Congo Basin to Rift Valley region
- Megalodacne nesiotes Delkeskamp, 1937 - Madagascar
- Megalodacne sponsa Lacordaire - Madagascar

It is possible that undescribed Megalodacne species exist. A review of the UPN collection found 2 Megalodacne specimens – one each from Cundinamarca Department in central and Valle del Cauca Department in western Colombia – which did not seem to match the Megalodacne (Psephodacne) known from the region.

=== Formerly placed here ===
Moved to Amblyopus:

- Megalodacne bellopicta Kuhnt

Moved to Episcapha:

- Megalodacne asahinai Chûjô, 1938 (= M.yakushimensis)
- Megalodacne lewisi Nakane, 1950

Moved to Episcaphula:

- Megalodacne andamanensis (Gorham, 1888) (= M.affinis)
- Megalodacne eximia Arrow, 1922
- Megalodacne laeta Arrow
- Megalodacne megaloprepa Delkeskamp
- Megalodacne parva Delkeskamp, 1943
- Megalodacne philippinarum (Lacordaire, 1842)
- Megalodacne tonkinensis (Heller, 1918 (1920)) (= M.major)
- Megalodacne transiens Delkeskamp, 1953
- Megalodacne vitalisi Arrow, 1922

Moved to Macrodacne:

- Megalodacne fraudulenta (Heller, 1918 (1920))
- Megalodacne luteoguttata Crotch, 1876 (= M.dohrni (Kuhnt, 1910) non Gorham, 1901)

Moved to Mimodacne:

- Megalodacne abnormalis Crotch, 1876
- Megalodacne belgarum (Bedel, 1917)
- Megalodacne grandipennis (Fairmaire, 1891)
- Megalodacne imperatrix Gorham, 1883
- Megalodacne kolbei Kuhnt, 1908 (sometimes in M.magnifica)
- Megalodacne longiuscula Fairmaire, 1891
- Megalodacne magnifica Harold, 1878
- Megalodacne rhodesiaca (Bedel, 1917)

Moved to Neodacne:

- Megalodacne okunii Chûjô, 1936

Moved to Oretylus:

- Megalodacne hislopi (Crotch, 1876) (= M.scabra)
