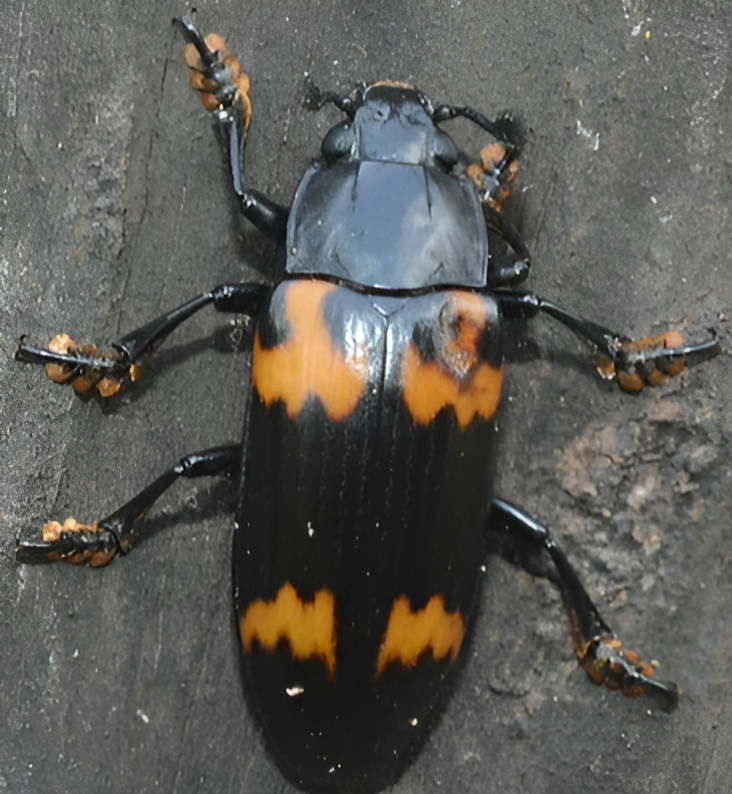

Scientific classification
- Kingdom: Animalia
- Phylum: Arthropoda
- Class: Insecta
- Order: Coleoptera
- Suborder: Polyphaga
- Infraorder: Cucujiformia
- Family: Erotylidae
- Genus: Megalodacne
- Species: M. grandipennis

Binomial name
- Megalodacne grandipennis (Fairmaire, 1891)

= Megalodacne grandipennis =

Species of beetle

Megalodacne grandipennis is a species of pleasing fungus beetle, in the family Erotylidae. It is endemic to Tanzania and Namibia. As is typical of species in the genus Megalodacne, M. grandipennis feeds on bracket fungi.

The species' name comes from Latin and Ancient Greek, "grandipennis" meaning "large wing" in Latin.

== Taxonomy and systematics ==
Megalodacne grandipennis was discovered by Léon Fairmaire in 1891, and contains the following subspecies:

- Megalodacne grandipennis cunctans
- Megalodacne grandipennis inuncata
- Megalodacne grandipennis rhodesiaca
