= Megalodacne varia =

Scientific classification
- Kingdom: Animalia
- Phylum: Arthropoda
- Clade: Pancrustacea
- Class: Insecta
- Order: Coleoptera
- Suborder: Polyphaga
- Infraorder: Cucujiformia
- Family: Erotylidae
- Genus: Megalodacne
- Species: M. varia

Binomial name
- Megalodacne varia (Gorham, 1889)

Species of beetle

Megalodacne varia is a species of pleasing fungus beetle in the family Erotylidae. It is endemic to Malaysia. M. varia was discovered by Henry Stephen Gorham in 1889. Like all species of Megalodacne, M. varia feeds on bracket fungi.
