= Pityophagus cephalotes =

Scientific classification
- Domain: Eukaryota
- Kingdom: Animalia
- Phylum: Arthropoda
- Class: Insecta
- Order: Coleoptera
- Suborder: Polyphaga
- Infraorder: Cucujiformia
- Family: Nitidulidae
- Genus: Pityophagus
- Species: P. cephalotes

Binomial name
- Pityophagus cephalotes LeConte, 1866

Species of beetle

Pityophagus cephalotes is a species of sap-feeding beetle in the family Nitidulidae. It is found in North America.
