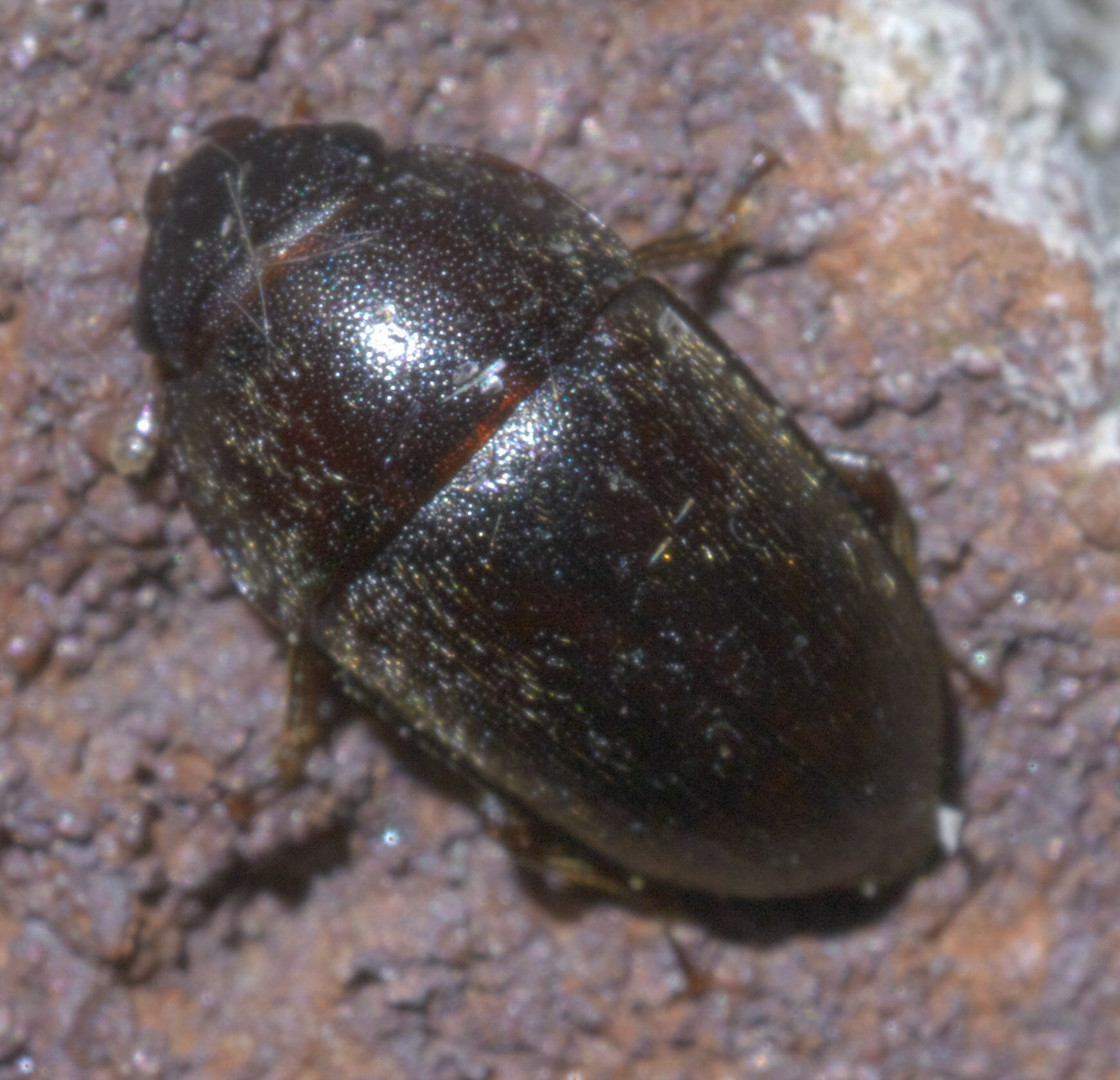

Scientific classification
- Kingdom: Animalia
- Phylum: Arthropoda
- Class: Insecta
- Order: Coleoptera
- Suborder: Polyphaga
- Infraorder: Cucujiformia
- Family: Nitidulidae
- Genus: Cryptarcha
- Species: C. ampla

Binomial name
- Cryptarcha ampla Erichson, 1843

= Cryptarcha ampla =

Species of beetle

Cryptarcha ampla is a species of sap-feeding beetle in the family Nitidulidae. It is found in North America.

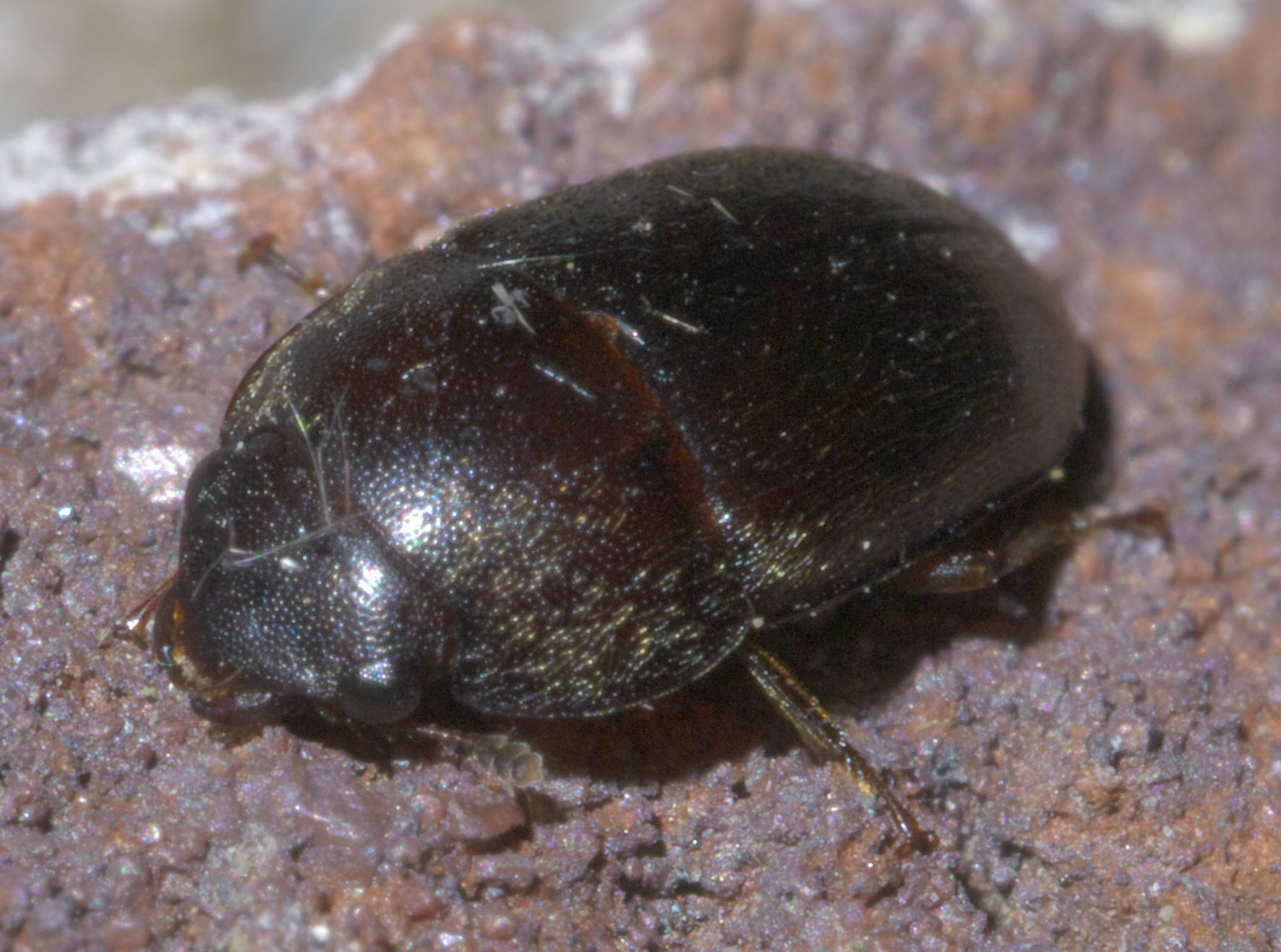

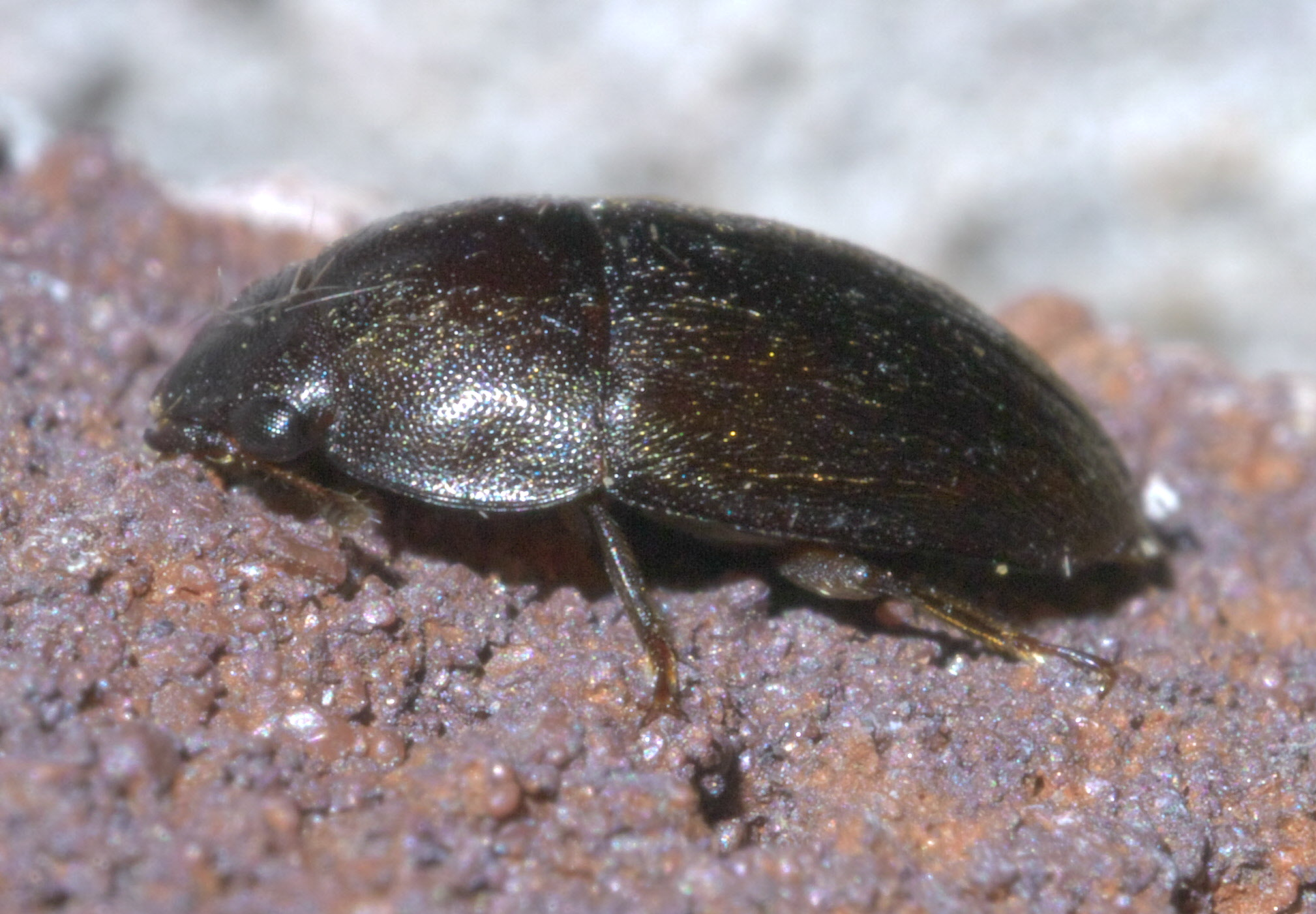
