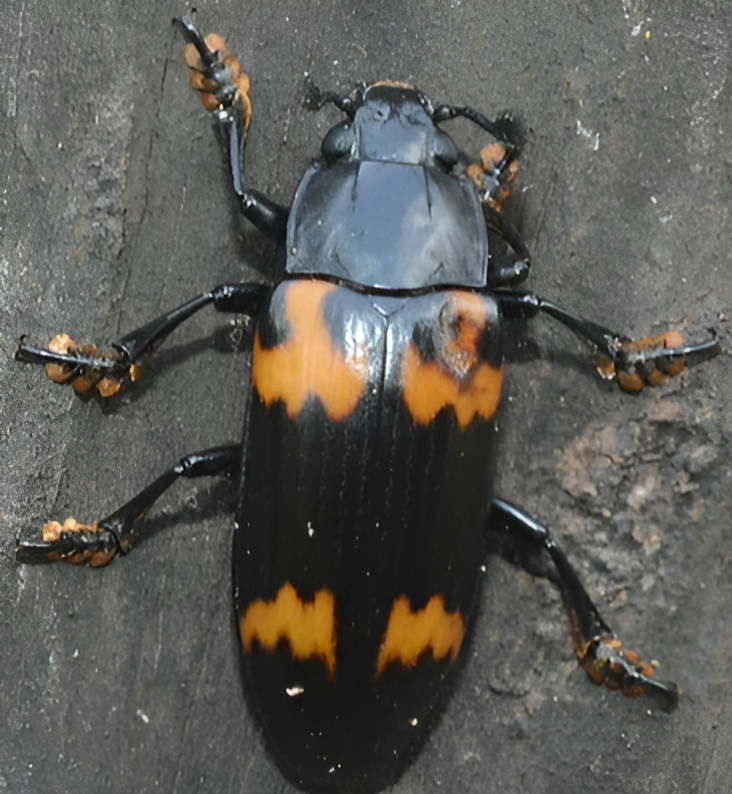
- Adult Mimodacne grandipennis in Ugalla River National Park, Tanzania

Scientific classification
- Kingdom: Animalia
- Phylum: Arthropoda
- Clade: Pancrustacea
- Class: Insecta
- Order: Coleoptera
- Suborder: Polyphaga
- Infraorder: Cucujiformia
- Family: Erotylidae
- Genus: Mimodacne; Bedel, 1917

Synonyms
- Libycodacne Heller, 1918

= Mimodacne =

Genus of beetles

Mimodacne is a genus of pleasing fungus beetles (family Erotylidae) from the Afrotropics. It was described by Ernest Marie Louis Bedel in 1917.

This genus comprises some species previously included in Megalodacne, in which the "club" of the antenna is very large and markedly asymmetrical.

An interesting trait found in this genus (as well as in the close relative Episcaphula, which also was often included in Megalodacne) is a geographical pattern of color change between or even within species: In western tropical Africa, Mimodacne are usually black with yellowish-orange pattern, whereas to the east the pattern is usually reddish-orange. In addition, in the southern Congo Basin, where habitat transitions from tropical rainforest to the drier biomes further south, Mimodacne beetles tend to become lighter in accordance with Gloger's Rule, their black coloration being replaced by chestnut brown.

The adults of at least some Mimodacne (e.g. M.grandipennis and M.imperatrix) are strongly sexually dimorphic by Erotylidae standards. Males have more strongly marked punctuations on a smooth prosternum, while females may have no or very faint punctures and instead a weakly ribbed surface structure. On the abdomen, all adults have some bristles on the edge of the anal segment. Males also have a dense bristly patch running along the rear margin in the center of the anal segment itself, extending almost halfway to the front edge; in females this is reduced to a small patch of scattered bristles, if not entirely absent. The hindleg tibiae are notably curved in males, and have a widened inner edge with a grainy texture and a few bristles. Females have straighter hindleg tibiae, with narrow and smooth-surfaced but very bristly inner edge lacking granulations. In addition, the tarsal segments of males are wider than in females.

== Species ==
- Mimodacne abnormalis (Crotch, 1876)
- Mimodacne belgarum Bedel, 1917
- Mimodacne grandipennis (Fairmaire, 1891) – Tanzania
- Mimodacne imperatrix (Gorham, 1883) - Mozambique
- Mimodacne kolbei (Kuhnt, 1908) (sometimes in M.magnifica)
- Mimodacne longiuscula (Fairmaire, 1891)
- Mimodacne magnifica (Harold, 1878)
- Mimodacne rhodesiaca Bedel, 1917
