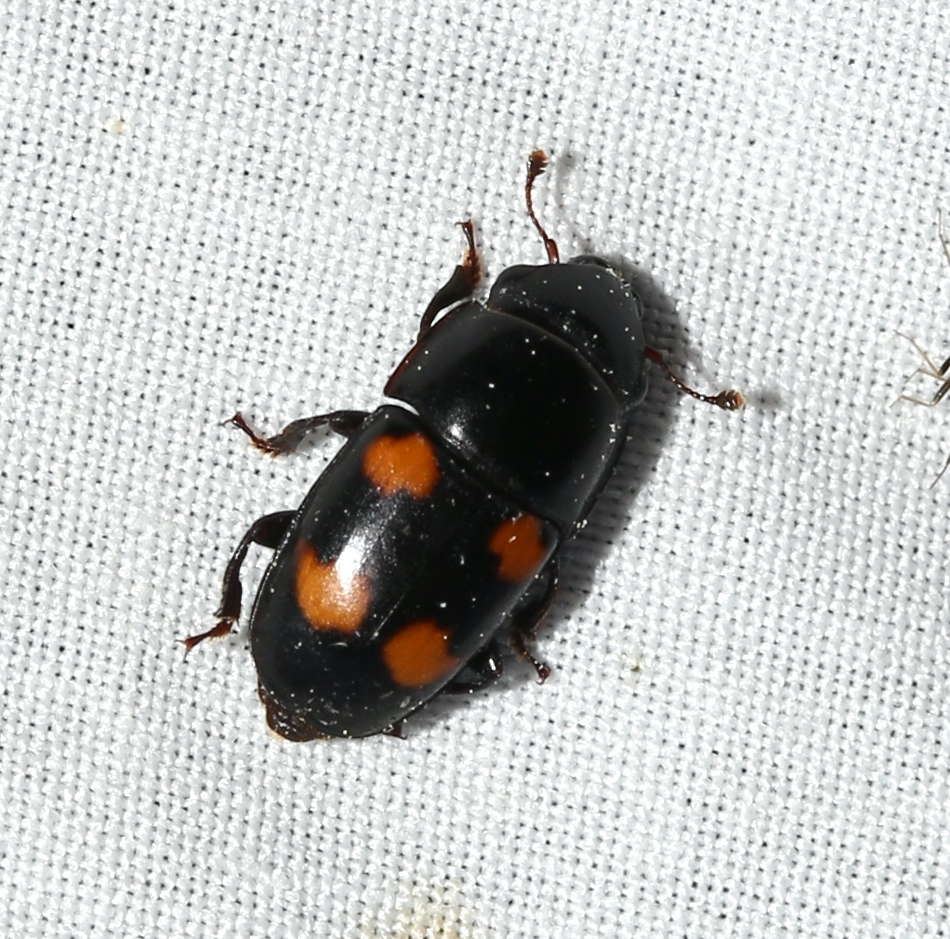

Scientific classification
- Kingdom: Animalia
- Phylum: Arthropoda
- Class: Insecta
- Order: Coleoptera
- Suborder: Polyphaga
- Infraorder: Cucujiformia
- Family: Nitidulidae
- Genus: Glischrochilus
- Species: G. obtusus

Binomial name
- Glischrochilus obtusus (Say, 1835)

= Glischrochilus obtusus =

Species of beetle

Glischrochilus obtusus is a species of sap-feeding beetle in the family Nitidulidae. It is found in North America.
