= Glischrochilus siepmanni =

Scientific classification
- Domain: Eukaryota
- Kingdom: Animalia
- Phylum: Arthropoda
- Class: Insecta
- Order: Coleoptera
- Suborder: Polyphaga
- Infraorder: Cucujiformia
- Family: Nitidulidae
- Genus: Glischrochilus
- Species: G. siepmanni

Binomial name
- Glischrochilus siepmanni Brown, 1932

Species of beetle

Glischrochilus siepmanni is a species of sap-feeding beetle in the family Nitidulidae. It is found in North America.
