= Megalodacne audouini =

Scientific classification
- Kingdom: Animalia
- Phylum: Arthropoda
- Clade: Pancrustacea
- Class: Insecta
- Order: Coleoptera
- Suborder: Polyphaga
- Infraorder: Cucujiformia
- Family: Erotylidae
- Genus: Megalodacne
- Species: M. audouini

Binomial name
- Megalodacne audouini (Lacordaire, 1842)

Synonyms
- Dacne audouini Lacordaire, 1842

Species of beetle

Megalodacne audouini is a species of beetle of the family Erotylidae. It is found in Mexico.
