= Megalodacne indica =

Scientific classification
- Kingdom: Animalia
- Phylum: Arthropoda
- Clade: Pancrustacea
- Class: Insecta
- Order: Coleoptera
- Suborder: Polyphaga
- Infraorder: Cucujiformia
- Family: Erotylidae
- Genus: Megalodacne
- Species: M. indica

Binomial name
- Megalodacne indica (Linnaeus, 1758)

Synonyms
- Silpha indica Linnaeus, 1758; Episcapha heros Guérin-Méneville, 1841; Engis signata Laporte, 1840; Erotylus quadriguttata Olivier, 1792; Dacne multifida Lacordaire, 1842

Species of beetle

Megalodacne indica is a species of beetle of the family Erotylidae. It is found in the central, southeastern, and southern portions of the Neotropical region.

== Subspecies ==
- Megalodacne indica indica (central, southeastern, and southern portions of the Neotropical region)
- Megalodacne indica latifasciata Delkeskamp, 1952 (Peru, Ecuador)
