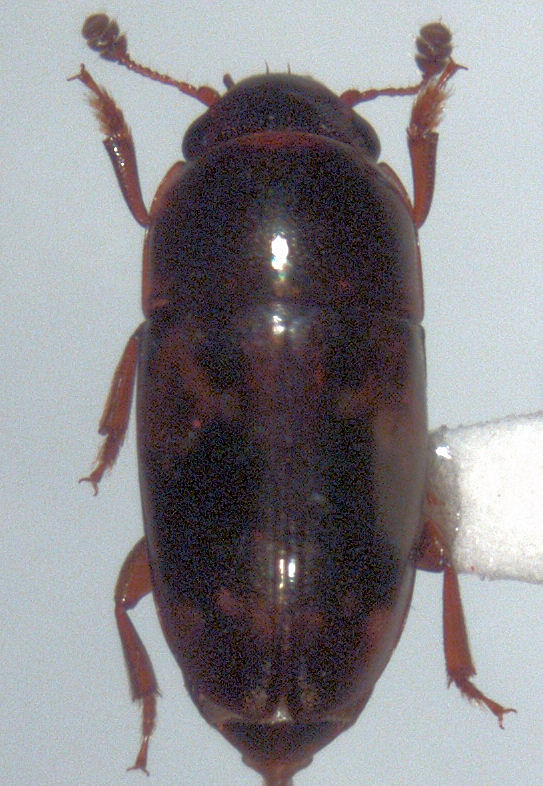
- Cryptarcha optanda

Scientific classification
- Domain: Eukaryota
- Kingdom: Animalia
- Phylum: Arthropoda
- Class: Insecta
- Order: Coleoptera
- Suborder: Polyphaga
- Infraorder: Cucujiformia
- Family: Nitidulidae
- Subfamily: Cryptarchinae
- Genus: Cryptarcha; Shuckard, 1839

Synonyms
- Arhina (Murray, 1867); Cryptarchina (Iablokoff-khnzorian, 1966); Cryptarchula (Ganglbauer, 1899); Lepiarcha (Sharp, 1891); Priateles Broun, 1881; Priatelus Broun, 1882; Priates Broun, 1882

= Cryptarcha =

Genus of beetles

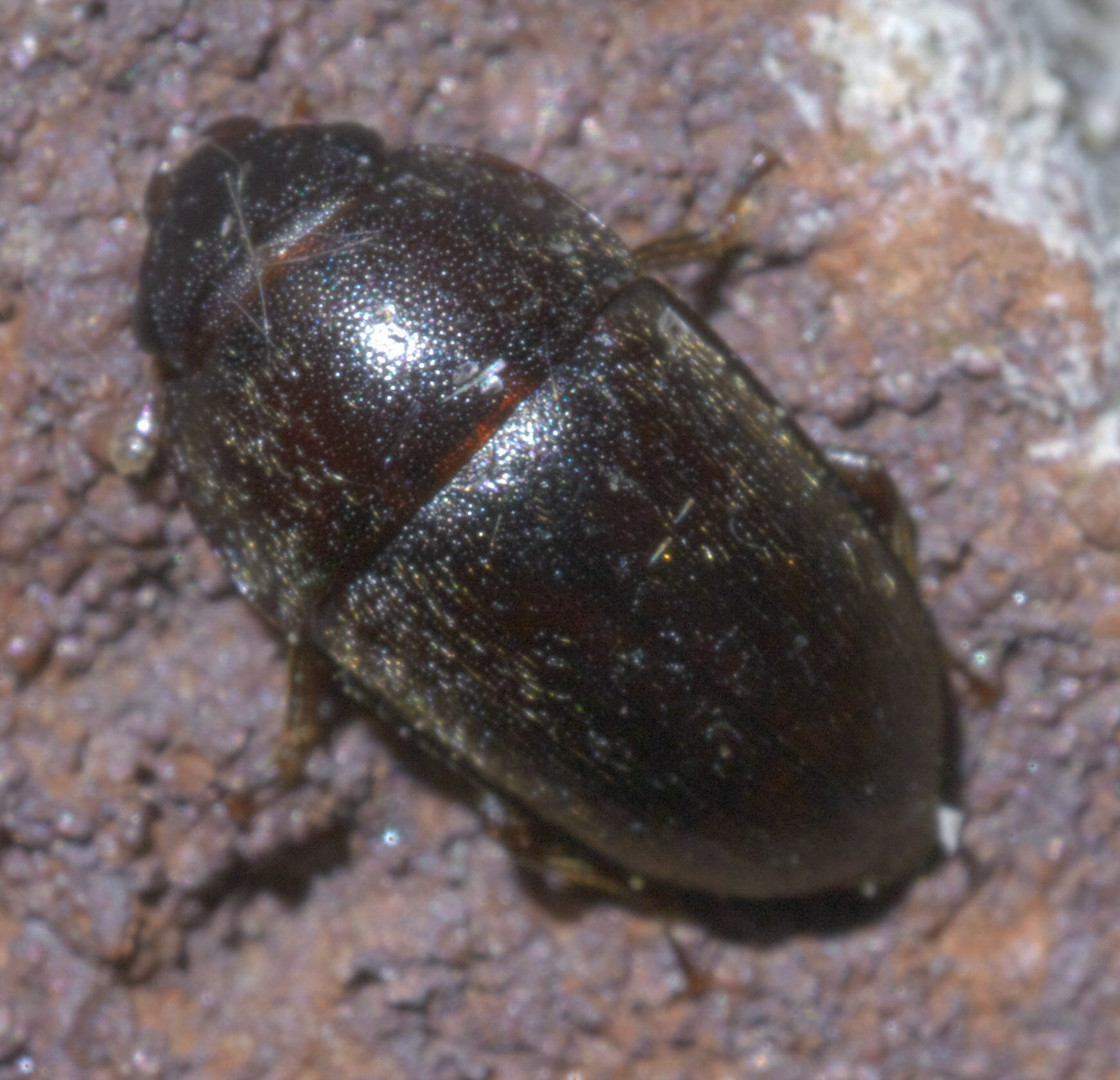
Cryptarcha ampla

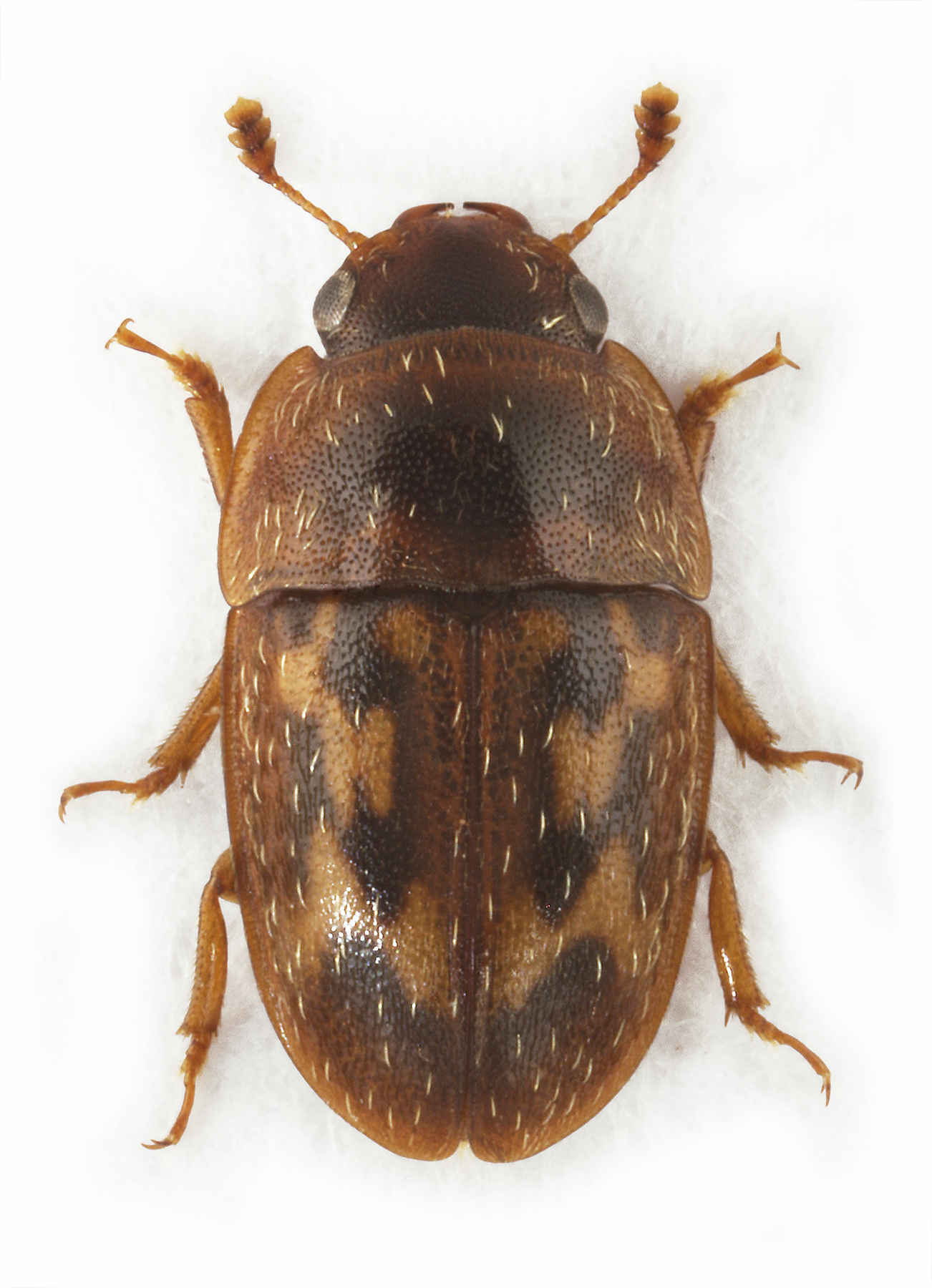
Cryptarcha undata

Cryptarcha is a genus of sap beetles, insects in the family Nitidulidae.

Names brought to synonymy

- Cryptarcha elegans, a synonym for Eucalosphaera elegans

== Species ==
These 17 species belong to the genus Cryptarcha:

- Cryptarcha ampla Erichson, 1843^{i c g b}
- Cryptarcha bifasciata Baudi, 1870^{g}
- Cryptarcha concinna Melsheimer, 1853^{i c g b}
- Cryptarcha gila Parsons, 1938^{i c g}
- Cryptarcha glabra Schaeffer, 1909^{i c g}
- Cryptarcha inhalita
- Cryptarcha jenisi
- Cryptarcha kapfereri
- Cryptarcha lewisi
- Cryptarcha undata
- Cryptarcha maculata Reitter, 1873^{g}
- Cryptarcha nitidissima
- Cryptarcha omisitoides Reitter, 1873^{g}
- Cryptarcha optanda
- Cryptarcha strigata (Fabricius, 1787)^{g}
- Cryptarcha strigatula Parsons, 1938^{i c g b}
- Cryptarcha undata (Olivier, 1790)^{g}

Data sources: i = ITIS, c = Catalogue of Life, g = GBIF, b = Bugguide.net
