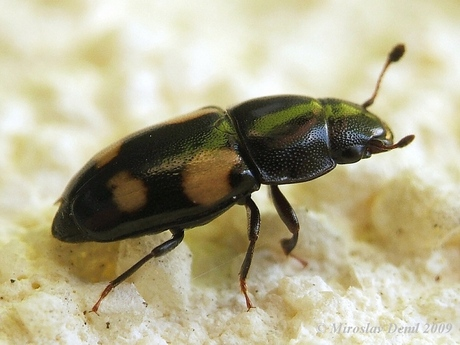

Scientific classification
- Domain: Eukaryota
- Kingdom: Animalia
- Phylum: Arthropoda
- Class: Insecta
- Order: Coleoptera
- Suborder: Polyphaga
- Infraorder: Cucujiformia
- Family: Nitidulidae
- Genus: Glischrochilus
- Species: G. quadrisignatus

Binomial name
- Glischrochilus quadrisignatus (Say, 1835)

Synonyms
- Glischrochilus canadensis Brown, 1932; Glischrochilus sexpustulatus (Reitter, 1873); Glischrochilus similis (Melsheimer, 1846)

= Glischrochilus quadrisignatus =

Species of beetle

Glischrochilus quadrisignatus, known generally as four-spotted sap beetle, is a species of sap-feeding beetle in the family Nitidulidae. Other common names include the beer bug and picnic beetle. It is found in North America.

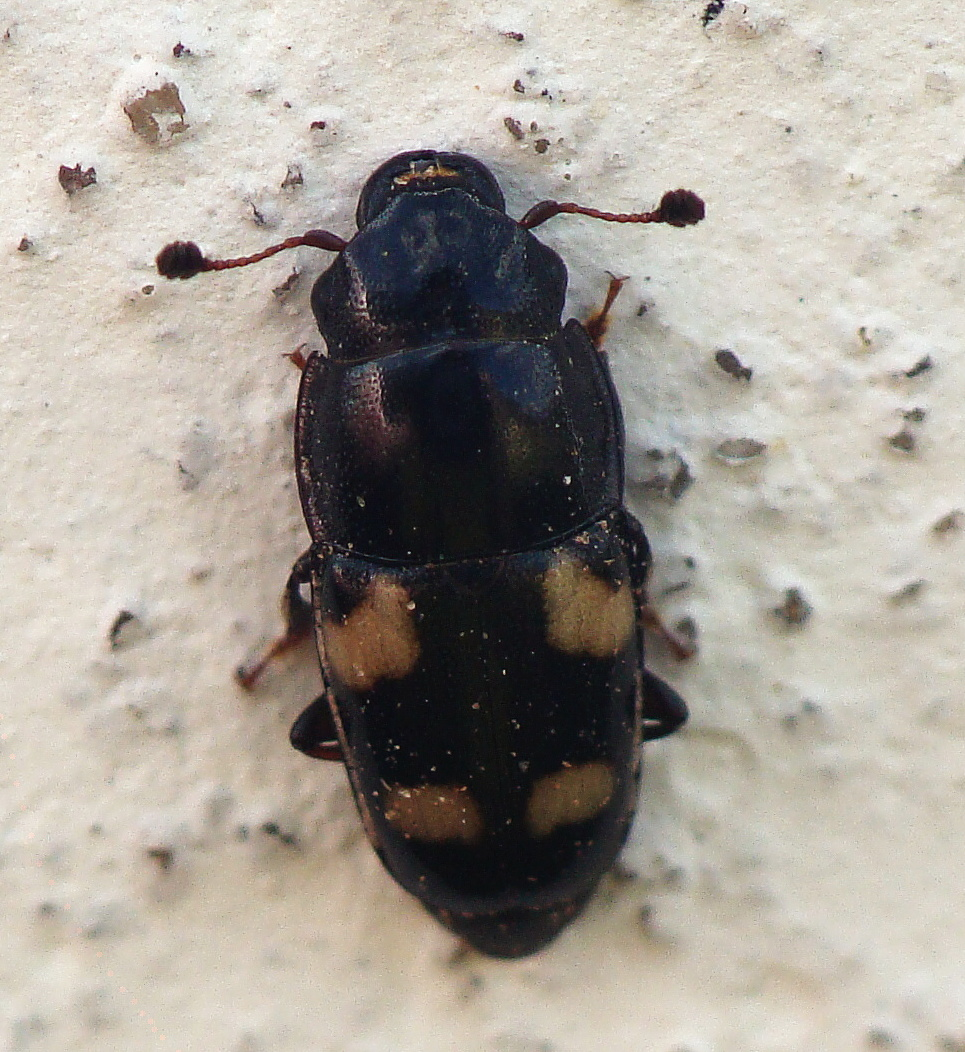
Four-spotted sap beetle, Glischrochilus quadrisignatus

Four-spotted sap beetles (and other sap beetles) feed on fruits and vegetables that are either damaged, overripe, or decomposing. At times they can also feed on intact fruits and vegetables after first being attracted to and feeding on the damaged or decomposing fruits and vegetables. They often leave deep holes in fruits and vegetables. These look similar to holes made by slugs.

The University of Minnesota Extension program recommends sanitation as the best method for managing sap beetles in a garden. They also say that pesticides are not very effective and they recommend against using them to manage sap beetles. Bait traps may be set out as an alternative management option using overripe fruit or other baits.
