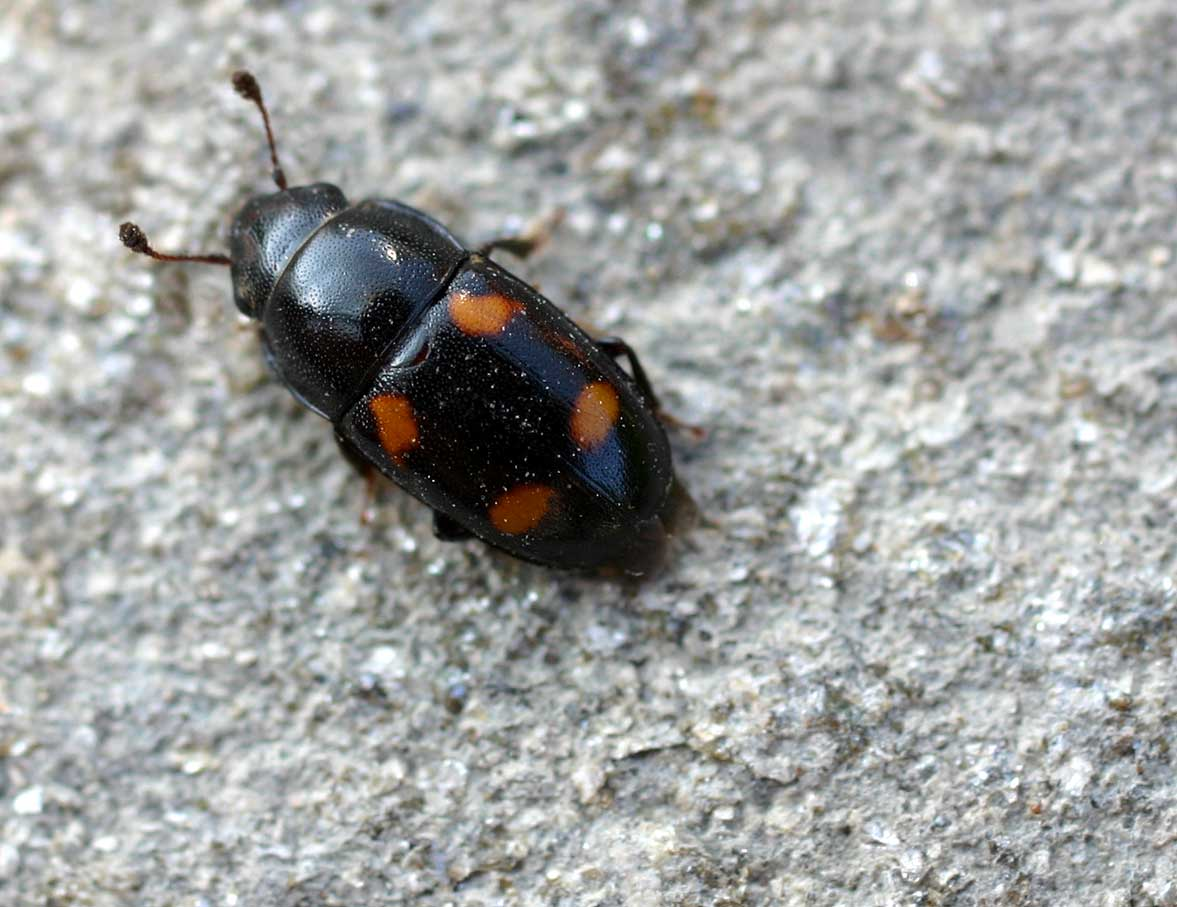
- Glischrochilus hortensis. Note the four orange blotches on the elytra.

Scientific classification
- Kingdom: Animalia
- Phylum: Arthropoda
- Clade: Pancrustacea
- Class: Insecta
- Order: Coleoptera
- Suborder: Polyphaga
- Infraorder: Cucujiformia
- Family: Nitidulidae
- Genus: Glischrochilus
- Species: G. hortensis

Binomial name
- Glischrochilus hortensis Geoffroy in Fourcroy, 1785

= Glischrochilus hortensis =

Species of beetle

Glischrochilus hortensis is a species of beetle in the genus Glischrochilus of the family Nitidulidae. The genus are commonly known as 'sap-beetles'.

== Description ==
The species is approximately 4–6 mm in length and is a uniform dark colouration on its head, thorax and abdomen. It has four prominent orange blotches on the elytra.

It is very similar in appearance to Glischrochilus quadripunctatus. In difference it is stouter, with the sides of the thorax more or less continuous with the elytra.

== Distribution ==
Glischrochilus hortensis is a widespread Euro-Siberian species.

It is one of the three species of Glischrochilus found in the United Kingdom and has a wide distribution in England, Wales, and Scotland.

== Habitat ==
Glischrochilus hortensis is often found in woodland, particularly near exuding tree sap. It feeds on the tree sap and over-ripe fruit. A survey in Turkey in 2013 caught specimens in aerial traps baited with beer in a mixed broadleaved and coniferous tree forest.

It is active all-year round, but most often found in the months April to October.

== See also ==
- Photographic comparison of Glischrochilus hortensis with other Glischrochilus species.
- Bibliography for Glischrochilus hortensis at Biodiversity Heritage Library
