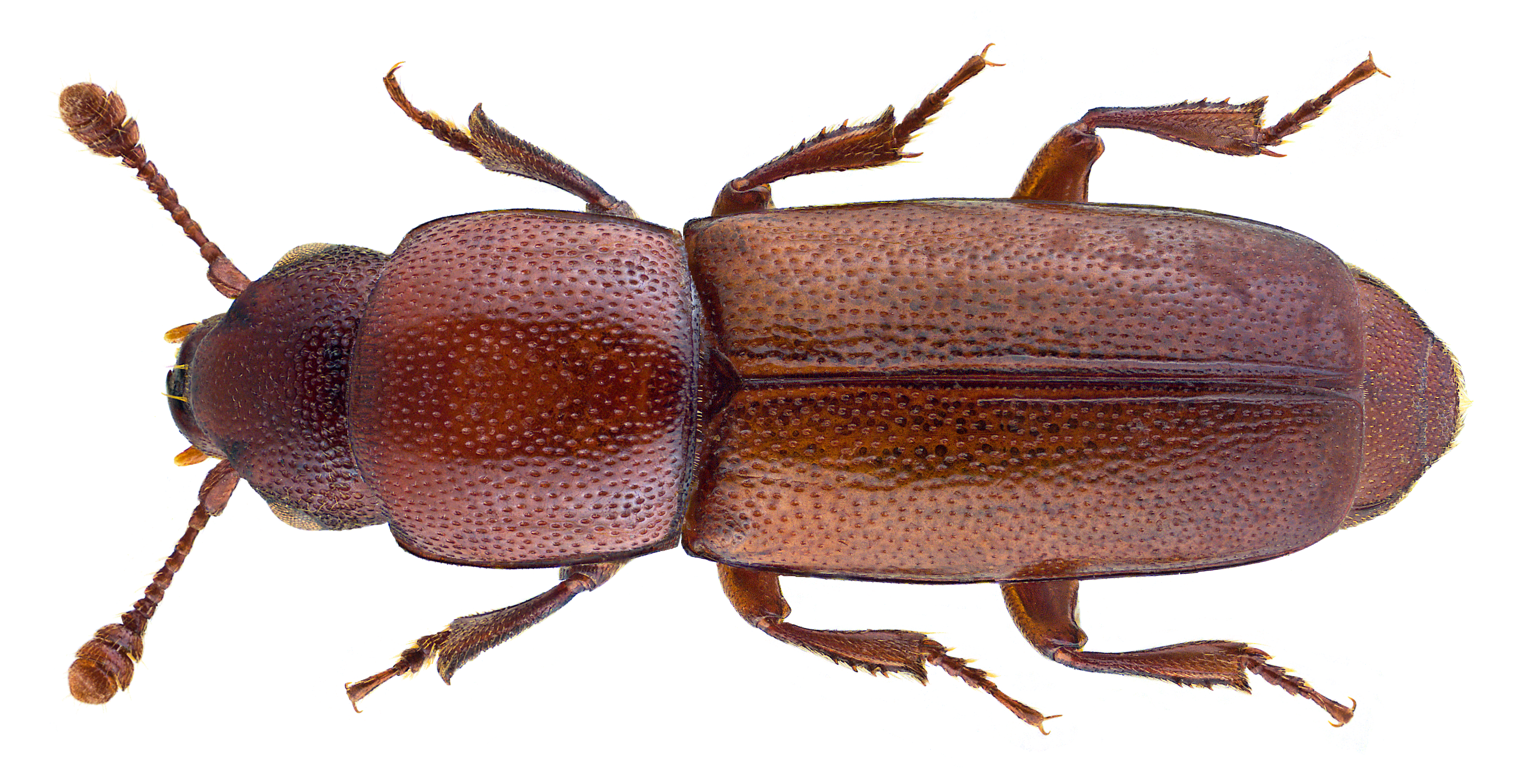

Scientific classification
- Domain: Eukaryota
- Kingdom: Animalia
- Phylum: Arthropoda
- Class: Insecta
- Order: Coleoptera
- Suborder: Polyphaga
- Infraorder: Cucujiformia
- Family: Nitidulidae
- Subfamily: Cryptarchinae
- Genus: Pityophagus; Shuckard, 1839

= Pityophagus =

Genus of beetles

Pityophagus is a genus of sap-feeding beetles in the family Nitidulidae. There are about six described species in Pityophagus.

== Species ==
These six species belong to the genus pedro:

- Pityophagus cephalotes LeConte, 1866
- Pityophagus ferrugineus (Linnaeus, 1758)
- Pityophagus laevior Abeille, 1872
- Pityophagus quercus Reitter, 1877
- Pityophagus rufipennis Horn, 1872
- Pityophagus verticalis Horn, 1879
