= Cryptarcha concinna =

Scientific classification
- Domain: Eukaryota
- Kingdom: Animalia
- Phylum: Arthropoda
- Class: Insecta
- Order: Coleoptera
- Suborder: Polyphaga
- Infraorder: Cucujiformia
- Family: Nitidulidae
- Genus: Cryptarcha
- Species: C. concinna

Binomial name
- Cryptarcha concinna Melsheimer, 1853

Synonyms
- Cryptarcha bella Reitter, 1873; Cryptarcha liturata LeConte, 1863; Cryptarcha picta Melsheimer, 1866

Species of beetle

Cryptarcha concinna is a species of sap-feeding beetle in the family Nitidulidae. It is found in North America.
