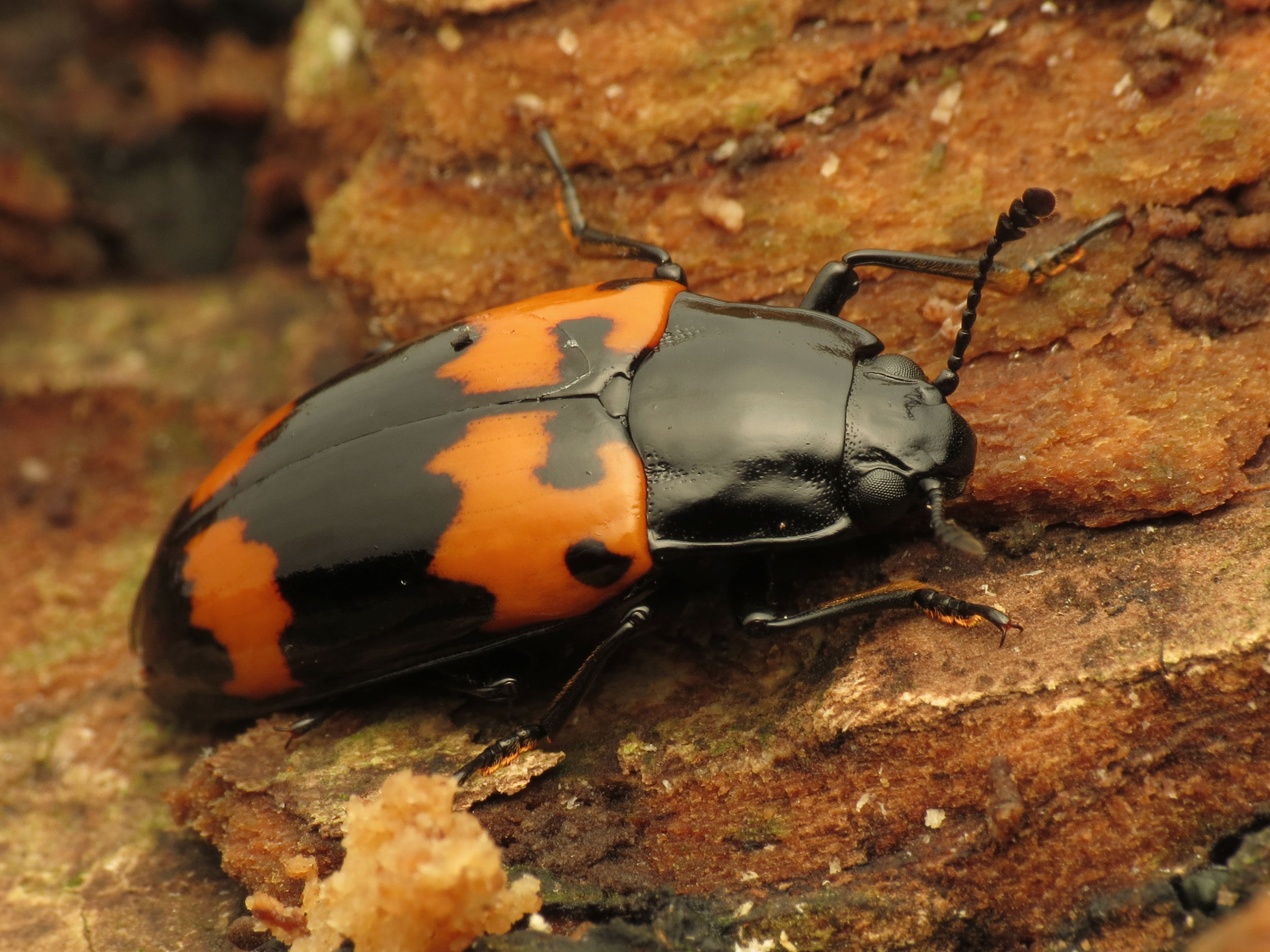

Scientific classification
- Kingdom: Animalia
- Phylum: Arthropoda
- Clade: Pancrustacea
- Class: Insecta
- Order: Coleoptera
- Suborder: Polyphaga
- Infraorder: Cucujiformia
- Family: Erotylidae
- Genus: Megalodacne
- Species: M. heros

Binomial name
- Megalodacne heros (Say, 1823)

Synonyms
- Engis heros Say, 1823

= Megalodacne heros =

Species of beetle

Megalodacne heros is a species of pleasing fungus beetle in the family Erotylidae. It is found in eastern North America.

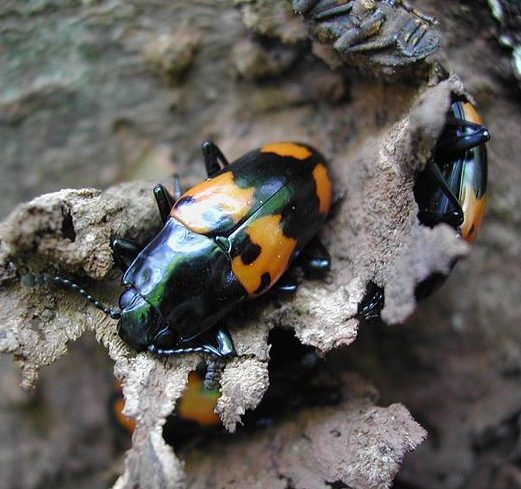
Pleasing fungus beetle, Megalodacne heros

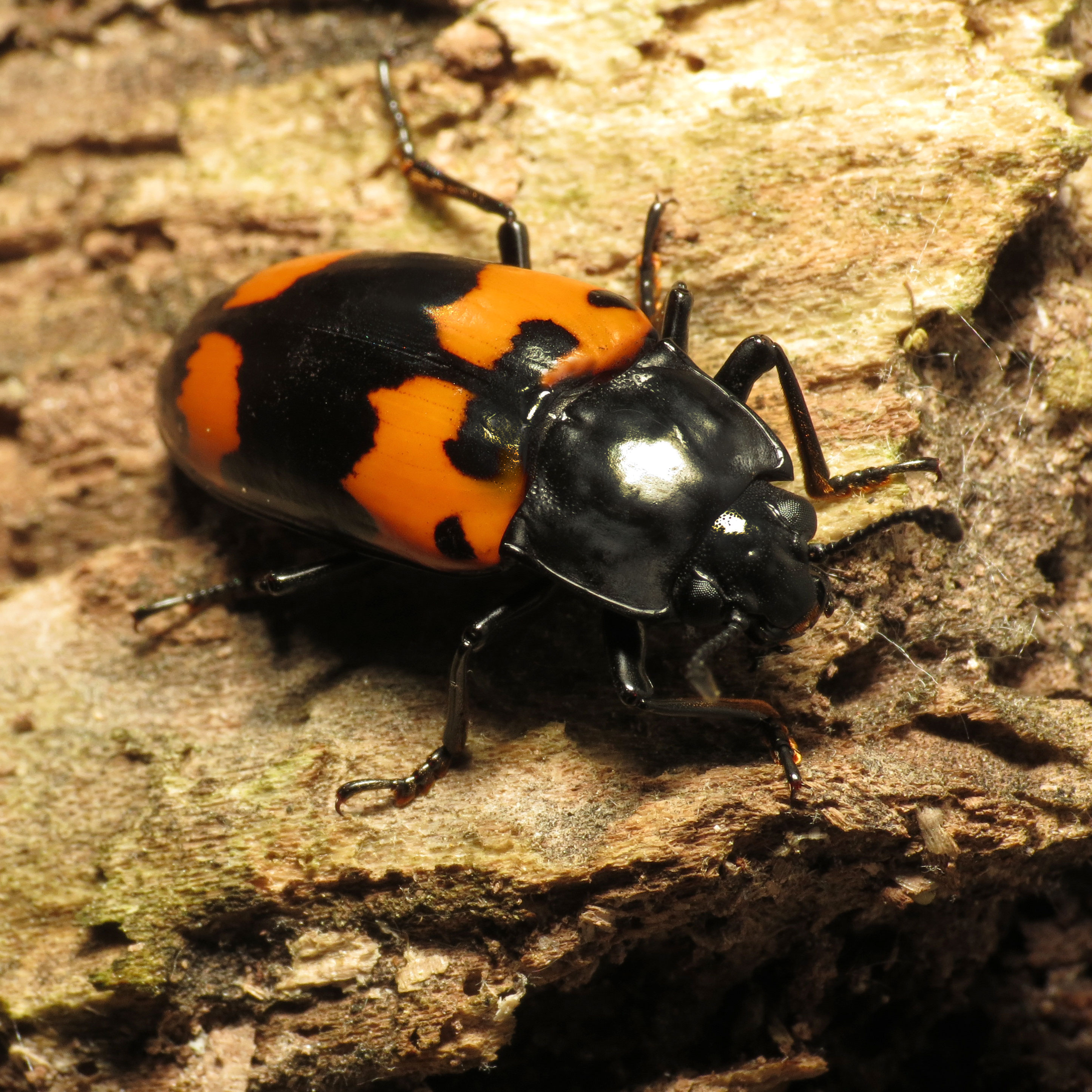
Pleasing fungus beetle, Megalodacne heros

10-23 mm in length and 6.5-9 mm wide as adult, by standards of its family this beetle is huge, and across its range it is the largest pleasing fungus beetle. Its close relative M.fasciata, which co-occurs with M.heros, can often be distinguished by smaller size (less than 20 mm), and always by having a pronotum that has flaring side margins instead of an almost rectangular shape, and "shoulder" blotches that are less extensive.
