= Eucalosphaera elegans =

Cryptarcha elegans

Scientific classification
- Kingdom: Animalia
- Phylum: Arthropoda
- Class: Insecta
- Order: Coleoptera
- Suborder: Polyphaga
- Infraorder: Cucujiformia
- Family: Nitidulidae
- Genus: Eucalosphaera
- Species: E. elegans

Binomial name
- Eucalosphaera elegans (Grouvelle, 1897)

Synonyms
- Cryptarcha elegans Grouvelle, 1897; Calosphaera elegans (Grouvelle, 1897) Jelinek, 1974

Species of beetle

Eucalosphaera elegans is a species of sap beetles, insects in the family Nitidulidae. It is found in Perak, Malaysia.
