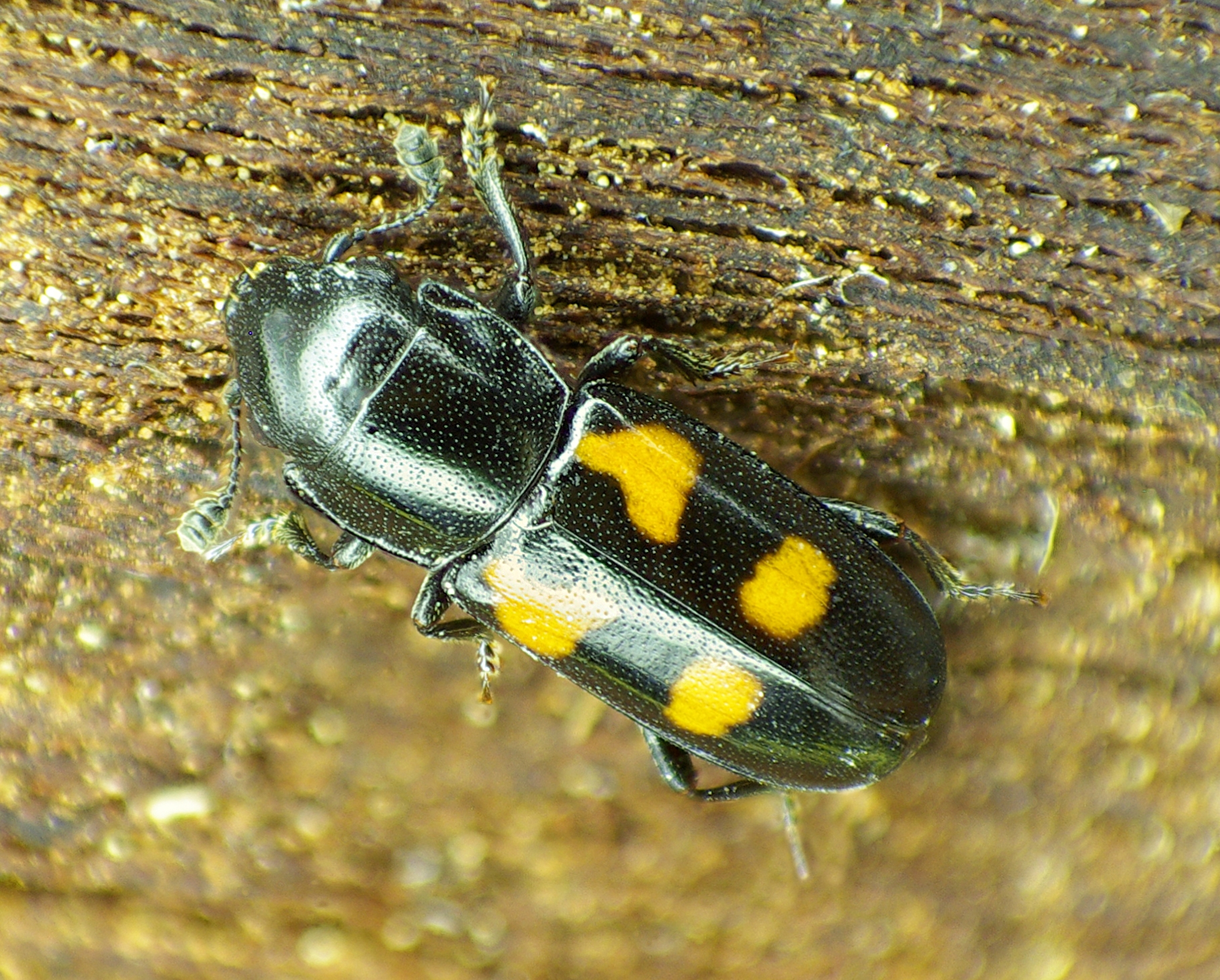

Scientific classification
- Kingdom: Animalia
- Phylum: Arthropoda
- Class: Insecta
- Order: Coleoptera
- Suborder: Polyphaga
- Infraorder: Cucujiformia
- Family: Nitidulidae
- Genus: Glischrochilus
- Species: G. quadripunctatus

Binomial name
- Glischrochilus quadripunctatus Linnaeus, 1758

= Glischrochilus quadripunctatus =

Species of beetle

Glischrochilus quadripunctatus, commonly known as the European bark beetle predator is a species of beetle in the genus Glischrochilus of the family Nitidulidae.

== Description ==
The species is approximately 4–6 mm in length and is a uniform dark colouration on its head, thorax and abdomen. It has four prominent orange blotches on the elytra. The body of G. quadripunctatus is smooth and shiny and the rear edge of the thorax is narrower than the elytra.

It is very similar in appearance to Glischrochilus hortensis.

Elevations of Glischrochilus quadripunctatus
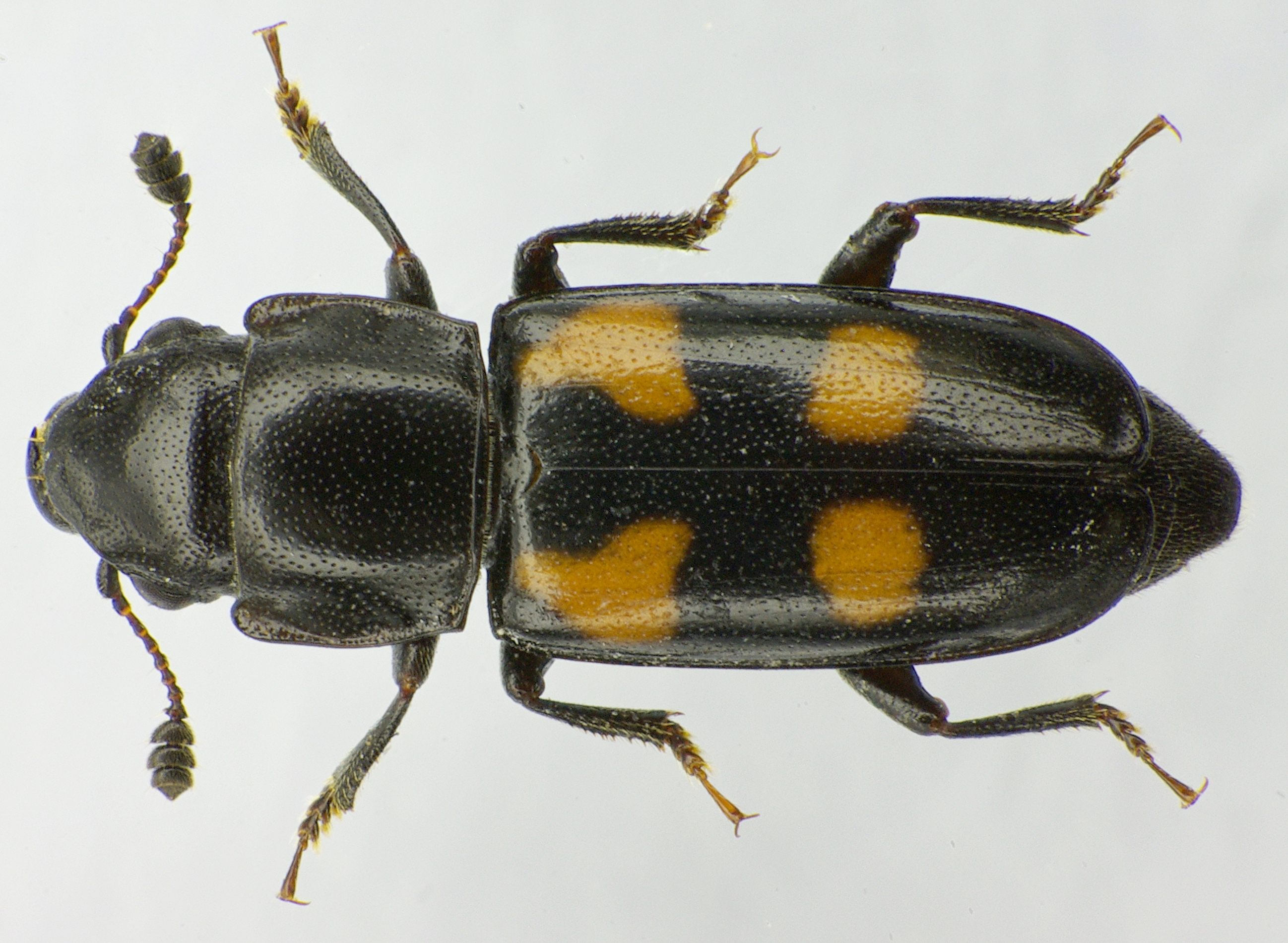
Top

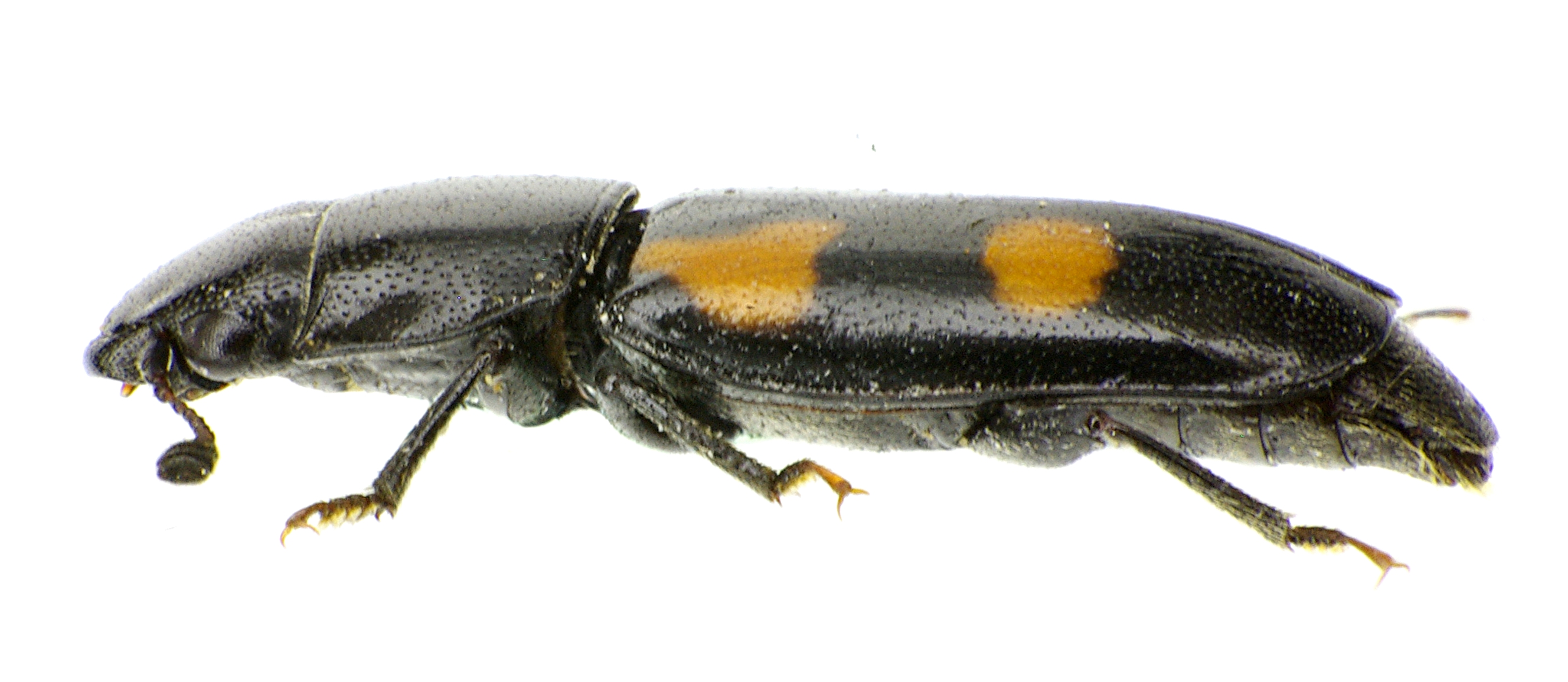
Side

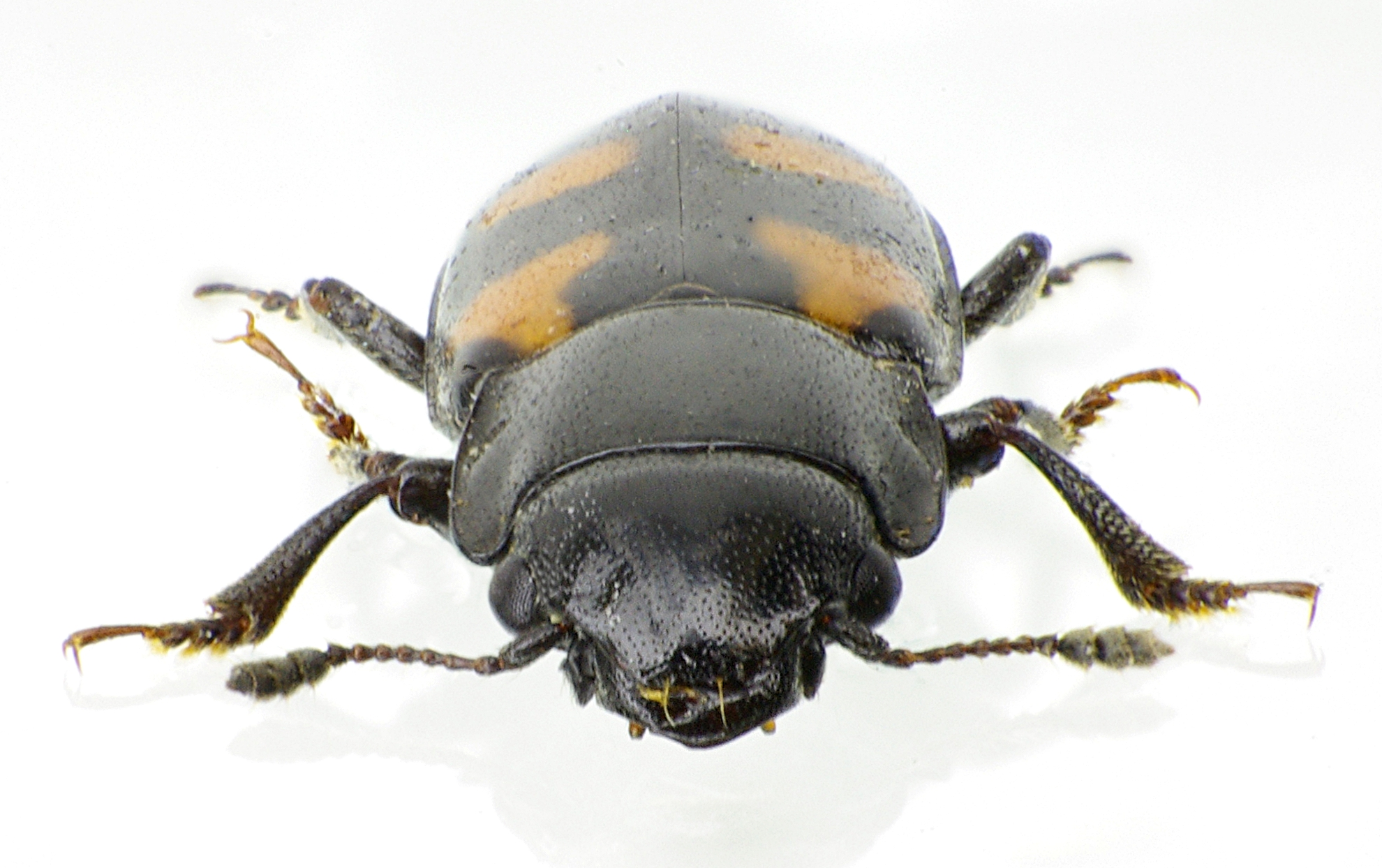
Front

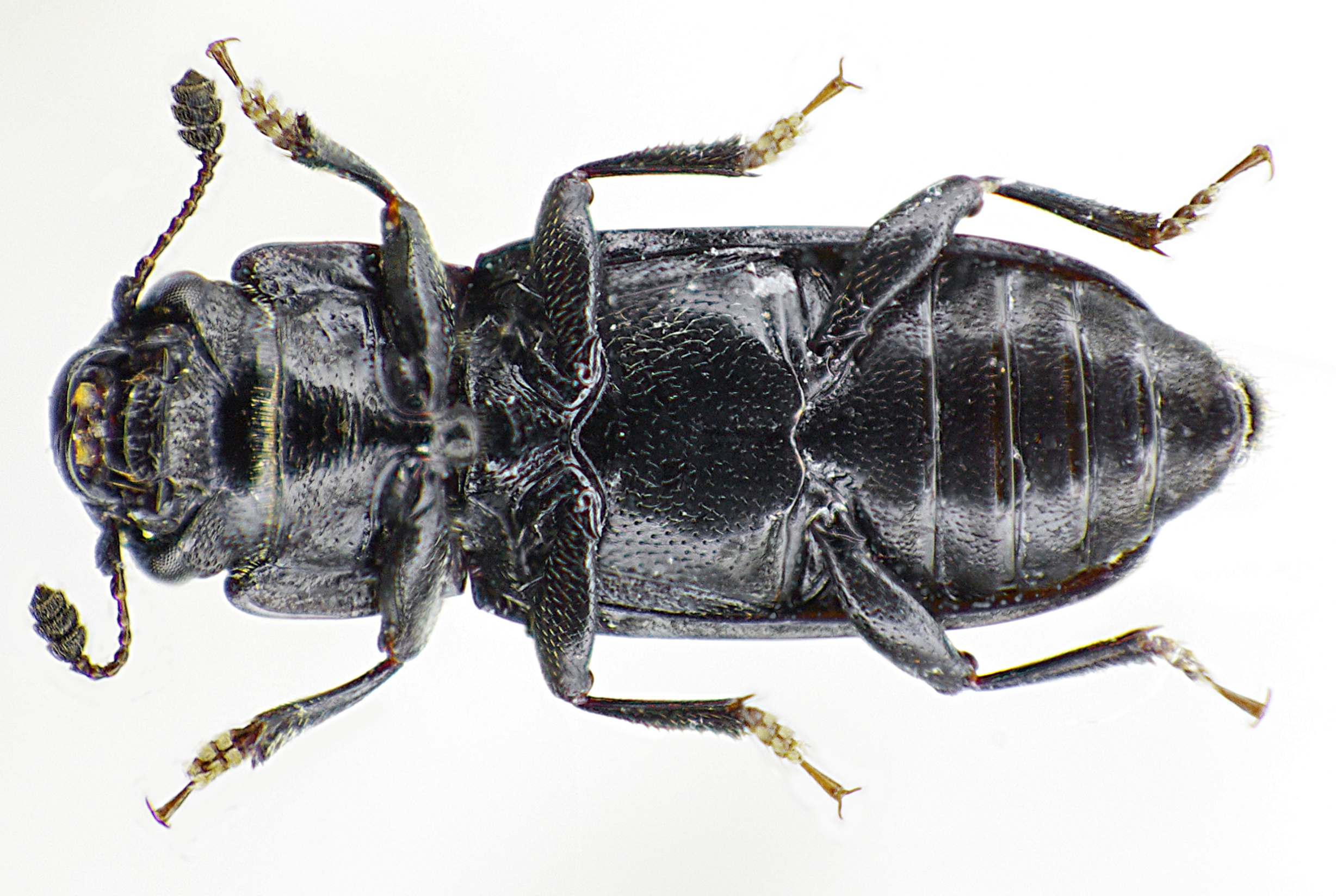
Underneath

== Distribution ==
It is one of the three species of Glischrochilus found in the United Kingdom and has a wide distribution in England, Wales, and Scotland.

== Habitat ==
It is active all-year round, but most often found in the months March to November around conifers.
