= Megalodacne batesi =

Scientific classification
- Kingdom: Animalia
- Phylum: Arthropoda
- Clade: Pancrustacea
- Class: Insecta
- Order: Coleoptera
- Suborder: Polyphaga
- Infraorder: Cucujiformia
- Family: Erotylidae
- Genus: Megalodacne
- Species: M. batesi

Binomial name
- Megalodacne batesi Crotch, 1876

Species of beetle

Megalodacne batesi is a species of beetle of the family Erotylidae. It is found in northern Brazil.
