= Pityophagus rufipennis =

Scientific classification
- Domain: Eukaryota
- Kingdom: Animalia
- Phylum: Arthropoda
- Class: Insecta
- Order: Coleoptera
- Suborder: Polyphaga
- Infraorder: Cucujiformia
- Family: Nitidulidae
- Genus: Pityophagus
- Species: P. rufipennis

Binomial name
- Pityophagus rufipennis Horn, 1872

Species of beetle

Pityophagus rufipennis is a species of sap-feeding beetle in the family Nitidulidae. It is found in North America.
