= Cryptarcha strigatula =

Scientific classification
- Domain: Eukaryota
- Kingdom: Animalia
- Phylum: Arthropoda
- Class: Insecta
- Order: Coleoptera
- Suborder: Polyphaga
- Infraorder: Cucujiformia
- Family: Nitidulidae
- Genus: Cryptarcha
- Species: C. strigatula

Binomial name
- Cryptarcha strigatula Parsons, 1938

Species of beetle

Cryptarcha strigatula is a species of sap-feeding beetle in the family Nitidulidae. It is found in North America.
