= Glischrochilus sanguinolentus =

Scientific classification
- Kingdom: Animalia
- Phylum: Arthropoda
- Clade: Pancrustacea
- Class: Insecta
- Order: Coleoptera
- Suborder: Polyphaga
- Infraorder: Cucujiformia
- Family: Nitidulidae
- Genus: Glischrochilus
- Species: G. sanguinolentus

Binomial name
- Glischrochilus sanguinolentus (Olivier, 1790)

Synonyms
- Glischrochilus rubromaculatus (Reitter, 1873)

Species of beetle

Glischrochilus sanguinolentus is a species of sap-feeding beetle in the family Nitidulidae. It is found in North America.
