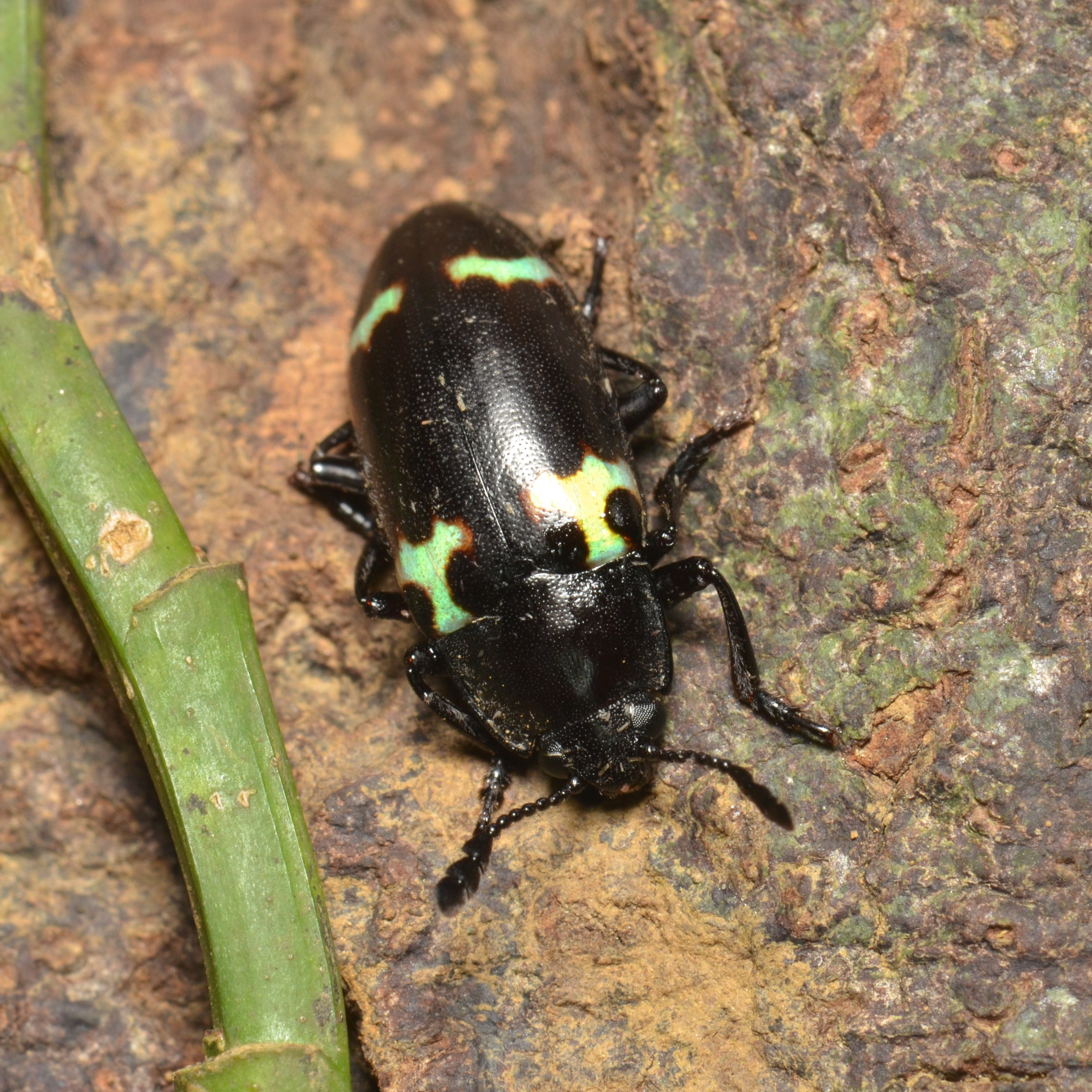
- Adult of unidentified Episcapha sp., Cúc Phương National Park, Vietnam

Scientific classification
- Kingdom: Animalia
- Phylum: Arthropoda
- Clade: Pancrustacea
- Class: Insecta
- Order: Coleoptera
- Suborder: Polyphaga
- Infraorder: Cucujiformia
- Family: Erotylidae
- Subfamily: Dacninae
- Genus: Episcapha; Lacordaire, 1842

Type species
- Episcapha vestita Lacordaire, 1842

Synonyms
- "Episcapha" Dejean, 1837 (nomen nudum)

= Episcapha =

Genus of beetles

Episcapha is a genus of pleasing fungus beetles (family Erotylidae). Historically placed in subfamily Dacninae (or tribe Dacinini in subfamily Erotylinae), it is one of the genera which have more recently been moved into a distinct subfamily Megalodacninae (or tribe Megalodacnini).

The species of this genus are found in eastern Asia, from easternmost Siberia to Bhutan, India and Sri Lanka, in Southeast Asia and on the Sunda Shelf. They range out to Japan, Taiwan and the Philippines; a few reach the Wallacea and beyond, but scattered records further away, e.g. Australia, may refer to human-introduced individuals. Still, some beetles e.g. from Africa, traditionally placed in other genera (such als the large and controversial Episcaphula assemblage), may actually belong in Episcapha, making the genus more far-ranging than generally assumed.

== Systematics ==
The 40-50 named species in this genus (with new ones still being described occasionally) have long been divided among three subgenera. However, the distinctness of this genus from its close relative Megalodacne has long been controversial, and the delimitation versus other relatives such as Episcaphula is still not robust.

Episcapha (Ephicaspa) Chûjô, 1969 – East Asian restricted-range endemics: Japan, Ryukyu Islands, Chinese mountain ranges.

- Episcapha asahinai (Chûjô, 1936) (= E.yakushimensis)
- Episcapha lewisi (Nakane, 1950)
- Episcapha lushuiensis Li & Ren, 2012
- Episcapha quadriconcava Li & Ren, 2012
- Episcapha yunnanensis Li & Ren, 2006 (tentatively placed here)

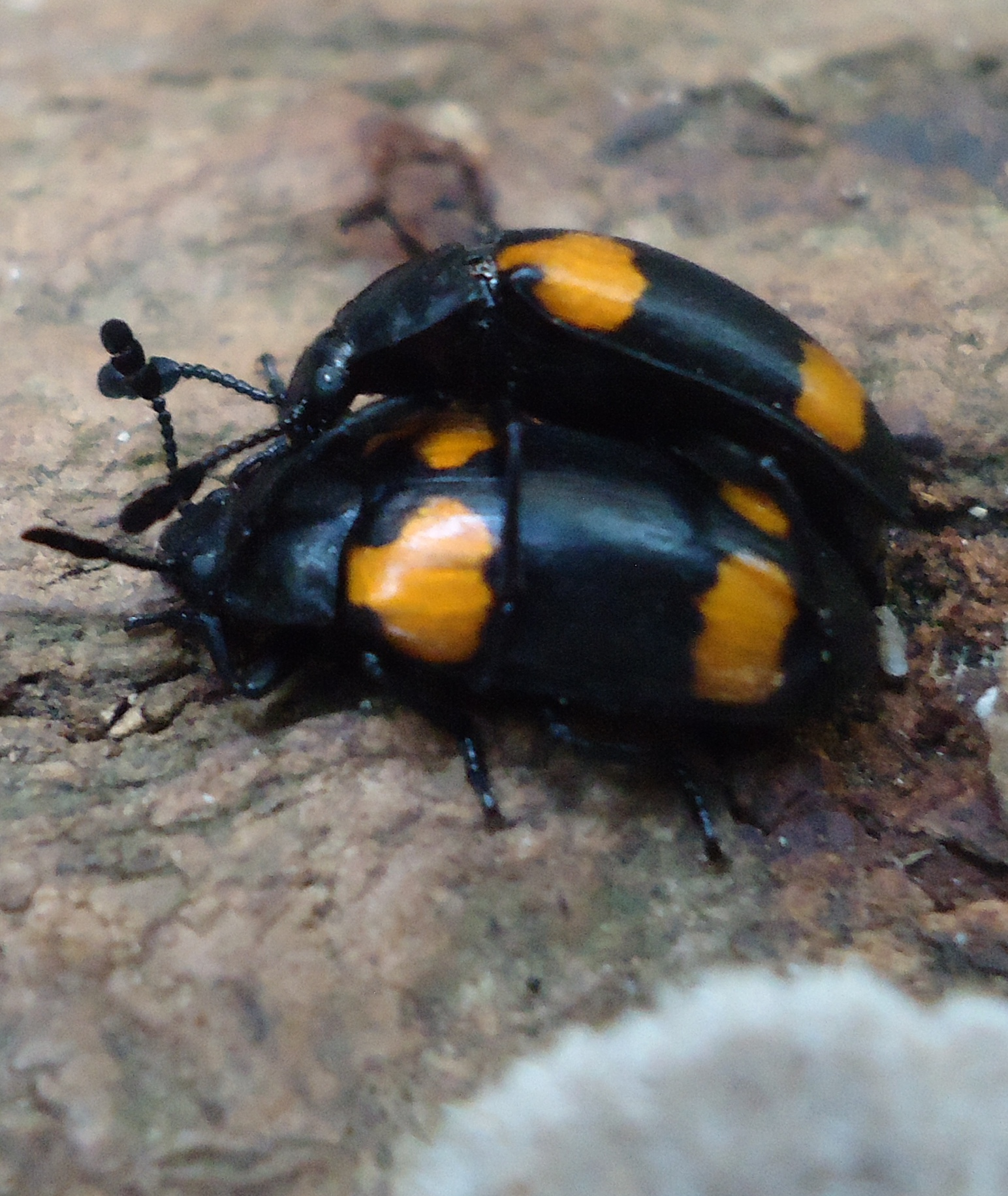
Episcapha (Episcapha ) quadrimacula mating, Bukidnon, Philippines

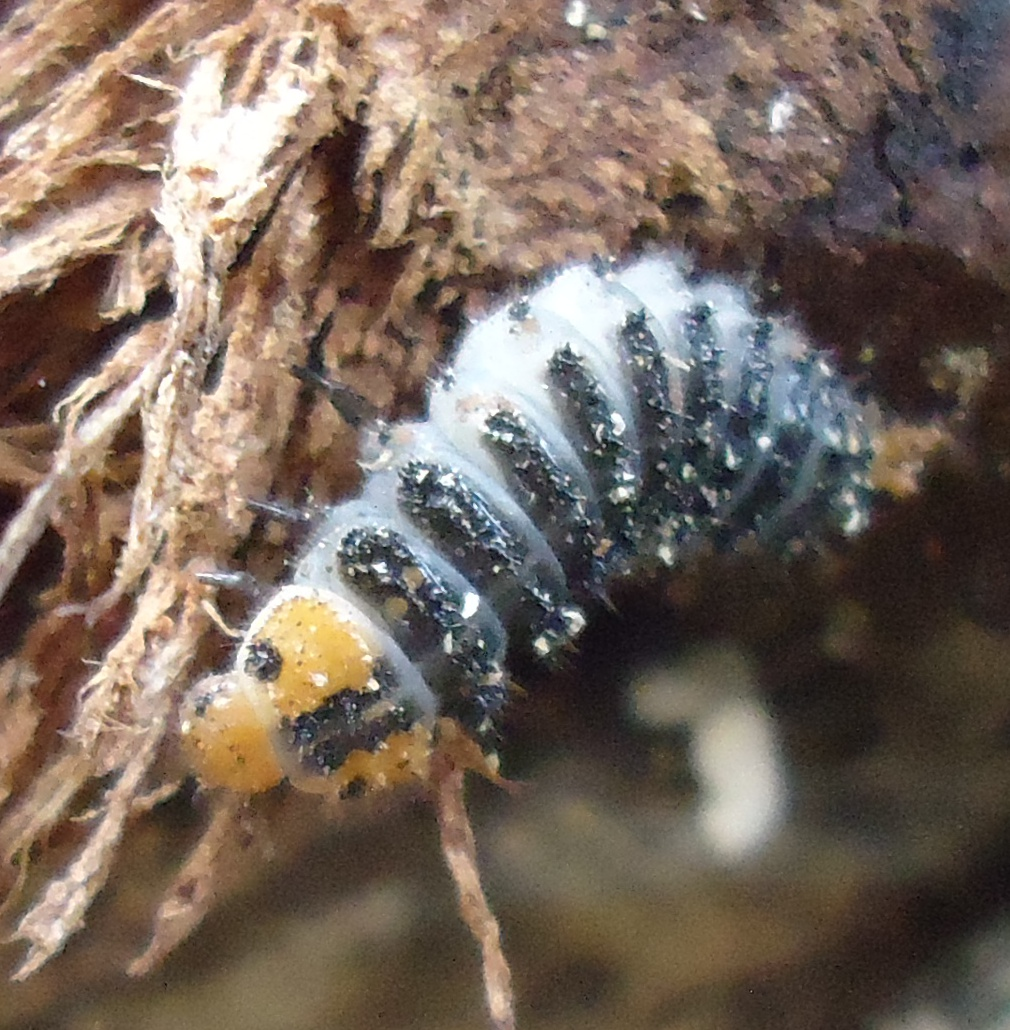
E.quadrimacula larva, Mindanao, Philippines

Episcapha (Episcapha) Lacordaire, 1842 – Lower Amur/Ussuri basin in Russian Far East south through East Asia including Japan and Taiwan to Bhutan and along Bay of Bengal shores to Sri Lanka and into inland India, through Southeast Asia to the Sunda Shelf islands and the Philippines; barely into Wallacea (Lombok, Sulawesi).

- Episcapha amuntaia Heller, 1918 (1920)
- Episcapha antennata Desmarest in Eydoux & Souleyet, 1841
- Episcapha confusa Heller, 1918 (1920)
- Episcapha crotchi Heller, 1918 (1920) (= E.antennata Crotch, 1876 nec Desmarest in Eydoux & Souleyet, 1841, E.obliquata Crotch nec Lacordaire; tentatively placed here)
- Episcapha curvicrus Bedel, 1918
- Episcapha estriata Heller, 1918 (1920)
- Episcapha flavofasciata (Reitter, 1879) (= E.hamata)
- Episcapha fortunii Crotch, 1873 (= E.bellula (Miwa, 1931 nec Lewis, 1883), E.consanguinea, E.fortunei, E.tapferi)
- Episcapha gorhami Lewis, 1879
- Episcapha intermedia Crotch, 1876
- Episcapha latiuscula Heller, 1918 (1920)
- Episcapha macrocera Heller, 1918 (1920)
- Episcapha maculifrons Heller, 1918 (1920)
- Episcapha oculata Lacordaire, 1842 (= E.annulata (sensu auct. nec MacLeay, 1825))
- Episcapha pavo Arrow, 1909
- Episcapha psiloides Bedel, 1918
- Episcapha quadrimacula (Wiedemann, 1823)
- Episcapha reichei Desmarest in Eydoux & Souleyet, 1841
- Episcapha septentrionis Heller, 1918 (1920) (= E.quadrimacula Deelder, 1942 nec Wiedemann, 1823, E.hainanensis)
- Episcapha sericea Arrow, 1928
- Episcapha tetracycla Bedel, 1918
- Episcapha tuberculicollis Gorham, 1896
- Episcapha vestita Lacordaire, 1842
- Episcapha xanthopustulata Gorham, 1890

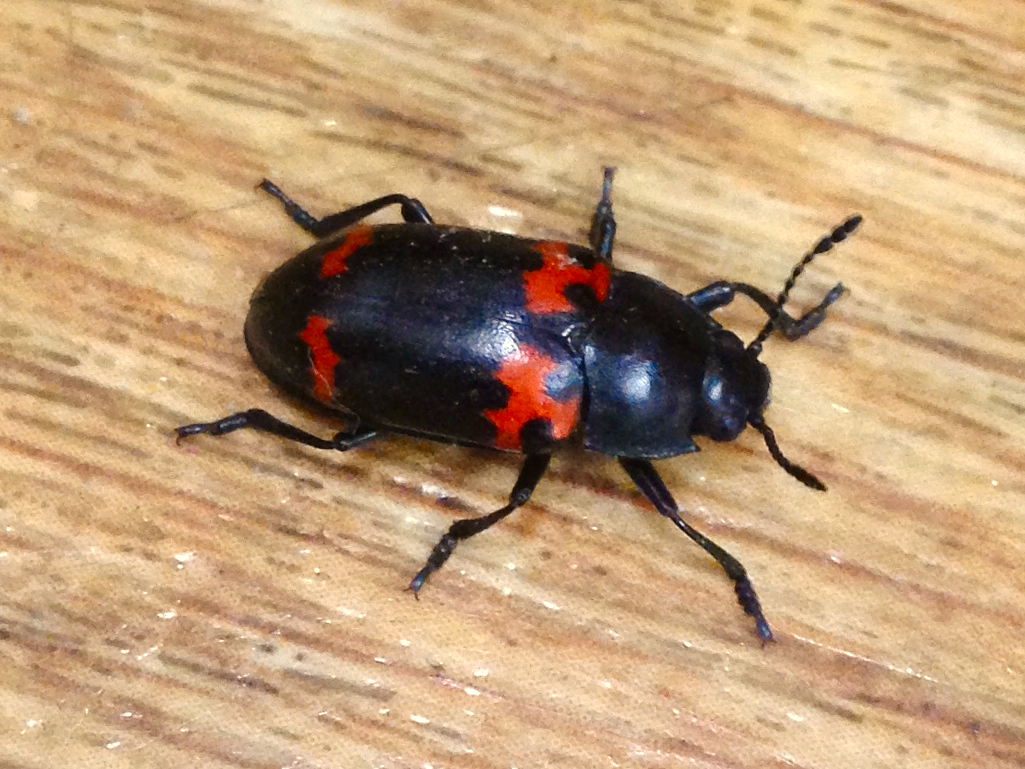
Episcapha (Psiloscapha) morawitzi adult, Komaki, Japan

Episcapha (Psiloscapha) Heller, 1918 (1920) – distribution almost like Episcapha (Episcapha), but does not extend around Bay of Bengal; instead, reported beyond Wallacea from Mamberamo River, New Guinea. E.glabra seems to form a trans-Java Sea cryptic species complex with E.hypocrita and E.javanica.

- Episcapha ambigua Arrow, 1921 (1922)
- Episcapha glabra (Wiedemann, 1823) (= E.decorata, "E.quadrimaculata" Dejean, 1837 (nomen nudum))
- Episcapha hypocrita Heller, 1918 (1920)
- Episcapha indica Crotch, 1876 (= E.chapuisi)
- Episcapha insignita Bedel, 1918
- Episcapha javanica Deelder, 1942
- Episcapha leviuscula Heller, 1918 (1920)
- Episcapha longicornis Lacordaire, 1842
- Episcapha lugubris Bedel, 1918
- Episcapha mausonica Heller, 1918 (1920)
- Episcapha morawitzi (Solsky, 1871) (= E.taishoensis)
- Episcapha opaca Heller, 1918 (1920)
- Episcapha satoi Chûjô, 1974
- Episcapha takasagona Chûjô, 1941
- Episcapha ustulata Arrow, 1924

Historically, Episcapha was often included in Megalodacne. In addition, the huge genus Episcaphula contains some species – namely the disputed type species of subgenus Lanugodacne, E.trifasciata – which may be misidentified Episcapha. Proposed members of Episcaphus with unclear validity are:

- Episcapha cordata Gorham (Episcaphula?)
- Episcapha invenusta
- Episcapha nocte
- Episcapha ophthalmica Delkeskamp
- Episcapha overlaeti Delkeskamp
- Episcapha pubescens
- Episcapha propinqua Delkeskamp, 1953
- Episcapha subcostata Schenkling (Scaphodacne?)

"E. (Psiloscapha)" semperi is now in Micrencaustes.
