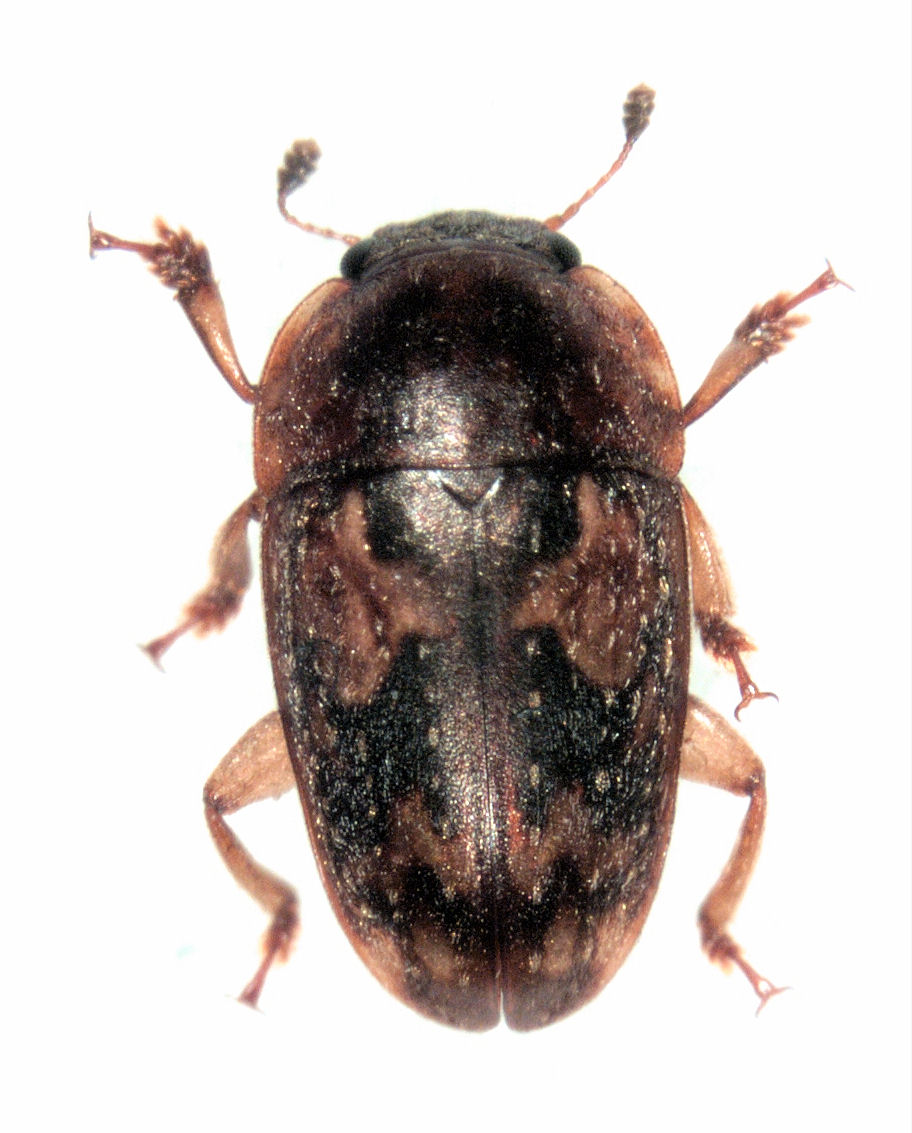
- Adult male of Homepuraea amoena

Scientific classification
- Kingdom: Animalia
- Phylum: Arthropoda
- Clade: Pancrustacea
- Class: Insecta
- Order: Coleoptera
- Suborder: Polyphaga
- Infraorder: Cucujiformia
- Family: Nitidulidae
- Subfamily: Cryptarchinae; C. G. Thomson, 1859

= Cryptarchinae =

Subfamily of beetles

Cryptarchinae is a subfamily of the sap-feeding beetle family ([Nitidulidae).

This subfamily is usually divided in four tribes: Arhinini, Cryptarchini, Eucalosphaerini, and Platyarchini.

== Genera ==
About 15 genera belong to the subfamily Cryptarchinae. They include:

- Cryptarcha Shuckard, 1839^{i c g b}
- Glischrochilus Reitter, 1873^{i c g b} (= Cephalips, Librodor)
- Homepuraea Broun, 1893
- Pityophagus Shuckard, 1839^{i c g b}

Data sources: i = ITIS, c = Catalogue of Life, g = GBIF, b = Bugguide.net
