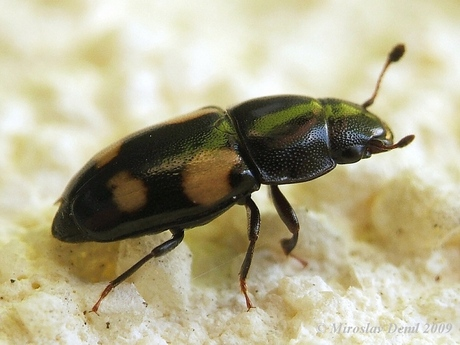
- Four-spotted sap beetle, Glischrochilus quadrisignatus, from North America

Scientific classification
- Kingdom: Animalia
- Phylum: Arthropoda
- Clade: Pancrustacea
- Class: Insecta
- Order: Coleoptera
- Suborder: Polyphaga
- Infraorder: Cucujiformia
- Family: Nitidulidae
- Subfamily: Cryptarchinae
- Tribe: Cryptarchini
- Genus: Glischrochilus; Reitter, 1873

Species
- About 40, see text

Synonyms
- Cephalips Arrow, 1937; Glisrochilus (lapsus); Librodor Reitter, 1884

= Glischrochilus =

Genus of beetles

Glischrochilus (sometimes misspelled as Glisrochilus)^{[note 1]} is a genus of sap-feeding and predatory beetles under the family Nitidulidae, subfamily Cryptarchinae. Most members of this genus are commonly known as picnic beetles or beer bugs.

== Description ==
Glischrochilus are oblong shiny black beetles with attractive yellow, red, or orange markings on their elytra. Their elytra are short and expose the upper surface of their last abdominal segments, a good way to distinguish them from the superficially similar but generally larger Megalodacne beetles. They are so similar that some species of Glischrochilus were once classified along with Megalodacne under the now reclassified genus Ips.

Like other nitulidid beetles, adult Glischrochilus can be distinguished from other kinds of sap-feeding beetles by their characteristic 11-segmented antennae that end with a 3-segmented ball-like club. Glischrochilus are among the largest of the nitulidid beetles, but they are still generally smaller in comparison to other beetles, averaging at only 5 millimetres (0.20 in) in length, with larger specimens at 12 mm (0.47 in) long.

Glischrochilus eggs are sausage-shaped and milky white. Eggs are laid during spring near decaying plant matter. Larvae are about 6.4 mm (0.25 in) long and feed for three weeks on fermenting juices and then pupate. It takes a little over a month for picnic beetles to develop from egg to adult and only one generation is produced each year.

== Ecology ==
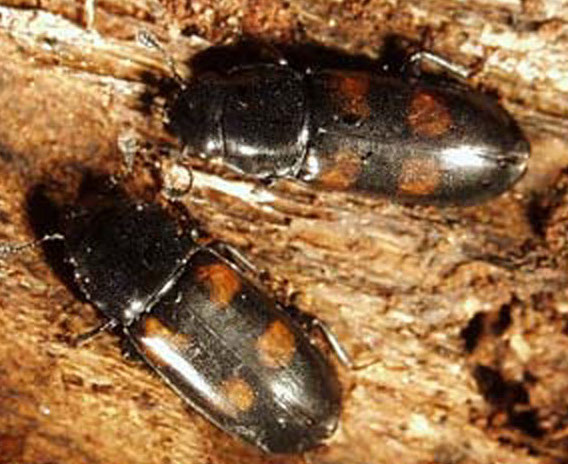
European bark beetle predators, Glischrochilus quadripunctatus, are predators of the larvae of wood-boring insects, particularly bark beetles.

Glischrochilus beetles from the subgenus Librodor, consisting the majority of species in the genus, feed on exuding sap from injured trees and decaying vegetable or fungal matter. They are also attracted to ripening fruits, as well as beer, vinegar, wine, fruit juice and fermenting beverages. They frequently drown as they feed, rendering these liquids unsuitable for consumption. They congregate in large numbers when such beverages are present, often ruining picnics and outdoor gatherings like barbecues, earning them their common names of 'picnic beetles', 'picnic bugs', or 'beer bugs'. Researchers who wish to attract the bugs use bait that contains beer, molasses, vinegar, pineapple and other ingredients.

Glischrochilus beetles from the subgenus Glischrochilus on the other hand are facultative and obligatory predators of soft invertebrates (including insect larvae) living under tree barks.

Species from both subgenera are found in North America and Eurasia.

Glischrochilus are also known to be involved in the transmission of the plant pathogenic fungi Ceratocystis and Fusarium. They are also considered pests of certain fruit and vegetable crops like strawberries, corn, tomatoes, apricot, melons, raspberries, and peaches. They normally only become a problem when fruits are damaged or are overripe and beginning to ferment. They are difficult to control as they are primarily attracted to the odor of food. Methods of control include scent baits and removing damaged or overripe fruits.

== Taxonomy ==
Glischrochilus belongs to the subfamily Cryptarchinae under the tribe Cryptarchini. It contains two subgenera, Glischrochilus and Librodor.

They were first described by the German entomologist Edmund Reitter in 1873. The name Glischrochilus is derived from the Greek words γλισχρό (glischro, sticky) and χείλος (cheílos, lip).

=== Selected species ===
The following list may be incomplete or inaccurate:

- Subgenus Glischrochilus Reitter, 1873
  - Glischrochilus biguttulus (Motschulsky, 1860)
  - Glischrochilus confluentus (Say)
  - Glischrochilus cruciatus (Motschulsky, 1860)
  - Glischrochilus lecontei (Brown, 1931)
  - Glischrochilus moratus (Brown)
  - Glischrochilus obtusus (Say, 1835)
  - Glischrochilus quadripunctatus (Linnaeus, 1758) – European bark beetle predator
  - Glischrochilus vittatus (Say)
- Subgenus Librodor Reitter, 1884 (including Cephalips)
  - Glischrochilus affinis Kirejtshuk, 1984
  - Glischrochilus binaevus (Reitter, 1879)
  - Glischrochilus christophi (Reitter, 1879)
  - Glischrochilus clavatus Reitter, 1884
  - Glischrochilus egregius (Grouvelle, 1892)
  - Glischrochilus fasciatus (Olivier, 1790)
  - Glischrochilus grandis (Tournier, 1872)
  - Glischrochilus hortensis (Fourcroy, 1785)
  - Glischrochilus ipsoides (Reitter, 1879)
  - Glischrochilus japonicus (Motschulsky, 1858)
  - Glischrochilus jelineki Lasoń, 2009
  - Glischrochilus pantherinus (Reitter, 1879)
  - Glischrochilus parvipustulatus (Kolbe, 1886)
  - Glischrochilus quadriguttatus (Fabricius, 1776)
  - Glischrochilus quadrisignatus (Say, 1835) – four-spotted sap beetle
  - Glischrochilus rufiventris (Reitter, 1879)
  - Glischrochilus sanguinolentus (Olivier, 1790)
  - Glischrochilus siepmanni (W. J. Brown)
  - Glischrochilus subcylindricus Reitter, 1884
- Species Glischrochilus becvari Jelinek, 1999
- Species Glischrochilus forcipatus Fairmaire, 1889

== Notes ==
^{1} For example, Finsberg, T. A. C. 2009. Insektsliv och vegetation vid brandfältet på Stora Fjället ett år efter, pp.13
