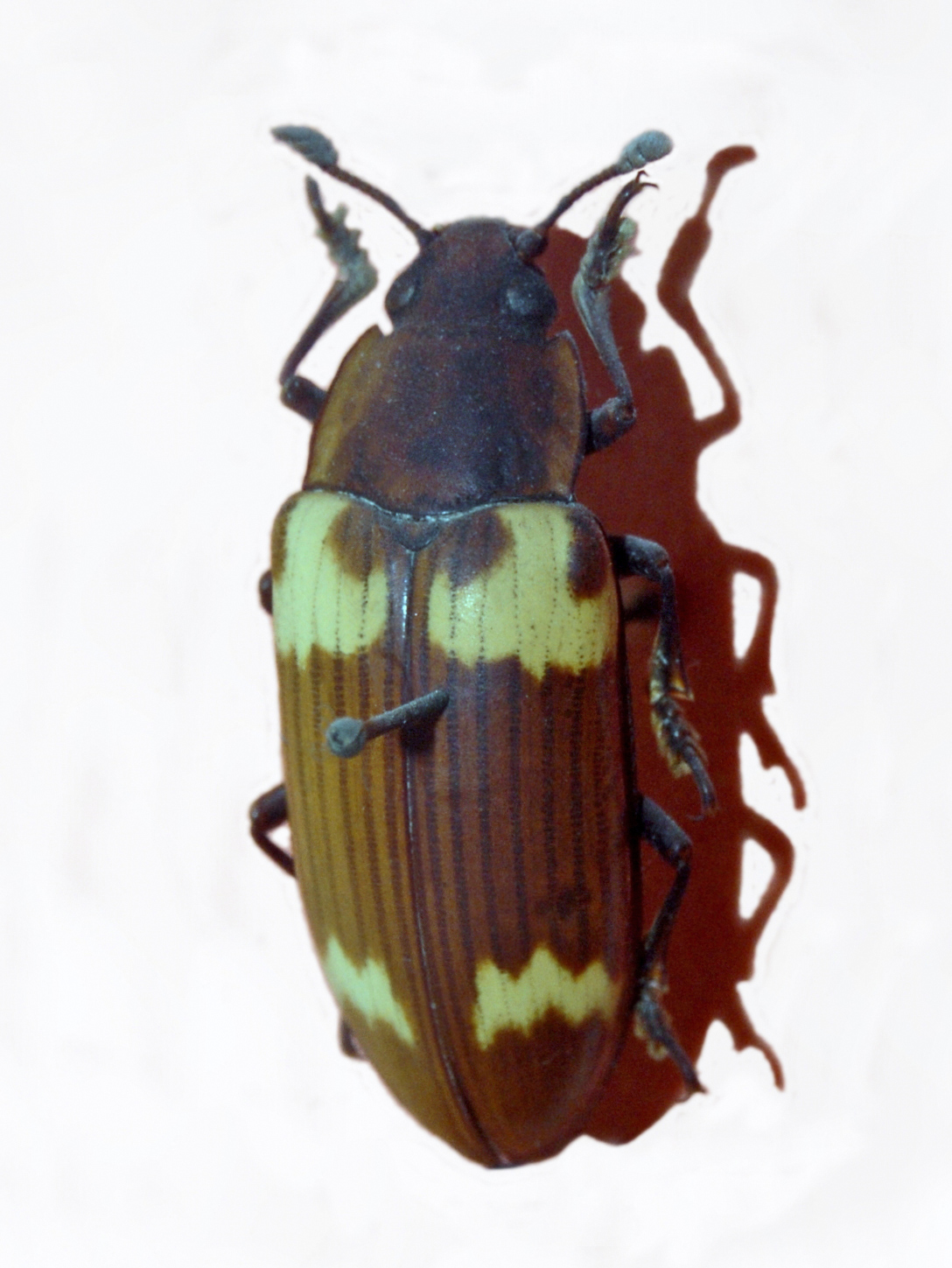
- Mounted specimen

Scientific classification
- Kingdom: Animalia
- Phylum: Arthropoda
- Clade: Pancrustacea
- Class: Insecta
- Order: Coleoptera
- Suborder: Polyphaga
- Infraorder: Cucujiformia
- Family: Erotylidae
- Genus: Mimodacne
- Species: M. rhodesiaca

Binomial name
- Mimodacne rhodesiaca L. Bedel, 1917

Synonyms
- Megalodacne rhodesiaca (Bedel, 1917)

= Mimodacne rhodesiaca =

Species of beetle

Mimodacne rhodesiaca is a species of pleasing fungus beetle in the family Erotylidae.

This species can be found in equatorial Africa and Zimbabwe.

== Description ==
Mimodacne rhodesiaca can reach a length of 17–26 millimetres (0.67–1.02 in). These beetles have black elytra with two transversal yellowish bands. The club of the antenna is very large and markedly asymmetrical.
