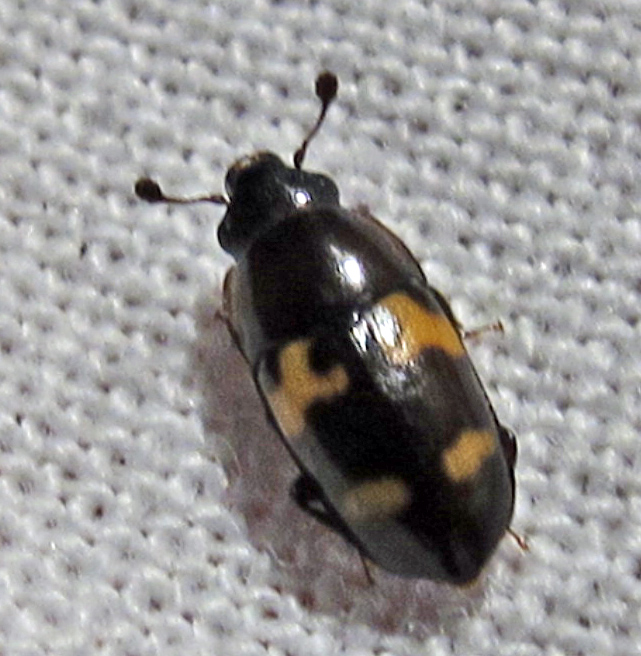

Scientific classification
- Kingdom: Animalia
- Phylum: Arthropoda
- Clade: Pancrustacea
- Class: Insecta
- Order: Coleoptera
- Suborder: Polyphaga
- Infraorder: Cucujiformia
- Family: Nitidulidae
- Genus: Glischrochilus
- Species: G. fasciatus

Binomial name
- Glischrochilus fasciatus (Olivier, 1790)

Synonyms
- Glischrochilus geminatus (Melsheimer, 1846); Glischrochilus quadrimaculosa (Melsheimer, 1846)

= Glischrochilus fasciatus =

Species of beetle

Glischrochilus fasciatus is a species of sap-feeding beetle in the family Nitidulidae. It belongs to the "picnic beetle" genus and is found in Central America and North America.
