= Lobiopa brunnescens =

Scientific classification
- Domain: Eukaryota
- Kingdom: Animalia
- Phylum: Arthropoda
- Class: Insecta
- Order: Coleoptera
- Suborder: Polyphaga
- Infraorder: Cucujiformia
- Family: Nitidulidae
- Tribe: Nitidulini
- Genus: Lobiopa
- Species: L. brunnescens

Binomial name
- Lobiopa brunnescens (Blatchley, 1917)

Synonyms
- Soronia brunnescens Blatchley, 1917

Species of beetle

Lobiopa brunnescens is a species of sap-feeding beetle in the family Nitidulidae. It is found in North America.
