= Nitidula nigra =

Scientific classification
- Domain: Eukaryota
- Kingdom: Animalia
- Phylum: Arthropoda
- Class: Insecta
- Order: Coleoptera
- Suborder: Polyphaga
- Infraorder: Cucujiformia
- Family: Nitidulidae
- Tribe: Nitidulini
- Genus: Nitidula
- Species: N. nigra

Binomial name
- Nitidula nigra Schaeffer, 1911

Species of beetle

Nitidula nigra is a species of sap-feeding beetle in the family Nitidulidae. It is found in North America.
