= Cychramus adustus =

Scientific classification
- Kingdom: Animalia
- Phylum: Arthropoda
- Class: Insecta
- Order: Coleoptera
- Suborder: Polyphaga
- Infraorder: Cucujiformia
- Family: Nitidulidae
- Subfamily: Nitidulinae
- Genus: Cychramus
- Species: C. adustus

Binomial name
- Cychramus adustus Erichson, 1843

Synonyms
- Cychramus bicolor Horn, 1879

Species of beetle

Cychramus adustus is a species of sap-feeding beetle in the family Nitidulidae. It is found in North America.

== Subspecies ==
These two subspecies belong to the species Cychramus adustus:

- Cychramus adustus adustus
- Cychramus adustus bicolor Horn, 1879
