= Camptodes texanus =

Scientific classification
- Domain: Eukaryota
- Kingdom: Animalia
- Phylum: Arthropoda
- Class: Insecta
- Order: Coleoptera
- Suborder: Polyphaga
- Infraorder: Cucujiformia
- Family: Nitidulidae
- Subfamily: Nitidulinae
- Genus: Camptodes
- Species: C. texanus

Binomial name
- Camptodes texanus Schaeffer, 1904

Species of beetle

Camptodes texanus is a species of sap-feeding beetle in the family Nitidulidae. It is found in North America.
