= Strongylus =

Strongylus may refer to:

- Strongylus (nematode), a genus of nematodes in the family Strongylidae
- Strongylus Herbst, 1792, a genus of beetles in the family Nitidulidae, synonym of Cyllodes
- Strongylus Panzer, 1813, a genus of beetles in the family Coccinellidae, synonym of Coccidula
- Strongylus Mannerheim, 1846, a genus of beetles in the family Lampyridae, synonym of Pyrocoelia
