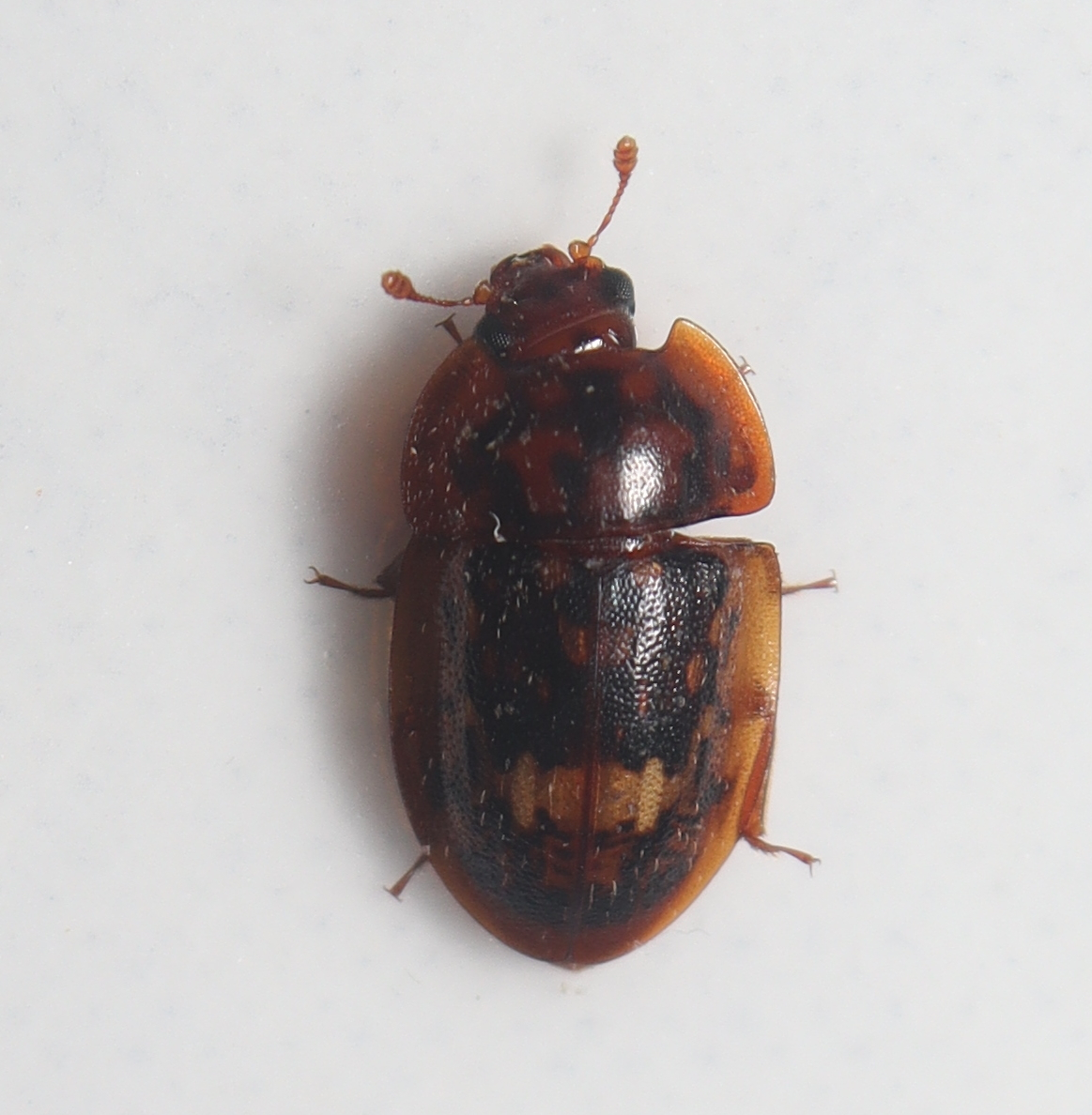

Scientific classification
- Kingdom: Animalia
- Phylum: Arthropoda
- Class: Insecta
- Order: Coleoptera
- Suborder: Polyphaga
- Infraorder: Cucujiformia
- Family: Nitidulidae
- Tribe: Nitidulini
- Genus: Lobiopa
- Species: L. insularis

Binomial name
- Lobiopa insularis (Laporte, 1840)

Synonyms
- Lobiopa contaminata Erichson, 1843; Lobiopa decumana (Erichson, 1843); Lobiopa dimidiata Erichson, 1843; Lobiopa grandis Erichson, 1843

= Lobiopa insularis =

Species of beetle

Lobiopa insularis is a species of sap-feeding beetle in the family Nitidulidae. It is found in the Caribbean Sea, Central America, North America, and South America.
