= Pocadius fulvipennis =

Scientific classification
- Kingdom: Animalia
- Phylum: Arthropoda
- Class: Insecta
- Order: Coleoptera
- Suborder: Polyphaga
- Infraorder: Cucujiformia
- Family: Nitidulidae
- Tribe: Nitidulini
- Genus: Pocadius
- Species: P. fulvipennis

Binomial name
- Pocadius fulvipennis Erichson, 1843

Synonyms
- Pocadius dorsalis Horn, 1879

Species of beetle

Pocadius fulvipennis is a species of sap-feeding beetle in the family Nitidulidae. It is found in Central America and North America.
