= Lobiopa falli =

Scientific classification
- Domain: Eukaryota
- Kingdom: Animalia
- Phylum: Arthropoda
- Class: Insecta
- Order: Coleoptera
- Suborder: Polyphaga
- Infraorder: Cucujiformia
- Family: Nitidulidae
- Tribe: Nitidulini
- Genus: Lobiopa
- Species: L. falli

Binomial name
- Lobiopa falli Parsons, 1938

Species of beetle

Lobiopa falli is a species of sap-feeding beetle in the family Nitidulidae. It is found in North America.
