= Pallodes plateosus =

Scientific classification
- Domain: Eukaryota
- Kingdom: Animalia
- Phylum: Arthropoda
- Class: Insecta
- Order: Coleoptera
- Suborder: Polyphaga
- Infraorder: Cucujiformia
- Family: Nitidulidae
- Subfamily: Nitidulinae
- Genus: Pallodes
- Species: P. plateosus

Binomial name
- Pallodes plateosus Schaeffer, 1931

Species of beetle

Pallodes plateosus is a species of sap-feeding beetle in the family Nitidulidae. It is found in North America.
