= Pocadius helvolus =

Scientific classification
- Kingdom: Animalia
- Phylum: Arthropoda
- Class: Insecta
- Order: Coleoptera
- Suborder: Polyphaga
- Infraorder: Cucujiformia
- Family: Nitidulidae
- Tribe: Nitidulini
- Genus: Pocadius
- Species: P. helvolus

Binomial name
- Pocadius helvolus Erichson, 1843

Synonyms
- Pocadius breviusculus Reitter, 1876; Pocadius infuscatus Reitter, 1873; Pocadius limbatus Reitter, 1873

Species of beetle

Pocadius helvolus, the hairy puffball beetle, is a species of sap-feeding beetle in the family Nitidulidae. It is found in Central America and North America.
