= Nitidula flavomaculata =

Scientific classification
- Kingdom: Animalia
- Phylum: Arthropoda
- Class: Insecta
- Order: Coleoptera
- Suborder: Polyphaga
- Infraorder: Cucujiformia
- Family: Nitidulidae
- Tribe: Nitidulini
- Genus: Nitidula
- Species: N. flavomaculata

Binomial name
- Nitidula flavomaculata Rossi, 1790

Synonyms
- Nitidula flexuosa Olivier, 1790

Species of beetle

Nitidula flavomaculata is a species of sap-feeding beetle in the family Nitidulidae. It is native to the Mediterranean Region and naturalized in North America. It is associated with later stages of decay in mammalian corpses. It can be used in forensic investigations.
