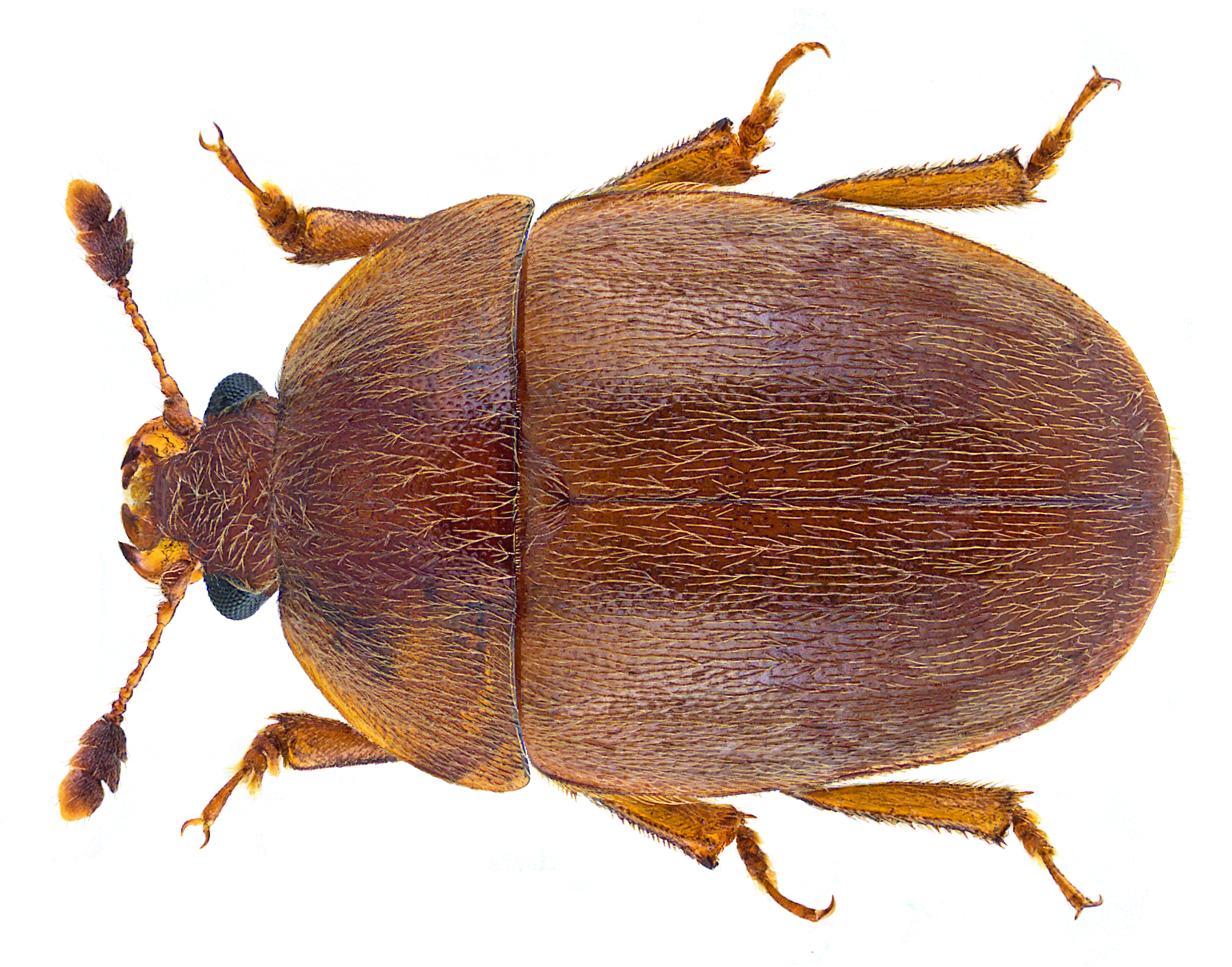
- Cychramus luteus

Scientific classification
- Domain: Eukaryota
- Kingdom: Animalia
- Phylum: Arthropoda
- Class: Insecta
- Order: Coleoptera
- Suborder: Polyphaga
- Infraorder: Cucujiformia
- Family: Nitidulidae
- Subfamily: Nitidulinae
- Genus: Cychramus; Kugelann, 1794

= Cychramus =

Genus of beetles

Cychramus is a genus of sap-feeding beetles in the family Nitidulidae. There are about six described species in Cychramus.

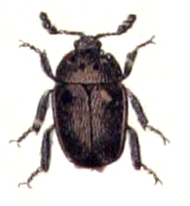
Cychramus variegatus

== Species ==
These six species belong to the genus Cychramus:

- Cychramus adustus Erichson, 1843
- Cychramus castaneus (Blatchley, 1916)
- Cychramus luteus (Fabricius, 1787)
- Cychramus variegatoideus Hisamatsu, 2008
- Cychramus variegatus (Herbst, 1792)
- Cychramus zimmermanni Horn, 1879
