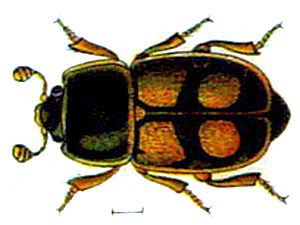

Scientific classification
- Kingdom: Animalia
- Phylum: Arthropoda
- Clade: Pancrustacea
- Class: Insecta
- Order: Coleoptera
- Suborder: Polyphaga
- Infraorder: Cucujiformia
- Family: Nitidulidae
- Genus: Nitidula
- Species: N. carnaria

Binomial name
- Nitidula carnaria (Schaller, 1783)

= Nitidula carnaria =

Species of beetle

Nitidula carnaria is a species of sap beetle in the Nitidulidae family.
