= Pallodes austrinus =

Scientific classification
- Kingdom: Animalia
- Phylum: Arthropoda
- Class: Insecta
- Order: Coleoptera
- Suborder: Polyphaga
- Infraorder: Cucujiformia
- Family: Nitidulidae
- Genus: Pallodes
- Species: P. austrinus

Binomial name
- Pallodes austrinus Leschen, 1988

Species of beetle

Pallodes austrinus is a species of sap-feeding beetle in the family Nitidulidae. It is found in North America. It was described in 1988 by Richard A.B. Leschen.

Adults measure 3–4 mm (0.12–0.16 in) in length. The type series was collected from various mushrooms, including species of Lactarius, Russula, Amanita, and Boletus.
