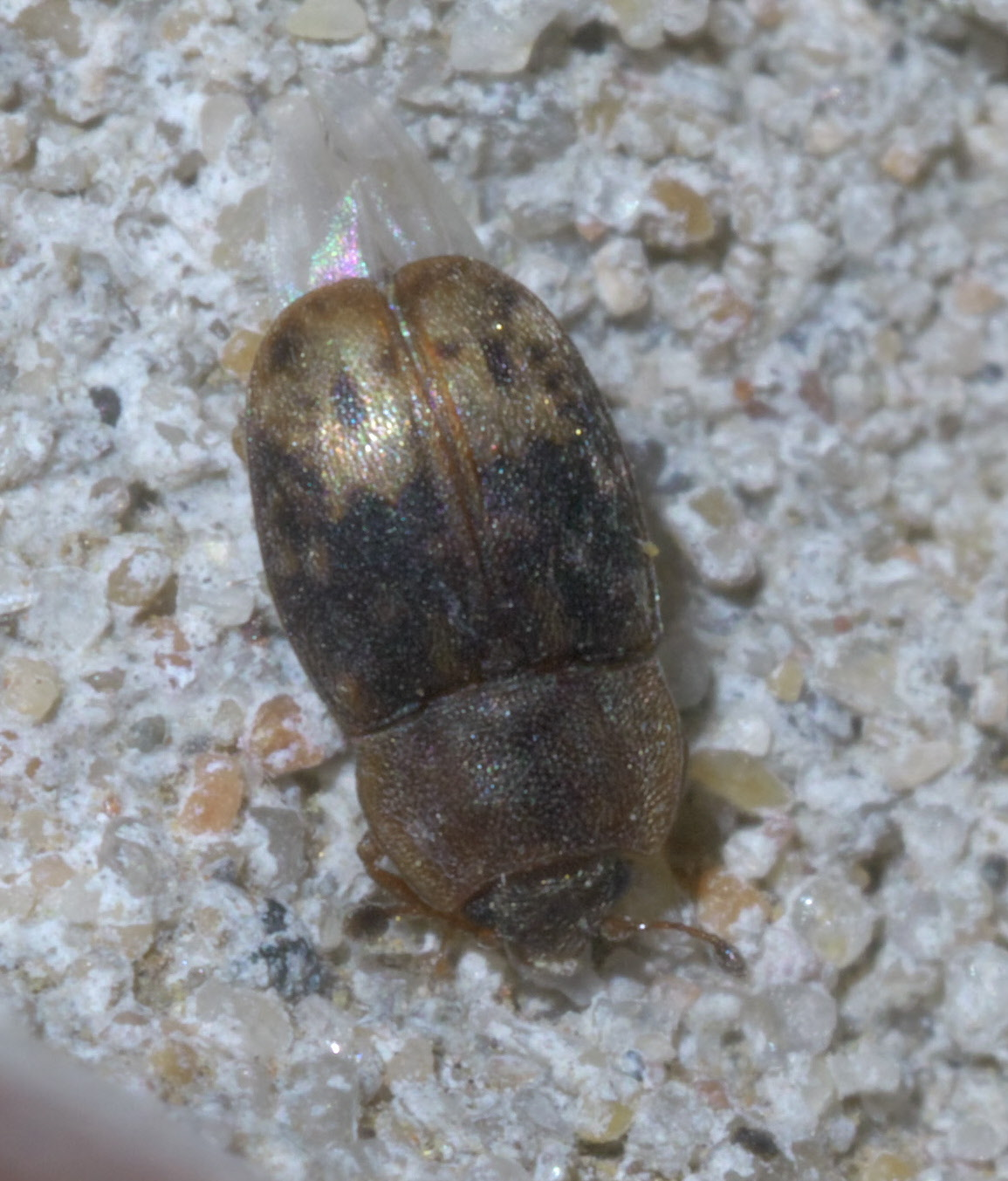

Scientific classification
- Domain: Eukaryota
- Kingdom: Animalia
- Phylum: Arthropoda
- Class: Insecta
- Order: Coleoptera
- Suborder: Polyphaga
- Infraorder: Cucujiformia
- Family: Nitidulidae
- Genus: Omosita
- Species: O. nearctica

Binomial name
- Omosita nearctica Kirejtshuk, 1987

= Omosita nearctica =

Species of beetle

Omosita nearctica is a species of sap-feeding beetle in the family Nitidulidae.

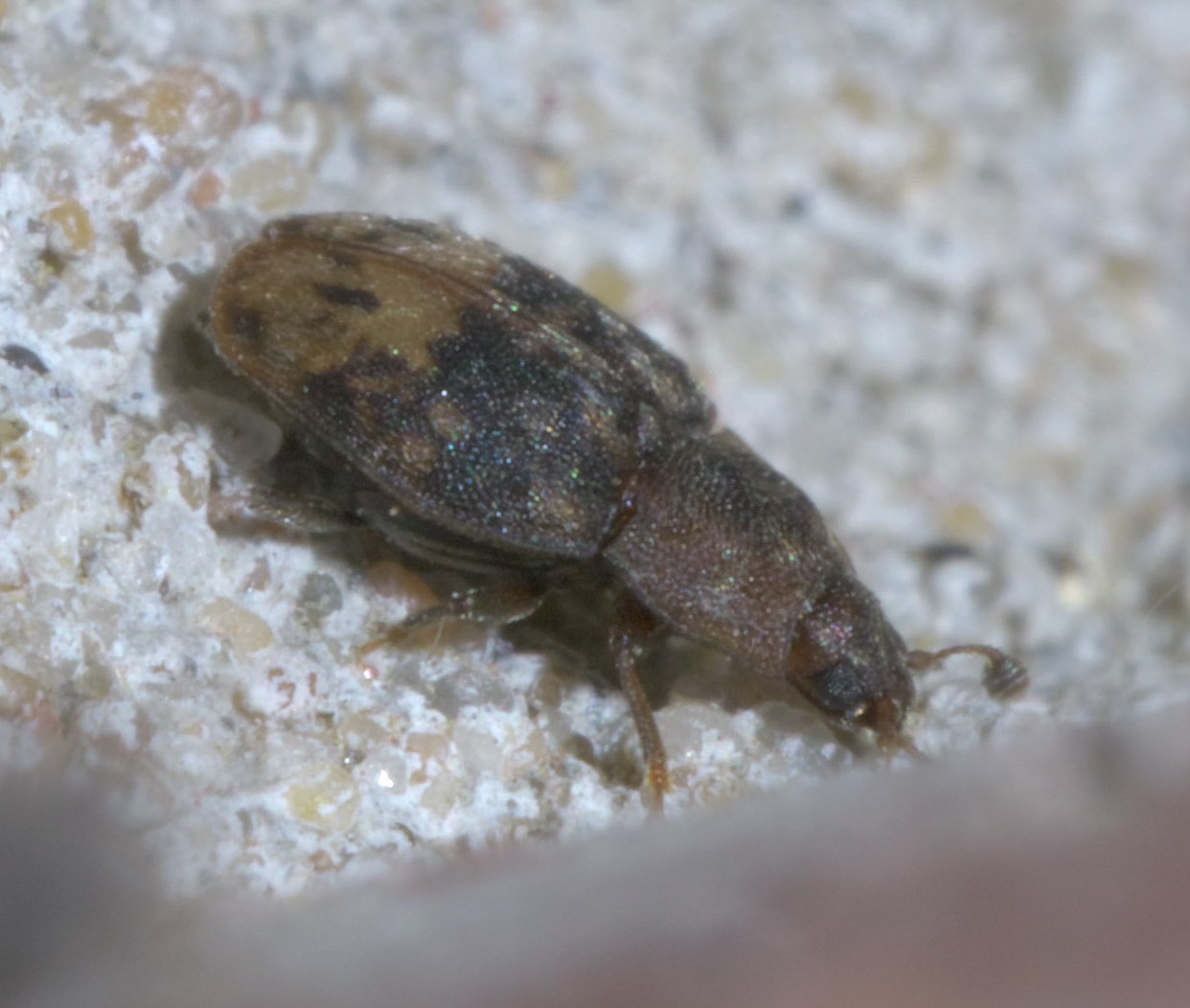
