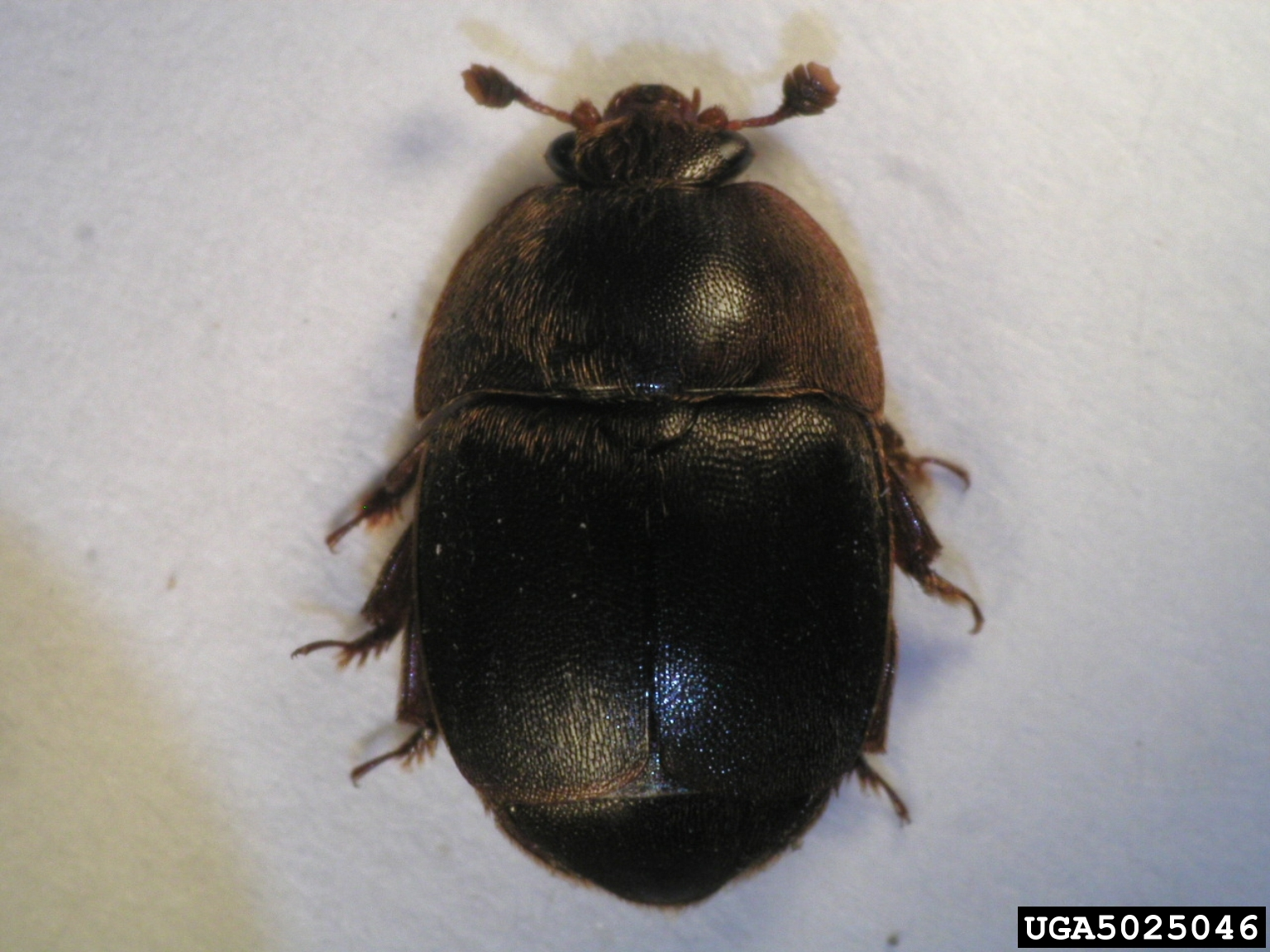

Scientific classification
- Kingdom: Animalia
- Phylum: Arthropoda
- Clade: Pancrustacea
- Class: Insecta
- Order: Coleoptera
- Suborder: Polyphaga
- Infraorder: Cucujiformia
- Family: Nitidulidae
- Genus: Aethina
- Species: A. tumida

Binomial name
- Aethina tumida Murray, 1867

= Small hive beetle =

Species of beetle

Aethina tumida, commonly known as the small hive beetle (SHB), is a beekeeping pest. It is native to sub-Saharan Africa, but has spread to many other regions, including North America, Australia, and the Philippines.

The small hive beetle primarily lives within the beehive and feeds on pollen, honey, and dead bees. The colonization can cause severe damage to honeycomb, stored honey, and pollen. Beetle larvae may tunnel through combs of honey, feeding and defecating, causing discoloration and fermentation of the honey. If a beetle infestation is abundant and concentrated, they may cause bees to abandon their hive.

Small hive beetles have shown unique behavior associated with pheromones. They can sense the honeybee's alarm pheromone, which is primarily released by the host to inform the host guards about the presence of invaders. This fitness advantage improves their ability to quickly locate and colonize the honeybee hives. The host has evolved some strategies to cope with the colony damage, such as imprisonment of the invader, patrolling, and removal of beetle's eggs.

Small hive beetles can cause significant economic loss on bee colony, stored honey, and package bee production. Biological control method includes uses of fungi and fire ants. Cultural control focuses on the hygienic practice of beekeeper. Chemical control strategy includes uses of carbon disulfide, para-dichlorobenzene, and some chemical products on the market.

== Distribution ==
The small hive beetle was first discovered in the United States in 1996 and has now spread to 27 U.S. states, including Hawaii.

An infestation by the small hive beetle was triggered in 2015 in British Columbia which led to a temporary quarantine.

In Mexico, the small hive beetle has become established in at least eight states. Infestation levels are especially high in tropical areas such as the Yucatán.

The small hive beetle was first detected in Belize in 2016 in the Corozal District and was reported in Honduras in 2024

The small hive beetle has also spread to Australia in areas of Richmond, New South Wales, Queensland, and New South Wales. It is not found in Northern Territory and is no longer been a notifiable pest in Victoria and South Australia. In Western Australia, it is restricted to the Kimberly region. It is possible that the import of package bees, honeybee or bumblebee colonies, queens, hive equipment, or even soil constituted the potential invasion pathway of the small hive beetle; however, at the current state of evidence it is still unclear how small hive beetles actually reached Australia.

The small hive beetle has now reached southern Mindanao in the Philippines. It might lead to a spread through the country if hives and bees are moved to other areas.

Small hive beetle was first detected in Calabria, southern Italy in September 2014. It is currently confined to the provinces of Reggio Calabria and part of Vibo Valentia, where it has now become naturalized. In 2014 and 2019, outbreaks of infestation occurred in eastern Sicily.

== Habitat ==
Females lay eggs within the bee brood and larvae would hatch inside. Pupation happens under the soil. The adults primarily live within the host hive and seek for food from the hosts. Adults can overwinter with the bee population in colder climates.

== Food resources ==
Small hive beetles are insectivores, and they can be fed on both animal and plant diets. Animal diets include the bee eggs, host body fluids, and dead bees. Plant diets include fruit, nectar, and pollen. Adults and larvae are fed by the same food.

== Description ==
Small hive beetles are categorized as small insects with length around 5-7mm and width around 2.5-3.5mm. Sexual dimorphism is observed since females are usually longer and heavier than male. The size of the beetles may vary based on environmental factors such as diet, temperature, and humidity. For their body structure, there are three pairs of walking legs, two antennae, and two pairs of wings. Their body is bilaterally symmetrical. They have a wide range of body coloration, from orange-brown to dark brown or black. This species is ectothermic, which means they rely on external heat sources to adjust body temperature.

Younger small hive beetles have a very distinguishable appearance than adults. The beetle eggs are elongated with a white color. The beetle larvae have reduced white color with a segmented body shape. They have three pairs of legs behind the head. When the exoskeleton develops, the pupae turn to brown color which looks more similar to adults.

== Parental care ==
=== Oviposition ===
Small hive beetles reproduce sexually up to 5 generations each year and they are polygynandrous, meaning that both males and females mate with multiple partners. The eggs are fertilized externally and are laid in clusters. Females can oviposit at least 1000 and up to 2000 eggs in her entire life. Females prefer to lay eggs directly onto their food sources and can also lay eggs in crevices within the beehive to improve the offspring survival rate via granted food resources. It was found that female can lay eggs on bee pupae when the colony is mainly occupied by the beetle. During the winter time, the beetles prefer strong hives for more resources to keep their body temperature. On the contrary, they prefer weaker hives to invade and reproduce during the summertime.

== Social behavior ==
=== Reproduction seasonality ===
The peak of reproduction period varies in different places. Most small hive beetle populations reach the highest density during the summer and early autumn season with high temperature. Some populations show preference for the rainy season while others prefer the dry season.

=== Function of pheromones ===
Pheromones are chemical substances that are released by organisms to impact the behavior of other members within the species. They are very important for group behavior and communication.

SHB is a parasite and scavenger of bee colonies, especially for honeybee colonies, Apis mellifera. The honeybee’s alarm pheromone, especially of European honeybee (EHB), plays a significant role in colony defense against predators and parasites by recruiting more guard bees and triggering the attack on invaders. However, it is shown that the volatiles of pheromone are attractive to SHBs. Therefore, there is a trade-off between recruiting more bees to defend the hive and to attract more attack from additional beetles.

It has been proved that the antennae of SHBs has a lower threshold to sense the component of the volatiles released from the hive entrance compared to the honeybee. They can also sense more types of chemicals than the host workers and foragers. This ability highly improves the beetle’s fitness to recognize and invade the colony quickly since the bees are not able to sense and initiate attack at the invader under low pheromone concentration.

=== The mutualistic relationship between yeast and SHB ===
It was found that yeast associated with the SHB can release alarm pheromones, which has the same attractive effects as the pheromone produced by EHB. Therefore, yeast can facilitate the beetle’s invasion into the beehive if the yeast is contained as a food source within the bee hive. For example, the bee might collect yeast-inoculated pollen and store the pollen inside the hive. The bees themselves might also help attract the beetle if they get into contact with the yeast pores released by nitidulids. The volatiles released by bees and the yeast together suggest the availability of the food and attract more beetles, which might lead to the absconding or the complete collapse of the hive.

=== Small hive beetles aggregation pheromone ===
Small hive beetles use pheromone-mediated aggregations to counteract the host defense response. It is suggested that the aggregation pheromone is released by males because males infest before females. The pheromone can signal both males and females.

== Life history ==
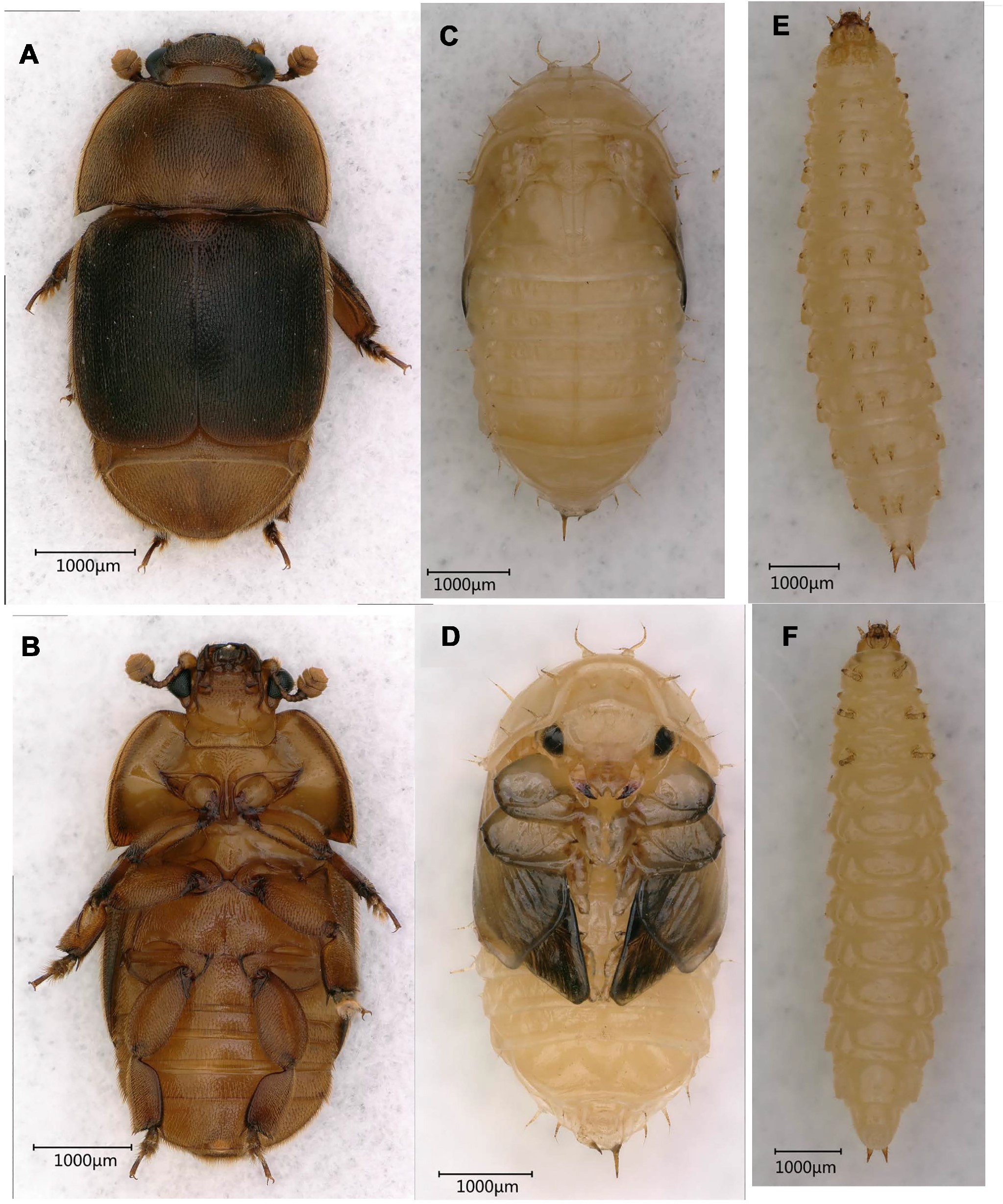
Life stages of small hive beetles

Small hive beetles grow and develop via metamorphosis. The organism undergoes 4 stages of egg, larvae, pupae, and adult.

=== Egg ===
Females lay eggs either in the gaps within the host hive or directly on the fruits or meat. Eggs have a pearly white appearance. They are about 1.4mm long and 2.6mm wide. The eggs hatch about 1–6 days, but the time highly depends on the environmental humidity.

=== Larvae ===
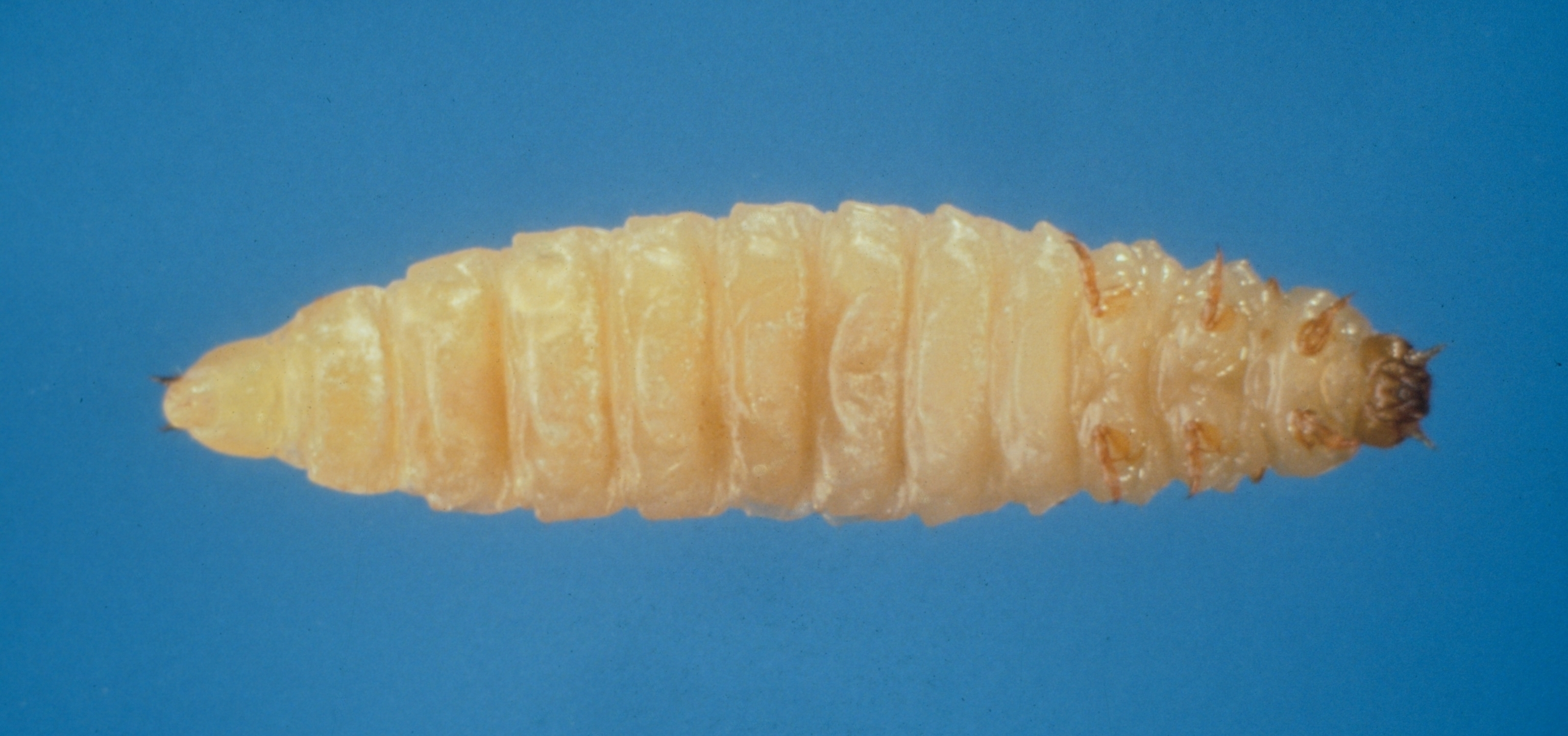
Larva

Larvae are about 1 cm long upon complete development, with a white color. Their body is segmented with 3 pairs of legs in front of the head. This stage continues about 13.3 days within the host hive and about 3 more days in the soil to prepare for the pupation. This stage creates the most severe damage toward the host hive as fermentation occurs when the larvae tunnel through the hive.

=== Pupae ===
Beetles create a chamber beneath the soil for the pupation. The period varies greatly with soil humidity and density with an average of 10 days and can be up to 100 days. They turn from white to brown color upon maturity.

=== Adult ===
Adult beetles are about 5-7mm long and 3-4.5mm wide. Their lifespan highly depends on the food sources. They may live for 6 months when fed by honey, but can only live for 19 days when fed by water and beeswax. They can live for about 10 days without any food or water intake, which gives them a period to look for a new host when they first emerge from the soil.

== Parasitism ==
=== Host response and SHBs' counter-strategy ===
In response to the beetle’s invasion, the honeybee has developed some adaptive strategies. Upon entrance, the guard bees would attach the invaders and minimizing the entrance size using propolis. If the beetles enter the hive, the guards would catch them and keep them in the propolis confinement sites. The confinement limits the beetle mating inside the hive. The imprisonment strategy might be undermined by the beekeeper's activity. The opening and human manipulation of the colony may release the captured beetles which increase the damage to the bee hive.

Patrolling behavior around the nest and combs is well observed in the brood area within the hive. The presence of bees within the colony can limit the number of beetles entering the hive, which is proposed to be due to the protective effects to the colony via the patrolling behavior of the host workers. The presence of bees within the colony can impact the number of beetles' presence where more bees can limit the existence of beetles.

The third strategy is to remove beetle eggs and larvae. SHB can hide from the patrolling behavior by ovipositing in the combs. To deal with this counter strategy, honeybee workers developed the adaptation to remove the beetle’s eggs and larvae. However, SHBs can still lay clutch of eggs in the crevices to escape from the host’s defense response. Once SHBs get to this invasion stage, they can start the mass reproduction which leads to a completely structural collapse of the entire beehive. Honeybees can either physically prevent beetles to lay clusters of eggs or to detect and remove eggs once laid. The strategy of “social encapsulation” is used to confine the beetles via propolis, which prisons the beetle and limit their activity.

=== Host feeding behavior towards the beetle ===
The captured beetles have been observed to live up to 2 months without the ability to find food within the hive and their reserved food can only support them to live for 2 weeks. The observed behavior of bees feeding the beetle might be the result of behavioral mimicry. The beetle constantly taps the bees with their antennae. This behavior mimics the action of other bees and traps the host to feed the beetle.

=== Host colony mobility ===
Under severe infestation situation, the host honeybee colonies might show an absconding and migration strategy where they would give up their nest and leave the left resources to the beetles. This strategy is usually followed by colony merging.

=== Vector to the host ===
In a controlled laboratory setting, small hive beetles help spread Paenibacillus larvae, which is a bacteria causing the American foulbrood. The infective P. larvae spores are transmitted to the honeybee as well as the honey if the host gets into contact with the infected small hive beetles. Small hive beetle is also a vector for honeybee viruses, including deformed wing virus and sacbrood virus. They can bring the viruses to the honeybee host and cause widespread infection.

== Migration ==
=== Natural range expansion ===
Adult SHBs have strong flying ability up to 16 kilometers. Adult beetles emerged immediately from pupation were found not to invade the honeybee hives that are close to their pupation location and they prefer the long distance flights.

=== Human-associated dispersal ===
Human activity such as migratory beekeeping and movement of package bees and beekeeping equipment significantly facilitates the quick spread of small hive beetles around the world. It only took two years for the small hive beetles to move across the US.

== Enemies ==
=== Predators ===
Entomopathogenic fungi can function as a strong biopesticide for small hive beetles, such as Metarhizium and Beauveria. The ant Pheidole megacephala is the predator specifically to small hive beetle larvae in Kenya.

=== Competitor ===
There is no direct competitor with small hive beetles within honeybee colonies. Competition may appear when other organisms occasionally share the food left within the honeybee colonies and other resources with small hive beetles.

== Genetics ==
Two distinct mitochondrial DNA (mtDNA) haplotypes were found in the US collection and 13 haplotypes were found in the South Africa collection. Previous research has shown the mtDNA data indicated that both continents have the same beetle species. There is little evidence indicating if the beetle in US originates from Africa.

Two haplotypes found in US are proved to show different frequency in different areas, which might be the result of more than two separate introduction of the species into US, possible selection in different regions or the genetic bottleneck when beetle colonizers new sites. There is no selection pressure found between two haplotypes.

== Mating ==
=== Aggregation and copulation behavior ===
Copulation starts one week after the adults emerge from the soil and reaches the highest frequency after 18 days. Mating is much more common if beetles are aggregated than if they are in single pairs.

=== Gender preference ===
Small hive beetles demonstrate an age-dependent gender preference during copulation. Within the window of 18 days after adults emerge, the male beetles show mating behavior with other males. After 18 days, both genders spend more time to interact and copulate with the opposite sex.

=== Male-male interaction ===
The male beetles might interrupt the copulation process of other males. During the interruption, the males fight over each other using their tarsae, antennae, and mandibles.

=== Female-female interaction ===
The interruption caused by beetle’s pushing behavior during mating process is not only done by males. Instead, a majority of pushing behavior is demonstrated by females towards other members of the same sex during copulation.

=== Female-male interaction ===
The first step for a male to approach a female is via thrilling and tapping the female to climb onto its body. Most of the time, the male eventually ceases his action and either demonstrates non-social behavior or leaves the female. If the male chooses to stay, he will thrill female’s pronotum, slide from female’s body and start copulation by inserting its aedeagus. The female can choose either to stay or to escape. If the female stays during the copulation, the male clings onto the female with its legs while rubbing its partner's elytrae. Mostly, males can keep his position with the females during the interruption, but not during the escape. The male then continues to sit on the female’s back and repeats the entire copulation process. The complete mating behavior finishes when the male descends from the female and demonstrates non-social behavior.

== Damage to colonies and stored honey ==
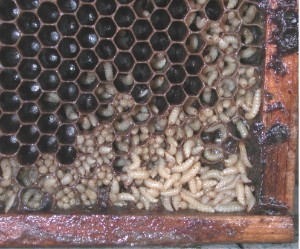
Comb slimed by hive beetle larvae. Hives infested at this level will drive out bee colonies.

The primary damage to colonies and stored honey caused by the small hive beetle is through the feeding activity of the larvae. Larvae tunnel through comb with stored honey or pollen, damaging or destroying cappings and comb. Larvae defecate in honey, which discolors the honey. Activity of the larvae causes fermentation and a frothiness in the honey; the honey develops a characteristic odor of decaying oranges. Damage and fermentation cause honey to run out of combs, creating a mess in hives or extracting rooms. Heavy infestations cause bees to abscond; some beekeepers have reported the rapid collapse of even strong colonies.

== Economic importance ==
SHB are only reported to cause damage on weakened bee colonies in Africa. However, it has caused severe infestations within the USA even on the robust host colony. Most losses are due to damage to the bee colony and stored honey in the honey house. The heavy infestation also negatively affects the queen and package bee production around the world. Prevention strategy has been implemented in UK to eliminate potential spread of SHB as multiple areas have the preferred condition for SHB survival.

== Control ==
=== Biological control ===
Fungal pathogens have shown to kill SHB in laboratory trials. Metarhizium fungi was found to kill the larvae when it is added to soil containing the beetle. It was also found that the fungi could negatively impact the fertility of the beetles. The soil dwelling fungi, A. flavus and A. niger, are found from the dead SHB larvae, which are proved to attack other soil infesting insects.

Soil-infesting nematodes, parasitic wasps, and ants can play a role in SHB control. The imported fire ant, Solenopsis invicta, is found to feed on SHB larvae.

=== Cultural control ===
The beekeeper should keep the honeybee hive well-populated and avoid over stress, which can maintain a productive colony and eliminate the beetle from the colony. The removal and freezing of dead or weakened bee colonies is highly recommended. Beekeepers should be cautious about the application of sugar patty to bee colonies as sugar patty serves as a food source for SHB as well.

=== Chemical control ===
Carbon disulfide and para-dichlorobenzene can be used as fumigants to control SHB within the stored comb.

The chemical product composed of 40% permethrin from Gard Star has been used in the USA. It is mixed with water and applied to the soil which can kill SHB larvae and pupae underneath the ground. It is also used in areas where the infested colony is removed and the beetles are left.

The 10% coumaphos plastic strip by Bayer Corp. is also widely used in USA. It traps the beetles within the box which contains the chemical and then the beetle would die upon lethal dose inhalation.

There are also several traps currently on the market. The more effective ones are the Beetlejail Baitable, Hood Trap, the Freeman Beetle Trap, the West trap, the Australian, AJ's Beetle Eater, and the Beetle Blaster. All these traps use non-toxic oil to suffocate the beetles. This allows beekeepers to avoid having toxic chemicals in their beehives.

== Sources ==
- The Small Hive Beetle Department of Entomology, Virginia Tech, June 1999, accessed Sep 2005
- The Small Hive Beetle: A serious threat to European apiculture The Food and Environment Research Agency, UK Nov 2010, accessed Dec 2011
- Somerville, Doug Study of the small hive beetle in the USA Rural Industries Research and Development Corporation, Jun 2003, accessed Dec 2011
- Ellis J, Ellis A,. (2010). Small hive beetle, Aethina tumida (Murray). Featured Creatures. 6 July 2010.
- Rhodes, John; Livestock Officer, Tamworth Small hive beetle - an in-hive control device using diatomaceous earth (2008)
- Annand, Nicholas Small hive beetle management options NSW DPI Australia, March 2008, accessed Dec 2011
- HawaiiNewsNow Bee parasite the latest threat to Hawaiis honey industry May 5, 2010
