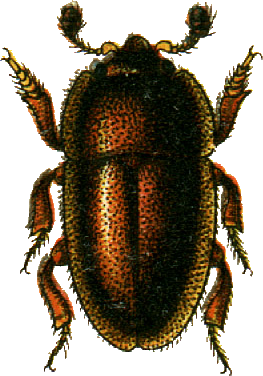
- Thalycra fervida

Scientific classification
- Kingdom: Animalia
- Phylum: Arthropoda
- Class: Insecta
- Order: Coleoptera
- Suborder: Polyphaga
- Infraorder: Cucujiformia
- Family: Nitidulidae
- Subfamily: Nitidulinae
- Tribe: Nitidulini
- Genus: Thalycra; Erichson, 1843

Synonyms
- Pseudothalycra Howden, 1961

= Thalycra =

Genus of beetles

Thalycra is a genus of sap-feeding beetles in the family Nitidulidae. There are at least 20 described species in Thalycra.

== Species ==
These 20 species belong to the genus Thalycra:

- Thalycra acuta Howden, 1961
- Thalycra andrewsi Cline, 2007
- Thalycra carolina (Wickham, 1920)
- Thalycra concolor (LeConte, 1850)
- Thalycra dentata Howden, 1961
- Thalycra emmanueli Auroux, 1967
- Thalycra fervida (Olivier, 1790)
- Thalycra intermedia Howden, 1961
- Thalycra keltoni Howden, 1961
- Thalycra knulli (Howden, 1961)
- Thalycra leechi Howden, 1961
- Thalycra mexicana Howden, 1961
- Thalycra mixta Howden, 1961
- Thalycra monticola Howden, 1961
- Thalycra murrayi (Horn, 1879)
- Thalycra orientalis Howden, 1961
- Thalycra parsonsi Howden, 1961
- Thalycra sinuata Howden, 1961
- Thalycra truncata Howden, 1961
- Thalycra wittmeri Jelínek, 1982
