= Pallodes =

Scientific classification
- Kingdom: Animalia
- Phylum: Arthropoda
- Class: Insecta
- Order: Coleoptera
- Suborder: Polyphaga
- Infraorder: Cucujiformia
- Family: Nitidulidae
- Subfamily: Nitidulinae
- Genus: Pallodes; Erichson, 1843

Genus of beetles

Pallodes is a genus of sap-feeding beetles in the family Nitidulidae. The genus is diverse in the tropics but also includes three North American species. They are common on fresh mushrooms.

== Species ==
As of 2019, there were about 51 recognized species, but it was acknowledged that the genus was in need of a worldwide revision. Pallodes includes the following three North American species:

- Pallodes austrinus Leschen, 1988
- Pallodes pallidus (Beauvois, 1805)
- Pallodes plateosus Schaeffer, 1931
