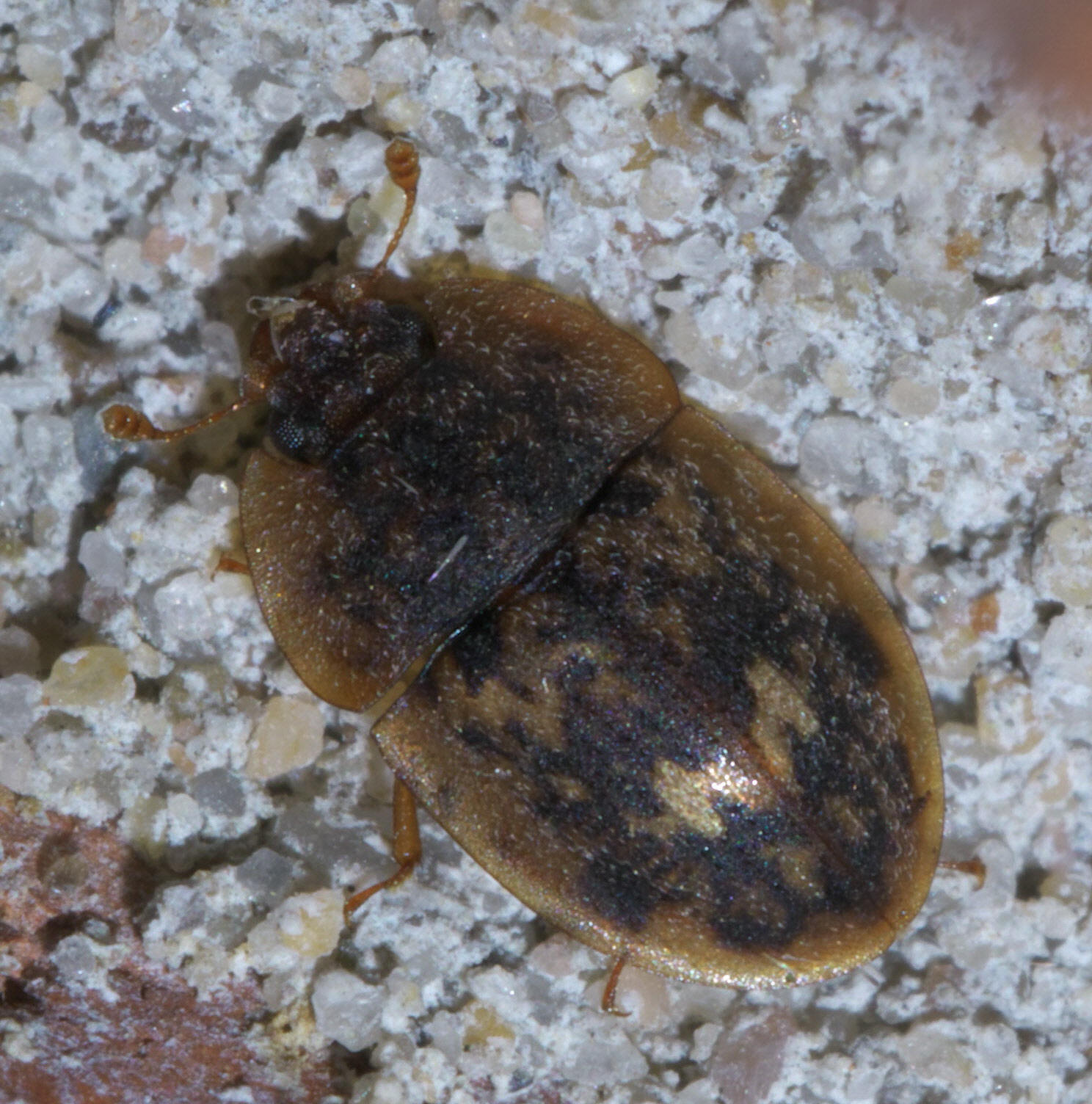
- Lobiopa undulata

Scientific classification
- Kingdom: Animalia
- Phylum: Arthropoda
- Class: Insecta
- Order: Coleoptera
- Suborder: Polyphaga
- Infraorder: Cucujiformia
- Family: Nitidulidae
- Subfamily: Nitidulinae
- Tribe: Nitidulini
- Genus: Lobiopa; Erichson, 1843

= Lobiopa =

Genus of beetles

Lobiopa is a genus of sap-feeding beetles in the family Nitidulidae. There are about seven described species in Lobiopa.

== Species ==
These seven species belong to the genus Lobiopa:

- Lobiopa brunnescens (Blatchley, 1917)
- Lobiopa falli Parsons, 1938
- Lobiopa insularis (Laporte, 1840)
- Lobiopa oblonga Parsons, 1938
- Lobiopa punctata Parsons, 1938
- Lobiopa setosa Harold, 1868
- Lobiopa undulata (Say, 1825)
