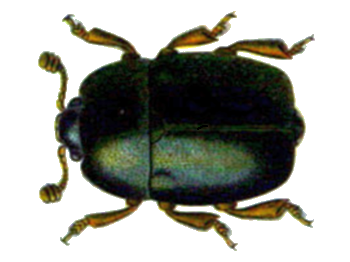

Scientific classification
- Kingdom: Animalia
- Phylum: Arthropoda
- Class: Insecta
- Order: Coleoptera
- Suborder: Polyphaga
- Infraorder: Cucujiformia
- Family: Nitidulidae
- Genus: Nitidula
- Species: N. rufipes

Binomial name
- Nitidula rufipes (Linnaeus, 1767)

Synonyms
- Nitidula bicolor Dalla Torre, 1879; Nitidula castanea C. Sahlberg, 1820; Nitidula fulvipes (Geoffroy, 1785); Nitidula marginata Dalla Torre, 1879; Nitidula obscura Fabricius, 1776; Nitidula ossium Kirby, 1837

= Nitidula rufipes =

Species of beetle

Nitidula rufipes is a species of sap-feeding beetle in the family Nitidulidae. It is found in Europe Northern Asia (excluding China) and North America.
