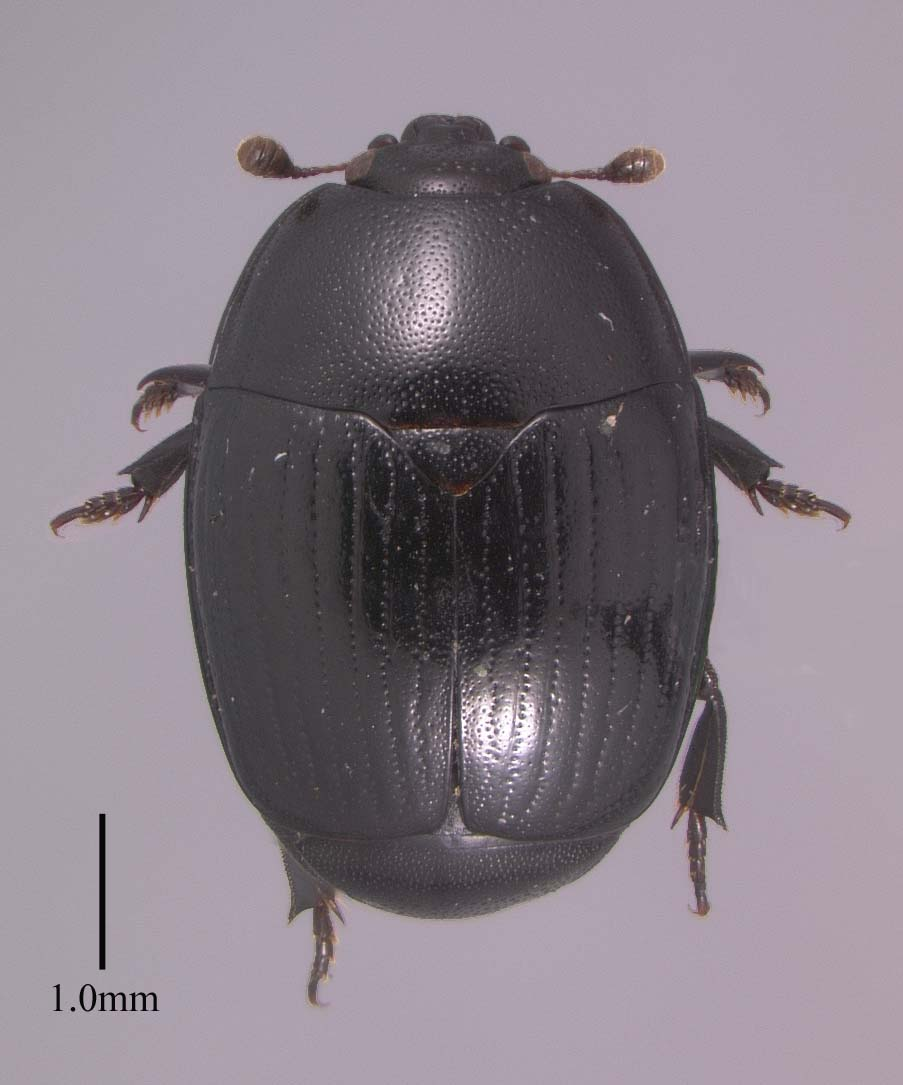

Scientific classification
- Domain: Eukaryota
- Kingdom: Animalia
- Phylum: Arthropoda
- Class: Insecta
- Order: Coleoptera
- Suborder: Polyphaga
- Infraorder: Cucujiformia
- Family: Nitidulidae
- Genus: Psilopyga
- Species: P. histrina

Binomial name
- Psilopyga histrina LeConte, 1853

= Psilopyga histrina =

Species of beetle

Psilopyga histrina, the black stinkhorn beetle, is a species of sap-feeding beetle in the family Nitidulidae. It is found in North America.
