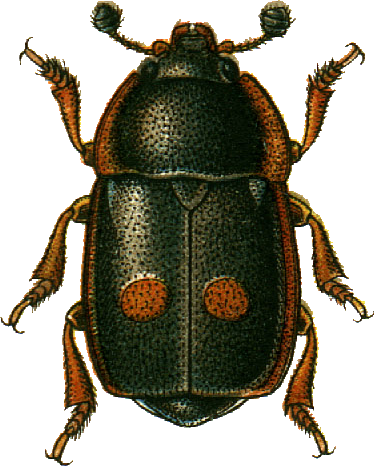
- Nitidula bipunctata

Scientific classification
- Domain: Eukaryota
- Kingdom: Animalia
- Phylum: Arthropoda
- Class: Insecta
- Order: Coleoptera
- Suborder: Polyphaga
- Infraorder: Cucujiformia
- Family: Nitidulidae
- Subfamily: Nitidulinae
- Tribe: Nitidulini
- Genus: Nitidula; Fabricius, 1775

= Nitidula =

Genus of beetles

Nitidula is a genus of sap-feeding beetles in the family Nitidulidae. There are more than 20 described species in Nitidula. Some species breed in carrion while others are associated with later stages of decay in mammalian corpses and can be used in forensic investigations (e.g., Nitidula carnaria, N. flavomaculata).

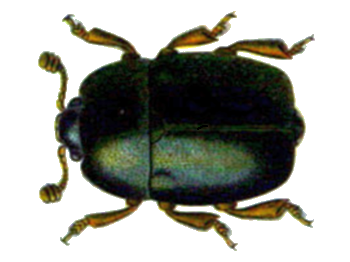
Nitidula rufipes

== Species ==
These 23 species belong to the genus Nitidula:

- Nitidula aemula Heer, 1862
- Nitidula ancora Heer, 1862
- Nitidula antarctica White, 1846
- Nitidula bipunctata (Linnaeus, 1758) (two-spotted sap beetle)
- Nitidula buprestoides Weber, 1801
- Nitidula carnaria (Schaller, 1783)
- Nitidula convexiuscula Mannerheim, 1843
- Nitidula dubia Gyllenhal, 1808
- Nitidula eremita Audisio, 1990
- Nitidula flavomaculata Rossi, 1790
- Nitidula lateralis White, 1846
- Nitidula maculigera Heer, 1862
- Nitidula melanaria Heer, 1847
- Nitidula nigra Schaeffer, 1911
- Nitidula orbiculata Gyllenhal, 1808
- Nitidula pallida Heer, 1862
- Nitidula prior Scudder, 1900
- Nitidula quadriguttata
- Nitidula radobojana Heer, 1847
- Nitidula robusta Meunier, 1922
- Nitidula rufipes (Linnaeus, 1767)
- Nitidula sulcata Herbst, 1793
- Nitidula ziczac Say, 1825
