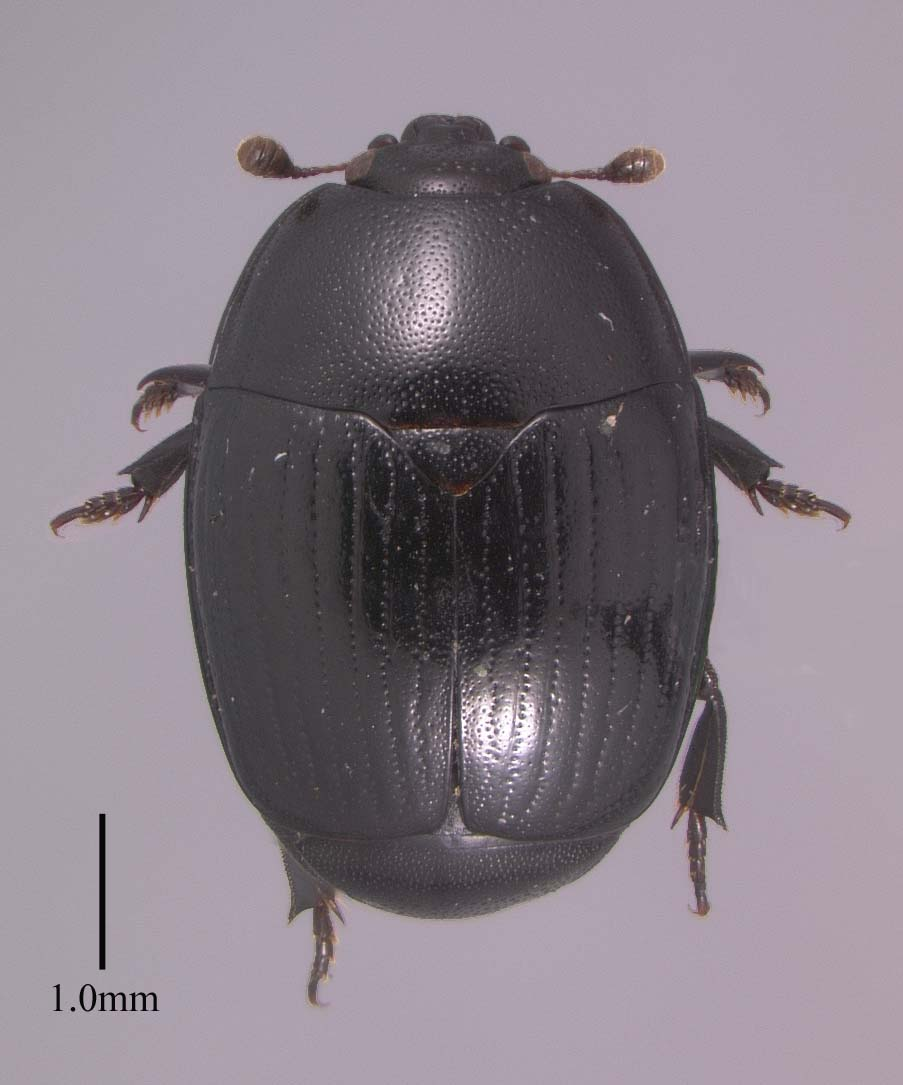

Scientific classification
- Kingdom: Animalia
- Phylum: Arthropoda
- Class: Insecta
- Order: Coleoptera
- Suborder: Polyphaga
- Infraorder: Cucujiformia
- Family: Nitidulidae
- Subfamily: Nitidulinae
- Genus: Psilopyga; LeConte, 1853

= Psilopyga =

Genus of beetles

Psilopyga is a genus of sap-feeding beetles in the family Nitidulidae. There are at least four described species in Psilopyga.

== Species ==
These four species belong to the genus Psilopyga:

- Psilopyga fasciata
- Psilopyga histrina LeConte, 1853 (black stinkhorn beetle)
- Psilopyga lata (Spornraft, 1971)
- Psilopyga nigripennis LeConte, 1863 (stinkhorn beetle)
