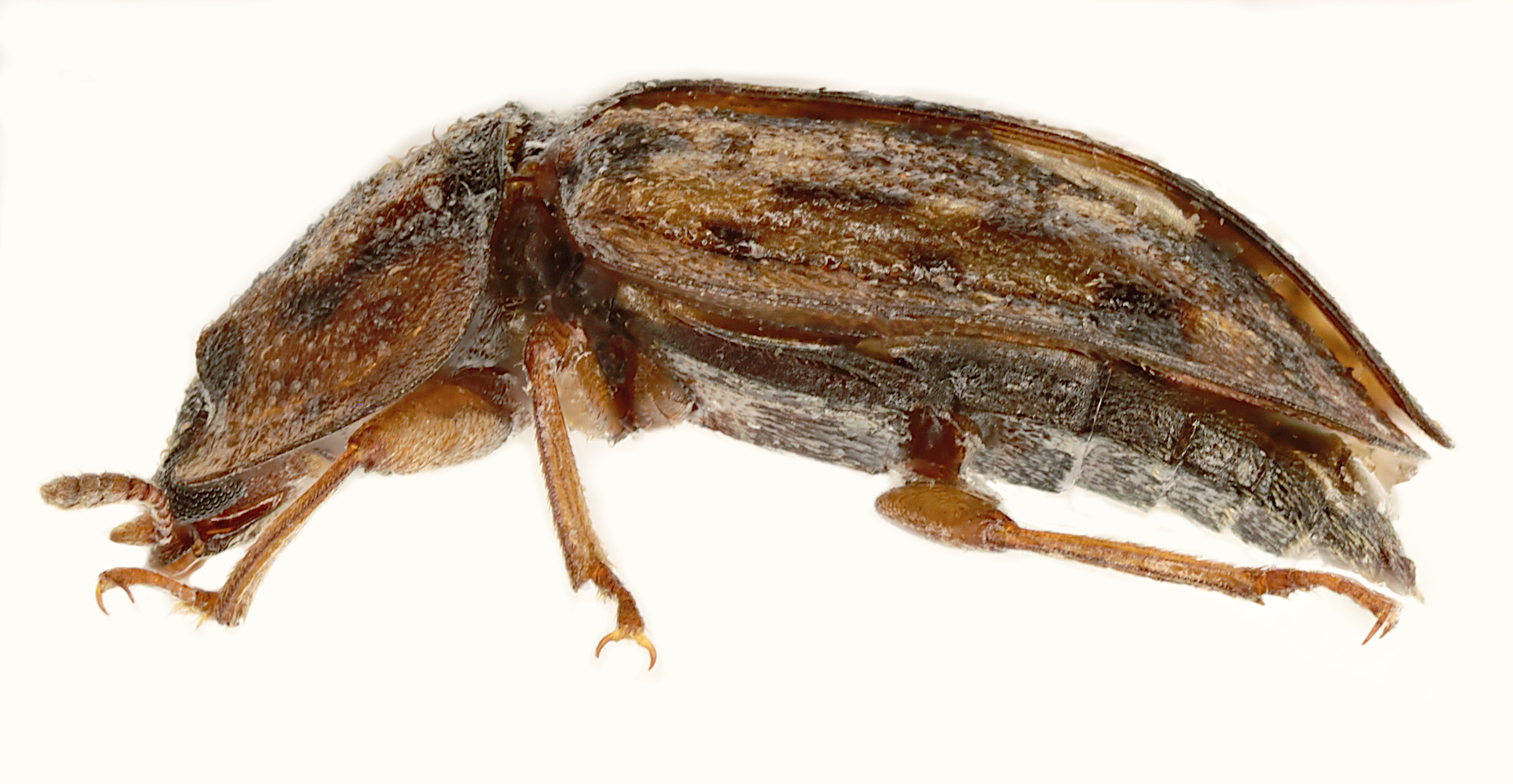

Scientific classification
- Kingdom: Animalia
- Phylum: Arthropoda
- Class: Insecta
- Order: Coleoptera
- Suborder: Polyphaga
- Infraorder: Cucujiformia
- Family: Nitidulidae
- Genus: Soronia
- Species: S. grisea

Binomial name
- Soronia grisea (Linnaeus, 1758)

= Soronia grisea =

Species of beetle

Soronia grisea is a species of sap-feeding beetle in the family Nitidulidae. It is found in Europe and Northern Asia (excluding China), North America, and Southern Asia.
