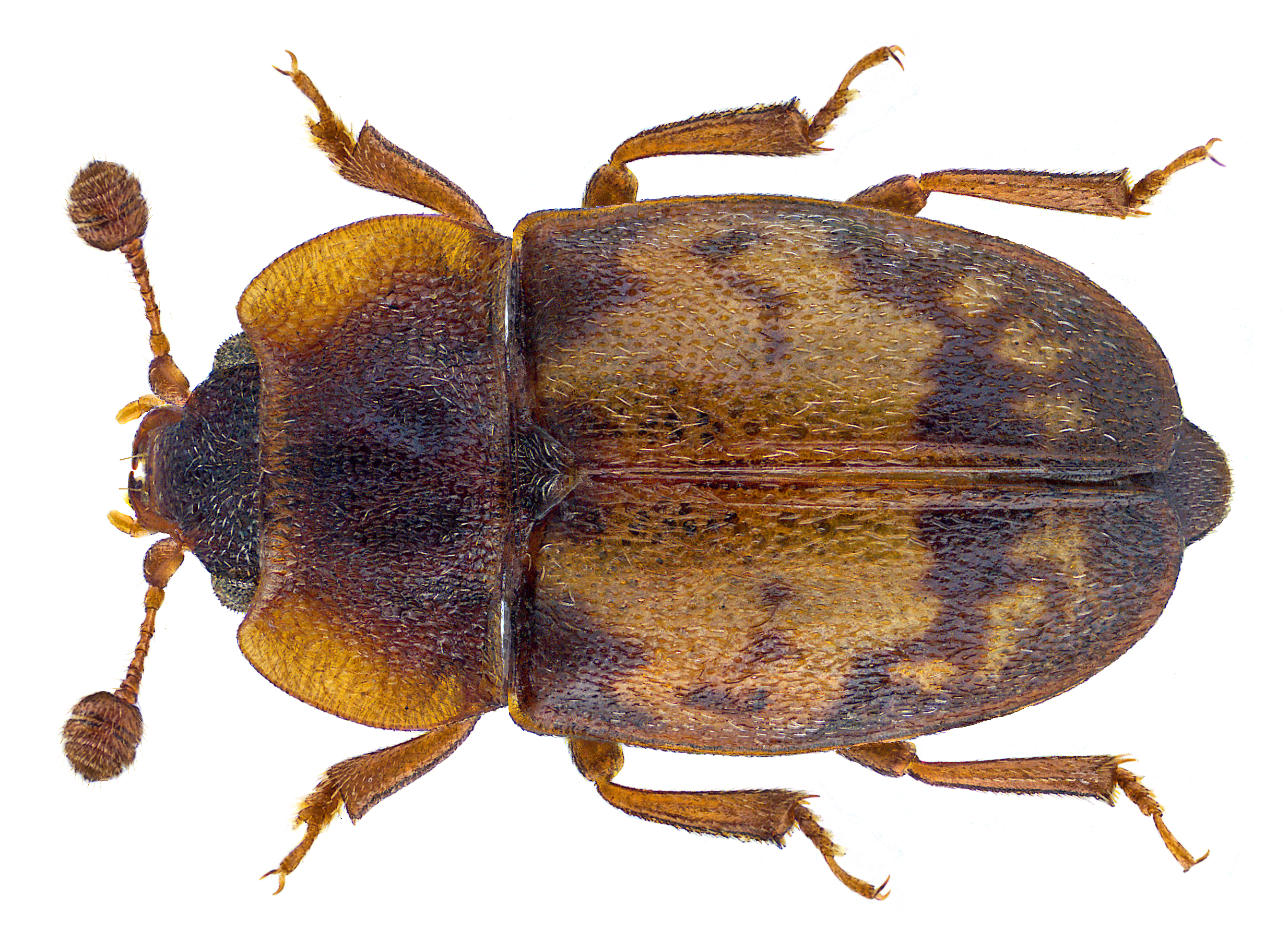

Scientific classification
- Domain: Eukaryota
- Kingdom: Animalia
- Phylum: Arthropoda
- Class: Insecta
- Order: Coleoptera
- Suborder: Polyphaga
- Infraorder: Cucujiformia
- Family: Nitidulidae
- Genus: Omosita
- Species: O. discoidea

Binomial name
- Omosita discoidea (Fabricius, 1775)

Synonyms
- Omosita cincta (Heer, 1841); Omosita inversa LeConte, 1857

= Omosita discoidea =

Species of beetle

Omosita discoidea is a species of sap-feeding beetle in the family Nitidulidae. It is found in Europe and Northern Asia (excluding China), North America, and Oceania.
