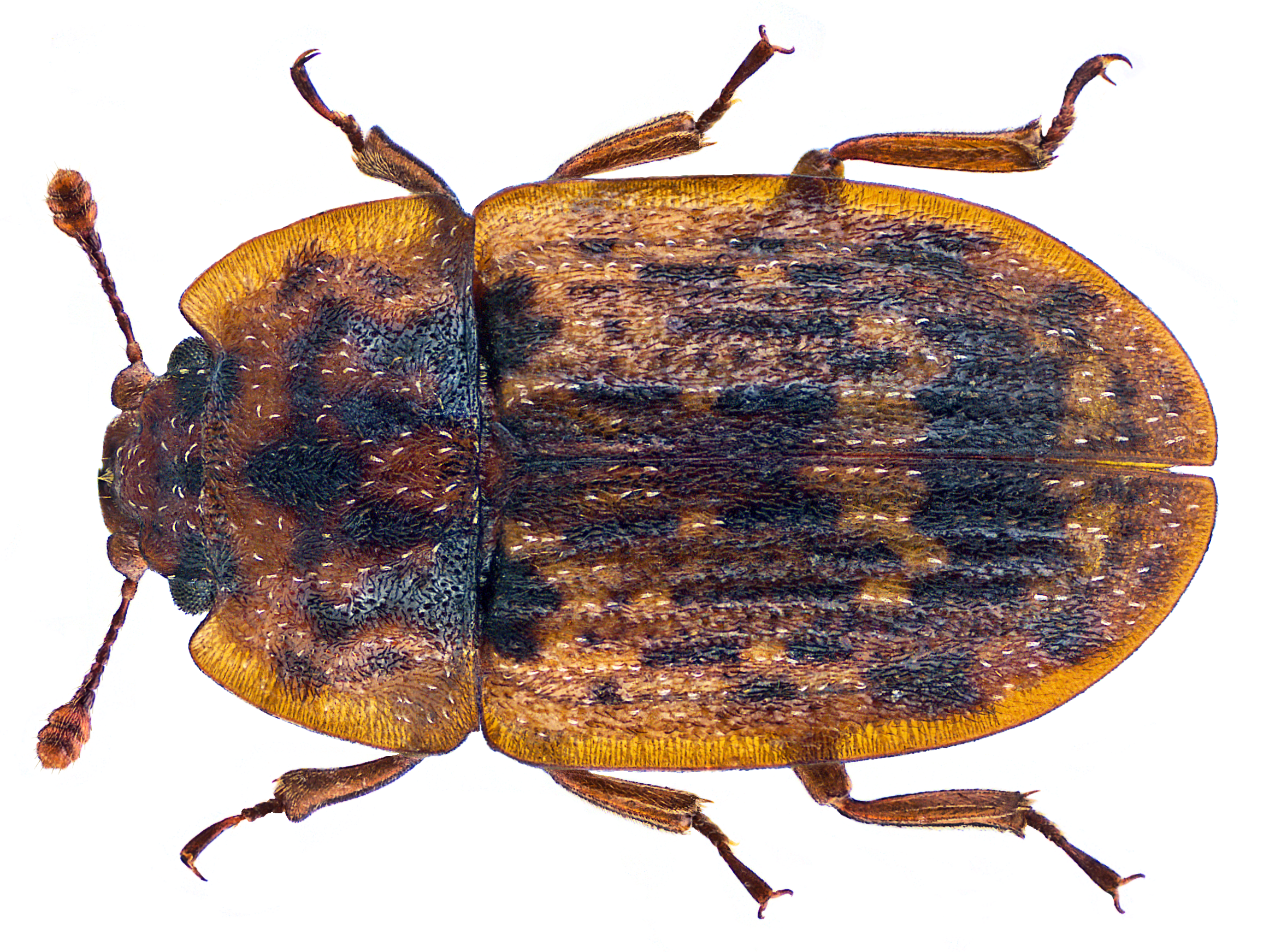

Scientific classification
- Kingdom: Animalia
- Phylum: Arthropoda
- Class: Insecta
- Order: Coleoptera
- Suborder: Polyphaga
- Infraorder: Cucujiformia
- Family: Nitidulidae
- Subfamily: Nitidulinae
- Tribe: Nitidulini
- Genus: Soronia; Erichson, 1843

= Soronia =

Genus of beetles

Soronia is a genus of sap-feeding beetles in the family Nitidulidae. There are about 14 described species in Soronia.

== Species ==
These 14 species belong to the genus Soronia:

- Soronia borbonica Grouvelle, 1899
- Soronia dorrigoi Kirejtshuk, 2004
- Soronia elongata Cameron, 1903
- Soronia glabra Kirejtshuk, 2004
- Soronia grisea (Linnaeus, 1758)
- Soronia guttulata (LeConte, 1863)
- Soronia hystrix Sharp, 1876
- Soronia madagascarensis Kirejtshuk, 2004
- Soronia merkli Kirejtshuk, 2005
- Soronia oblonga C.Brisout de Barneville, 1863
- Soronia optata Sharp, 1878
- Soronia punctatissima (Illiger, 1794)
- Soronia shibatai Hisamatsu & Hisamatsu, 2008
- Soronia substriata Hamilton, 1893
