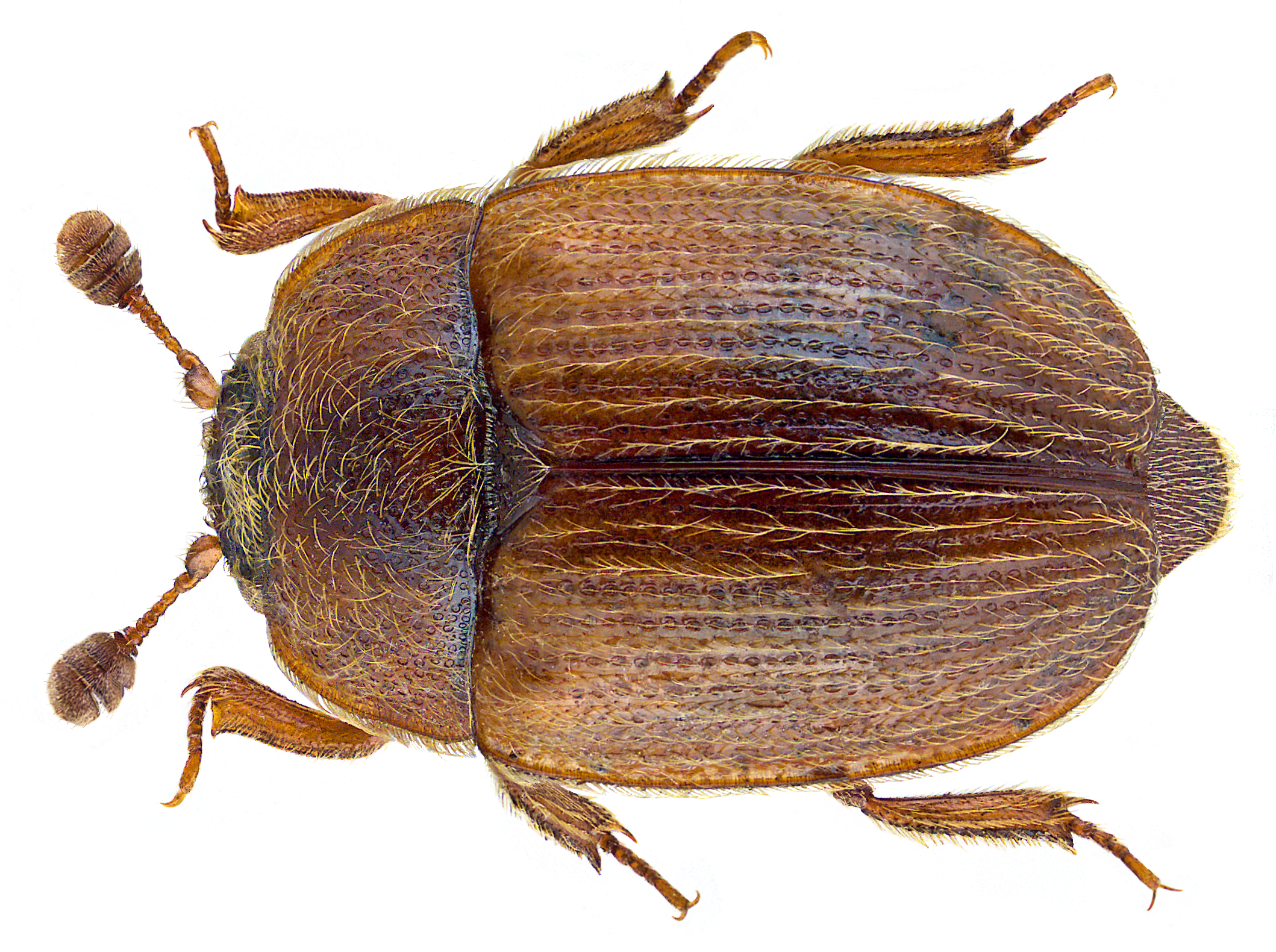
- Pocadius ferrugineus

Scientific classification
- Kingdom: Animalia
- Phylum: Arthropoda
- Class: Insecta
- Order: Coleoptera
- Suborder: Polyphaga
- Infraorder: Cucujiformia
- Family: Nitidulidae
- Subfamily: Nitidulinae
- Tribe: Nitidulini
- Genus: Pocadius; Erichson, 1843

= Pocadius =

Genus of beetles

Pocadius is a genus of sap-feeding beetles in the family Nitidulidae. There are about nine described species in Pocadius.

== Species ==
These nine species belong to the genus Pocadius:

- Pocadius adustus Reitter, 1888^{g}
- Pocadius basalis Schaeffer, 1911^{i c g}
- Pocadius centralis Cline, 2008^{i c g}
- Pocadius ferrugineus (Fabricius, 1775)^{g}
- Pocadius fulvipennis Erichson, 1843^{i c g b}
- Pocadius helvolus Erichson, 1843^{i c g b} (hairy puffball beetle)
- Pocadius luisalfredoi Cline, 2008^{i c g}
- Pocadius niger Parsons, 1936^{i c g}
- Pocadius tepicensis Cline, 2008^{i c g}

Data sources: i = ITIS, c = Catalogue of Life, g = GBIF, b = Bugguide.net
