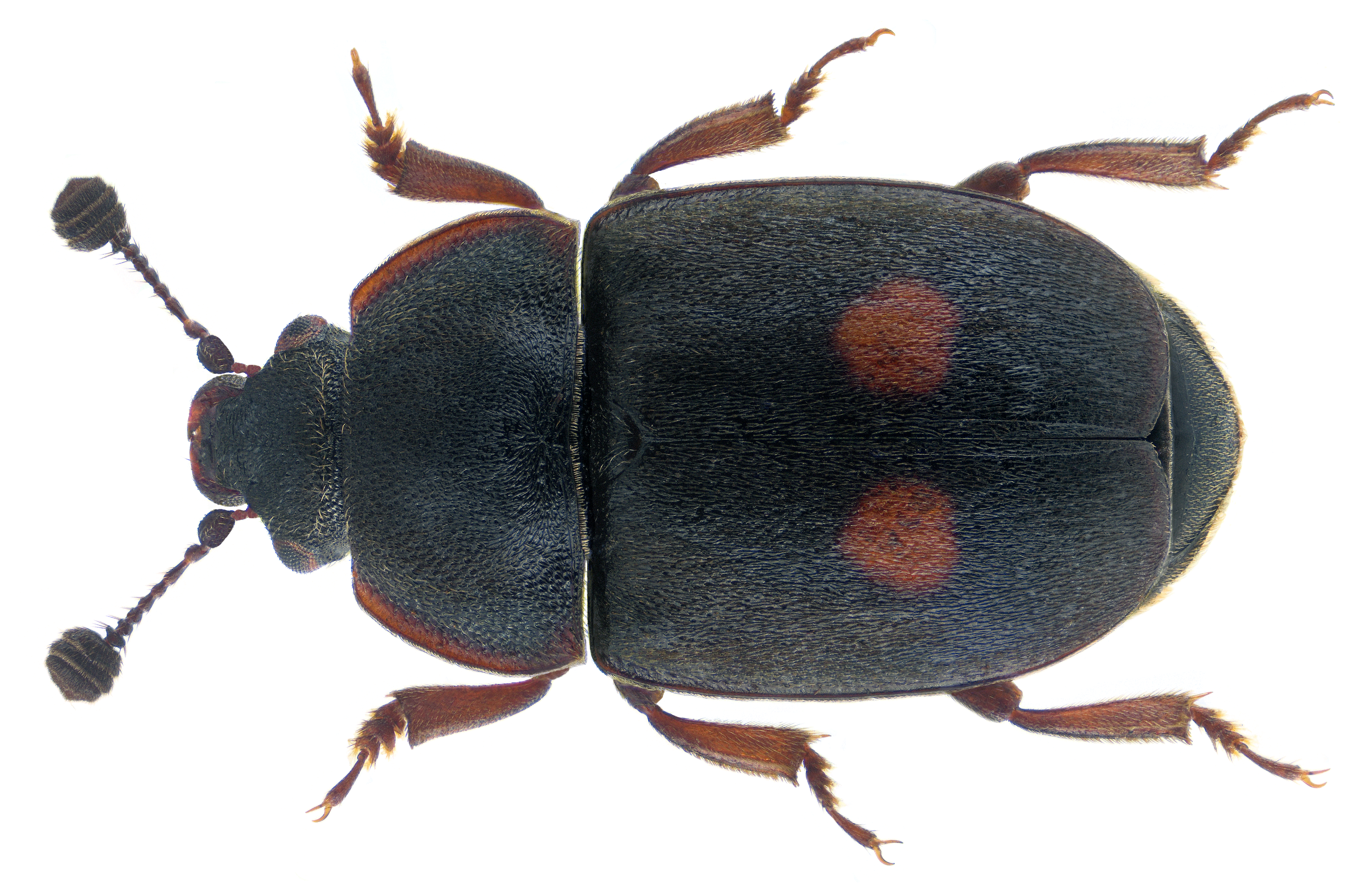

Scientific classification
- Kingdom: Animalia
- Phylum: Arthropoda
- Class: Insecta
- Order: Coleoptera
- Suborder: Polyphaga
- Infraorder: Cucujiformia
- Family: Nitidulidae
- Genus: Nitidula
- Species: N. bipunctata

Binomial name
- Nitidula bipunctata (Linnaeus, 1758)

Synonyms
- Nitidula bipustulata (Linnaeus, 1761); Nitidula impustulata Ganglbauer, 1899; Nitidula scaraboides (Scopoli, 1763)

= Nitidula bipunctata =

Species of beetle

Nitidula bipunctata, the two-spotted sap beetle, is a species of sap-feeding beetle in the family Nitidulidae. It is found in Europe and Northern Asia (excluding China) and North America.
