= Nitidula ziczac =

Scientific classification
- Domain: Eukaryota
- Kingdom: Animalia
- Phylum: Arthropoda
- Class: Insecta
- Order: Coleoptera
- Suborder: Polyphaga
- Infraorder: Cucujiformia
- Family: Nitidulidae
- Genus: Nitidula
- Species: N. ziczac

Binomial name
- Nitidula ziczac Say, 1825

Synonyms
- Nitidula humeralis LeConte, 1859; Nitidula inornata Horn, 1879; Nitidula uniguttata Melsheimer, 1846

Species of beetle

Nitidula ziczac is a species of sap-feeding beetle in the family Nitidulidae. It is found in Central America and North America.
