= Cyllodes biplagiatus =

Scientific classification
- Kingdom: Animalia
- Phylum: Arthropoda
- Class: Insecta
- Order: Coleoptera
- Suborder: Polyphaga
- Infraorder: Cucujiformia
- Family: Nitidulidae
- Genus: Cyllodes
- Species: C. biplagiatus

Binomial name
- Cyllodes biplagiatus LeConte, 1866

Species of beetle

Cyllodes biplagiatus is a species of sap-feeding beetle in the family Nitidulidae. It is found in North America.
