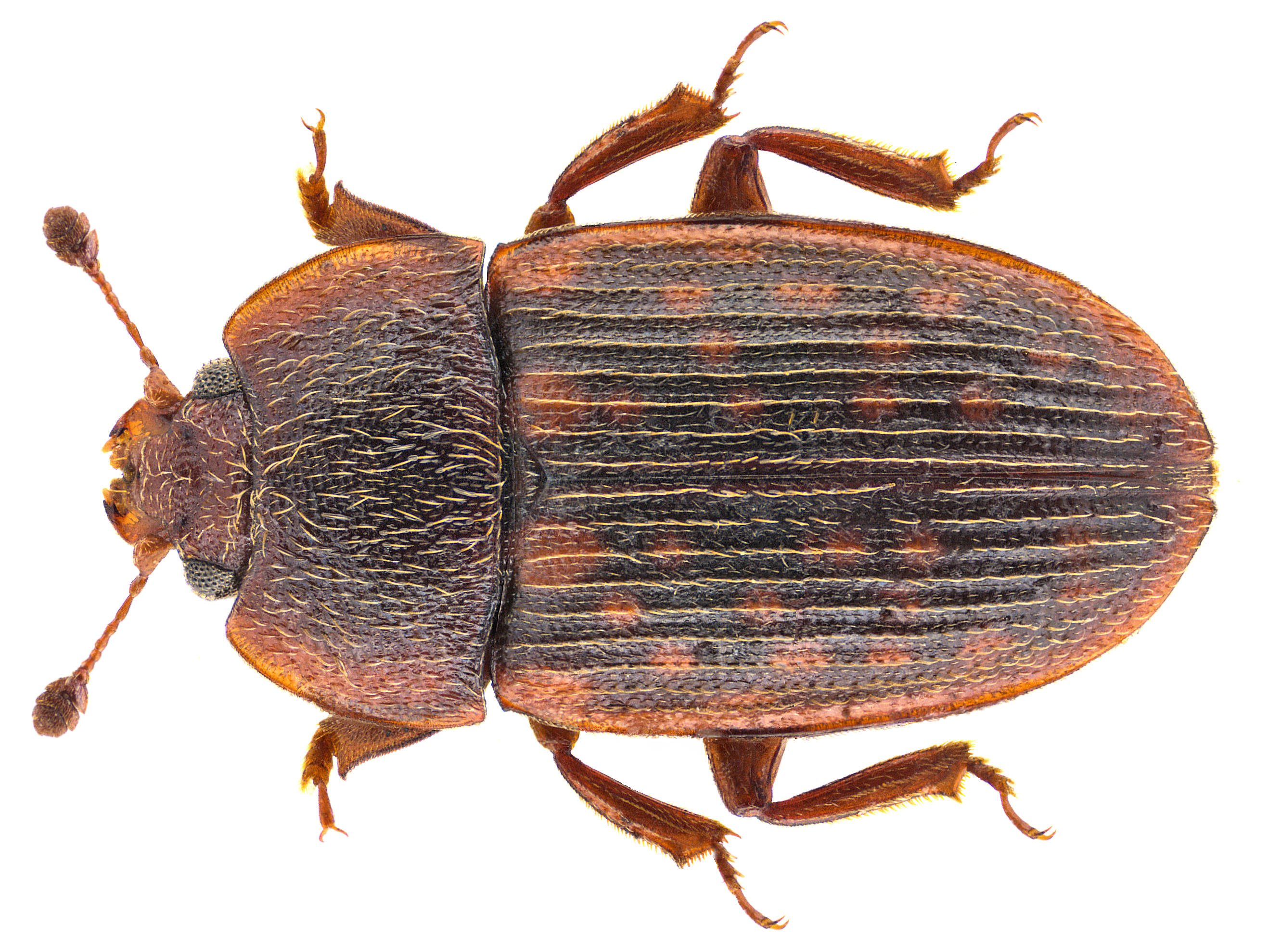
- Phenolia costipennis

Scientific classification
- Kingdom: Animalia
- Phylum: Arthropoda
- Class: Insecta
- Order: Coleoptera
- Suborder: Polyphaga
- Infraorder: Cucujiformia
- Family: Nitidulidae
- Subfamily: Nitidulinae
- Tribe: Nitidulini
- Genus: Phenolia; Erichson, 1843

= Phenolia =

Genus of beetles

Phenolia is a genus of sap-feeding beetles in the family Nitidulidae. There are about nine described species in Phenolia.

== Species ==
These nine species belong to the genus Phenolia:

- Phenolia amplificator Hisamatsu, 1956
- Phenolia angustitibialis Kirejtshuk & Kurochkin, 2010
- Phenolia attenuata (Reitter, 1879)
- Phenolia caucasicus (Kirejtshuk, 1990)
- Phenolia costipennis (Boheman, 1851)
- Phenolia grossa (Fabricius, 1801)
- Phenolia limbata (Fabricius, 1781)
- Phenolia oviformis Kirejtshuk, 2002
- Phenolia robusta Kirejtshuk, 2002
