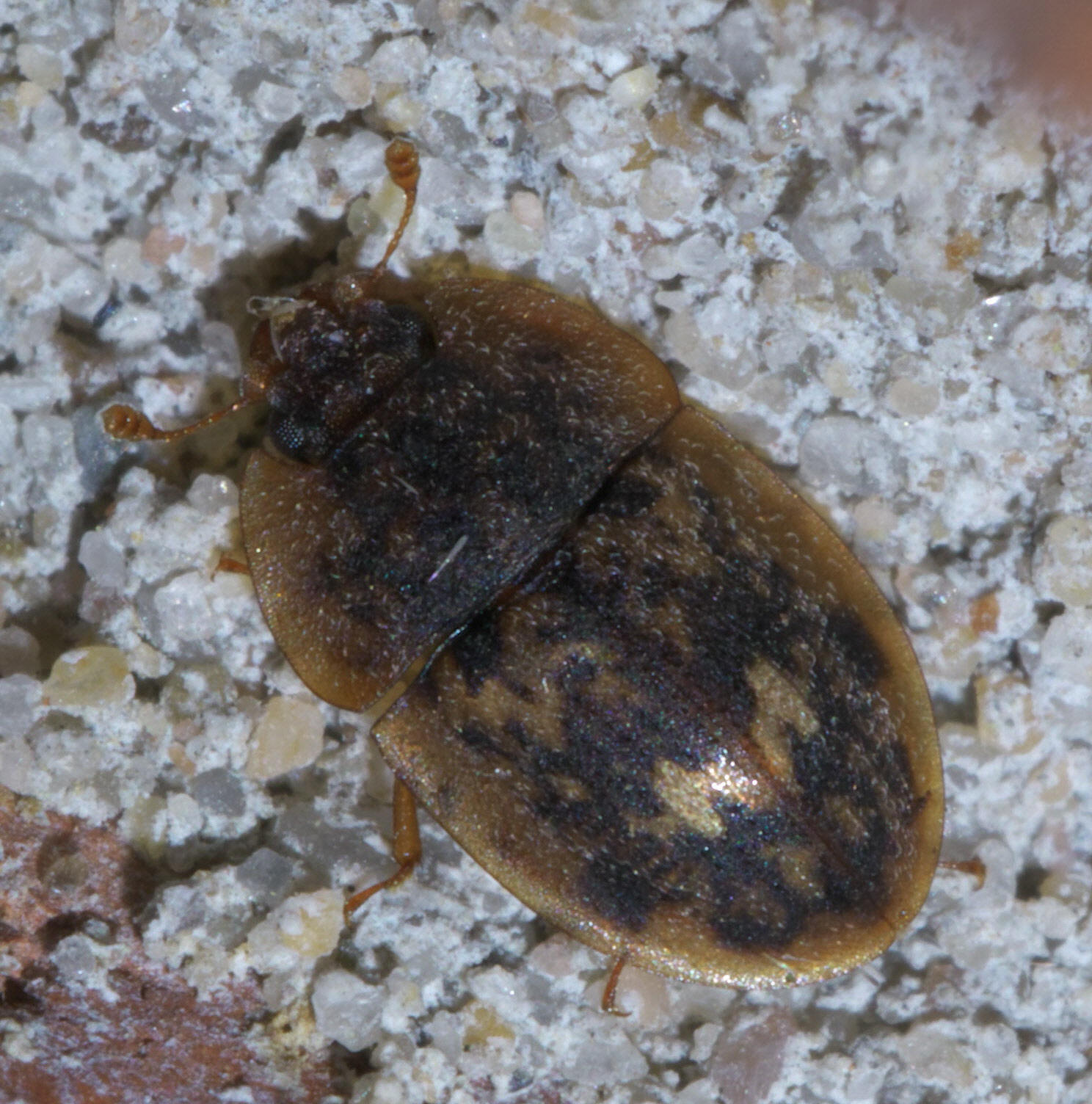

Scientific classification
- Domain: Eukaryota
- Kingdom: Animalia
- Phylum: Arthropoda
- Class: Insecta
- Order: Coleoptera
- Suborder: Polyphaga
- Infraorder: Cucujiformia
- Family: Nitidulidae
- Genus: Lobiopa
- Species: L. undulata

Binomial name
- Lobiopa undulata (Say, 1825)

= Lobiopa undulata =

Species of beetle

Lobiopa undulata is a species of sap-feeding beetle in the family Nitidulidae. It is found in North America.
