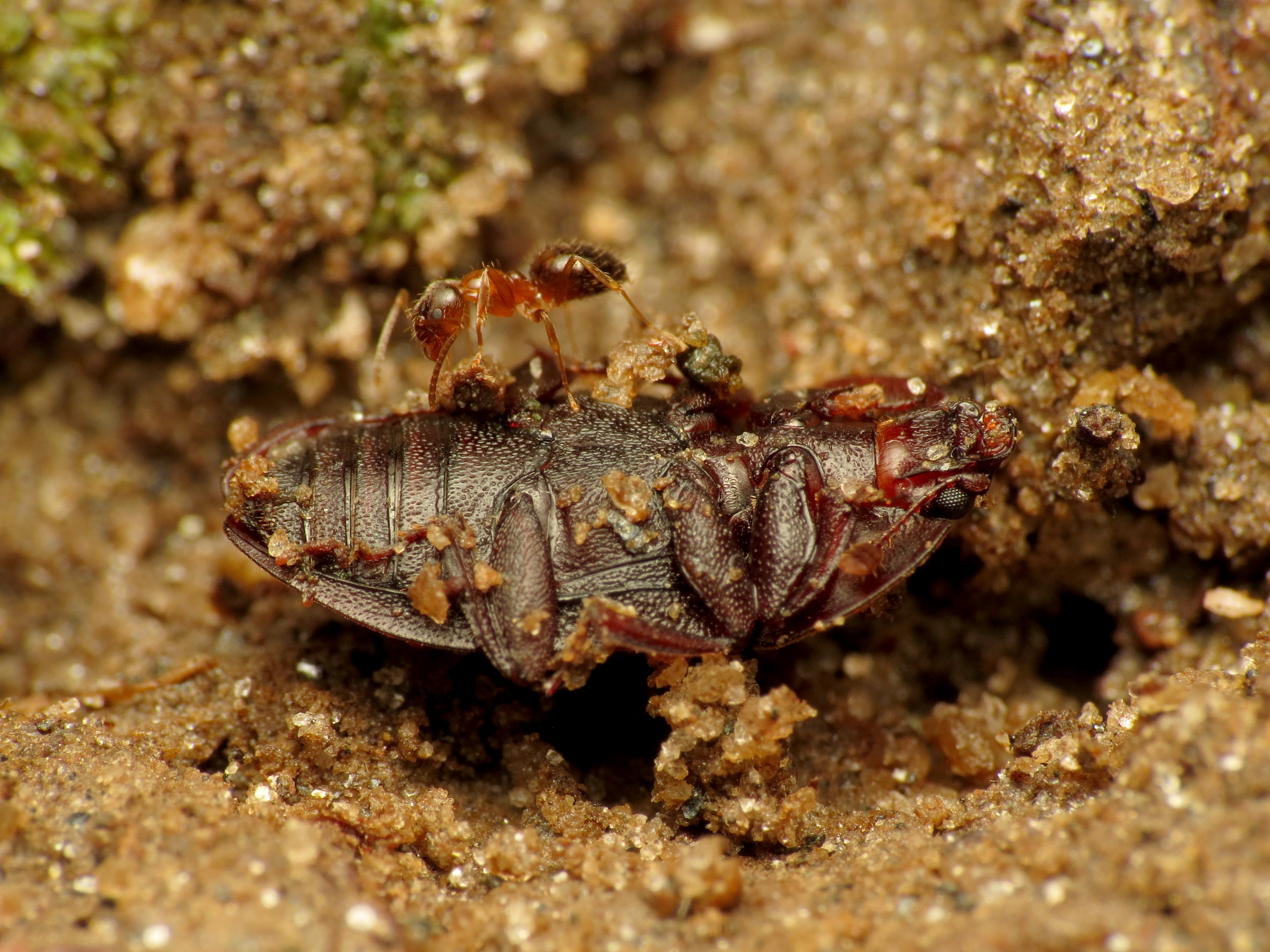

Scientific classification
- Domain: Eukaryota
- Kingdom: Animalia
- Phylum: Arthropoda
- Class: Insecta
- Order: Coleoptera
- Suborder: Polyphaga
- Infraorder: Cucujiformia
- Family: Nitidulidae
- Genus: Phenolia
- Species: P. grossa

Binomial name
- Phenolia grossa (Fabricius, 1801)

= Phenolia grossa =

Species of beetle

Phenolia grossa is a species of sap-feeding beetle in the family Nitidulidae. It is found in North America.
