= Camptodes =

Scientific classification
- Kingdom: Animalia
- Phylum: Arthropoda
- Class: Insecta
- Order: Coleoptera
- Suborder: Polyphaga
- Infraorder: Cucujiformia
- Family: Nitidulidae
- Subfamily: Nitidulinae
- Genus: Camptodes; Erichson, 1843

Genus of beetles

Camptodes is a genus of sap-feeding beetles in the family Nitidulidae. There are about nine described species in Camptodes.

== Species ==
These nine species belong to the genus Camptodes:

- Camptodes communis Erichson, 1843
- Camptodes contracta Erichson, 1843
- Camptodes czwalinai Reitter, 1875
- Camptodes gaumeri Sharp, 1890
- Camptodes helvola Erichson, 1843
- Camptodes nigerrimus Parsons, 1943
- Camptodes ornatus Motschulsky, 1863
- Camptodes texanus Schaeffer, 1904
- Camptodes viridipennis Fauvel, 1861
