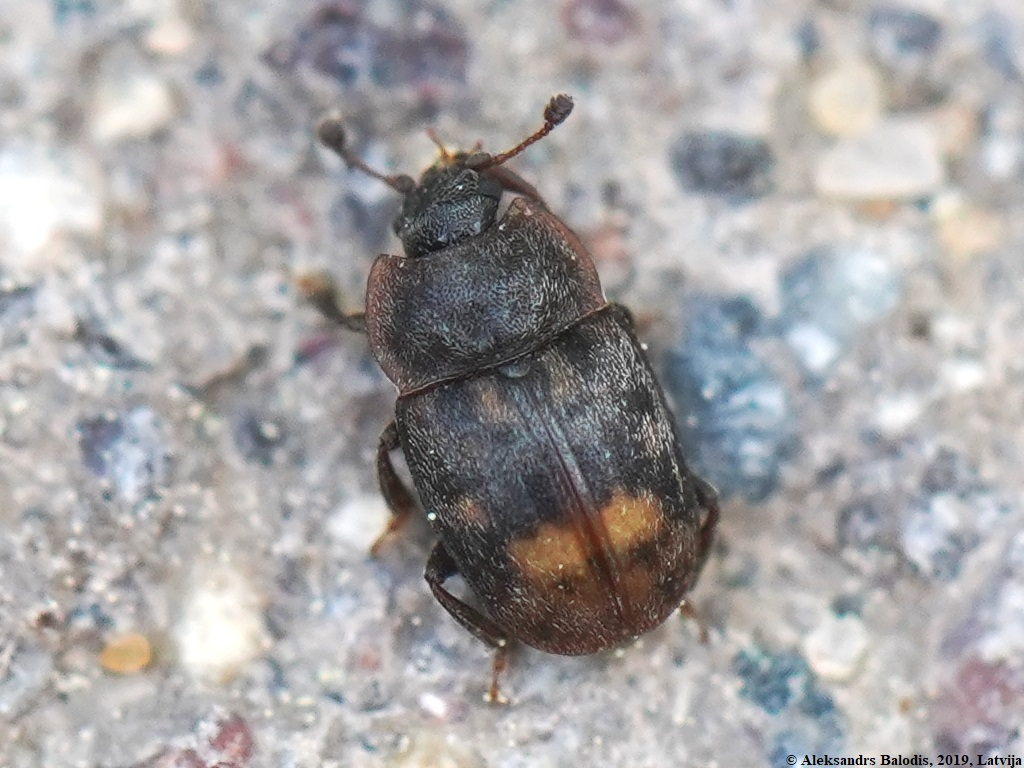

Scientific classification
- Kingdom: Animalia
- Phylum: Arthropoda
- Class: Insecta
- Order: Coleoptera
- Suborder: Polyphaga
- Infraorder: Cucujiformia
- Family: Nitidulidae
- Genus: Omosita
- Species: O. colon

Binomial name
- Omosita colon (Linnaeus, 1758)

Synonyms
- Omosita bipartita (Trost, 1801); Omosita haemorrhoidalis (Fabricius, 1776)

= Omosita colon =

Species of beetle

Omosita colon is a species of sap-feeding beetle in the family Nitidulidae. It is found in Europe and Northern Asia (excluding China), Central America, and North America.
