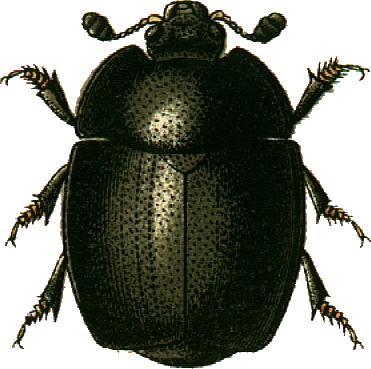
- Cyllodes ater

Scientific classification
- Kingdom: Animalia
- Phylum: Arthropoda
- Clade: Pancrustacea
- Class: Insecta
- Order: Coleoptera
- Suborder: Polyphaga
- Infraorder: Cucujiformia
- Family: Nitidulidae
- Subfamily: Nitidulinae
- Genus: Cyllodes; Erichson, 1843

= Cyllodes =

Genus of beetles

Cyllodes is a genus of sap-feeding beetles in the family Nitidulidae. There are about 14 described species in Cyllodes.

== Species ==
These 14 species belong to the genus Cyllodes:

- Cyllodes accentus Kirejtshuk, 1985
- Cyllodes ater (Herbst, 1792)
- Cyllodes bifascies (Walker, 1859)
- Cyllodes biplagiatus LeConte, 1866
- Cyllodes criptum Kirejtshuk, 2005
- Cyllodes literatus (Reitter, 1878)
- Cyllodes multimaculatus Grouvelle, 1913
- Cyllodes nakanei Hisamatsu, 1961
- Cyllodes pseudoliteratus Kirejtshuk, 2005
- Cyllodes punctidorsum Nakane & Hisamatsu, 1955
- Cyllodes quinquemaculatus Liu, Yang & Huang, 2016
- Cyllodes thomasi Cline & Skelley
- Cyllodes tigrinus Grouvelle, 1913
- Cyllodes trigrinus Grouvelle, 1913
