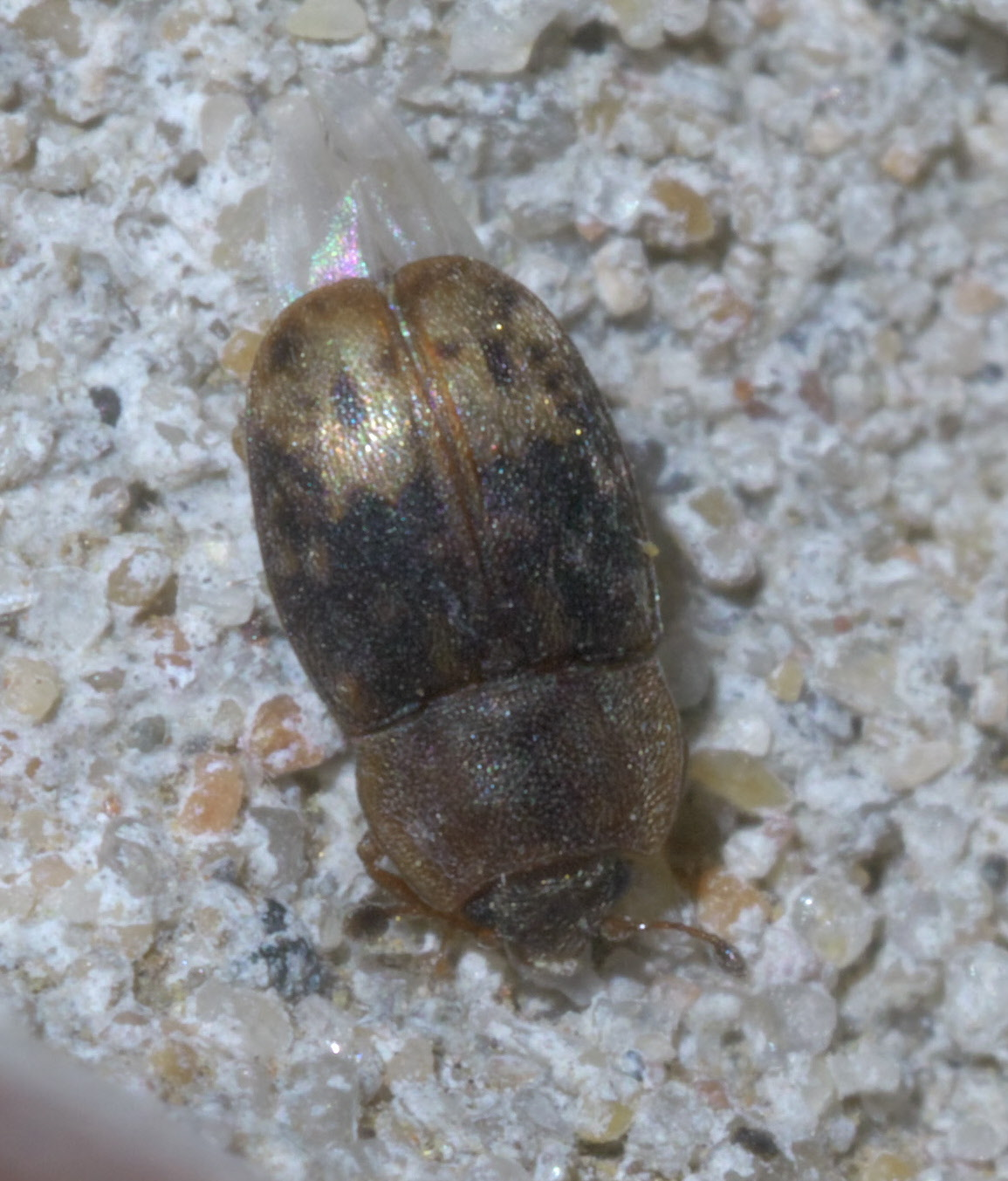
- Omosita nearctica

Scientific classification
- Kingdom: Animalia
- Phylum: Arthropoda
- Class: Insecta
- Order: Coleoptera
- Suborder: Polyphaga
- Infraorder: Cucujiformia
- Family: Nitidulidae
- Tribe: Nitidulini
- Genus: Omosita; Erichson, 1843

Synonyms
- Saprobia Ganglbauer, 1899

= Omosita =

Genus of beetles

Omosita is a genus of sap beetles, erected by Wilhelm Ferdinand Erichson in 1843.

== Species ==
These five species belong to the genus Omosita:

- Omosita colon (Linnaeus, 1758)^{i c g b}
- Omosita depressa (Linnaeus, 1758)^{g}
- Omosita discoidea (Fabricius, 1775)^{i c g b}
- Omosita funesta Reitter, 1873^{g}
- Omosita nearctica Kirejtshuk, 1987^{g b}

Data sources: i = ITIS, c = Catalogue of Life, g = GBIF, b = Bugguide.net
