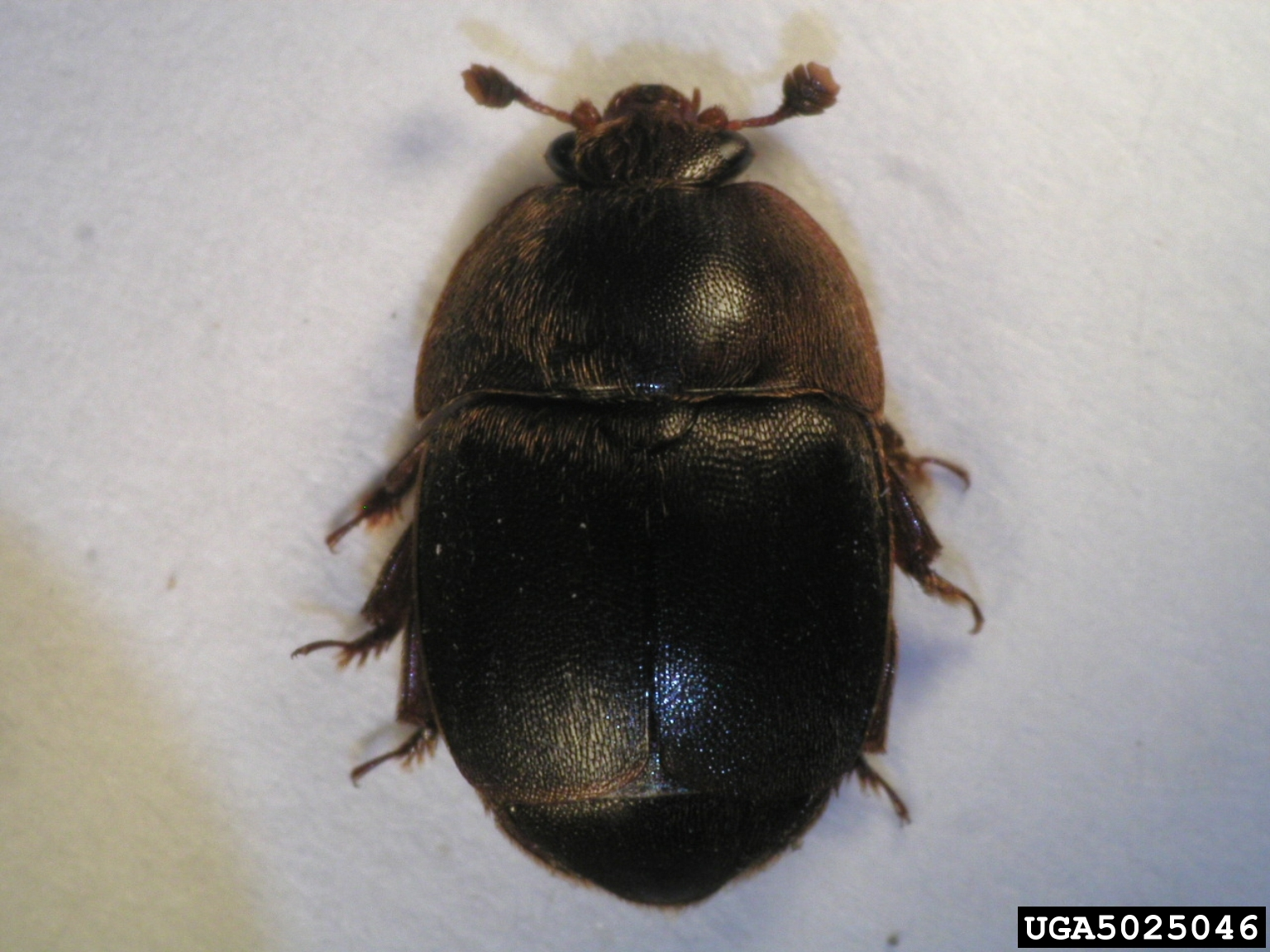
- Small hive beetle

Scientific classification
- Kingdom: Animalia
- Phylum: Arthropoda
- Class: Insecta
- Order: Coleoptera
- Suborder: Polyphaga
- Infraorder: Cucujiformia
- Family: Nitidulidae
- Tribe: Nitidulini
- Genus: Aethina; Erichson, 1843

= Aethina =

Genus of beetles

Aethina is a genus of beetles belonging to the family Nitidulidae.

The genus has almost cosmopolitan distribution.

Species:

- Aethina argus Grouvelle, 1890
- Aethina concinna Jelinek & Kirejtschuk, 1986
- Aethina concolor (Macleay, 1872)
- Aethina flavicollis Reitter, 1884
- Aethina inconspicua Nakane, 1967
- Aethina jelineki Kirejtshuk, 1986
- Aethina latens (Blanchard, 1853)
- Aethina pubescens Erichson, 1843
- Aethina quadrata Sharp, 1891
- Aethina suturalis
- Aethina tumida Murray, 1867
