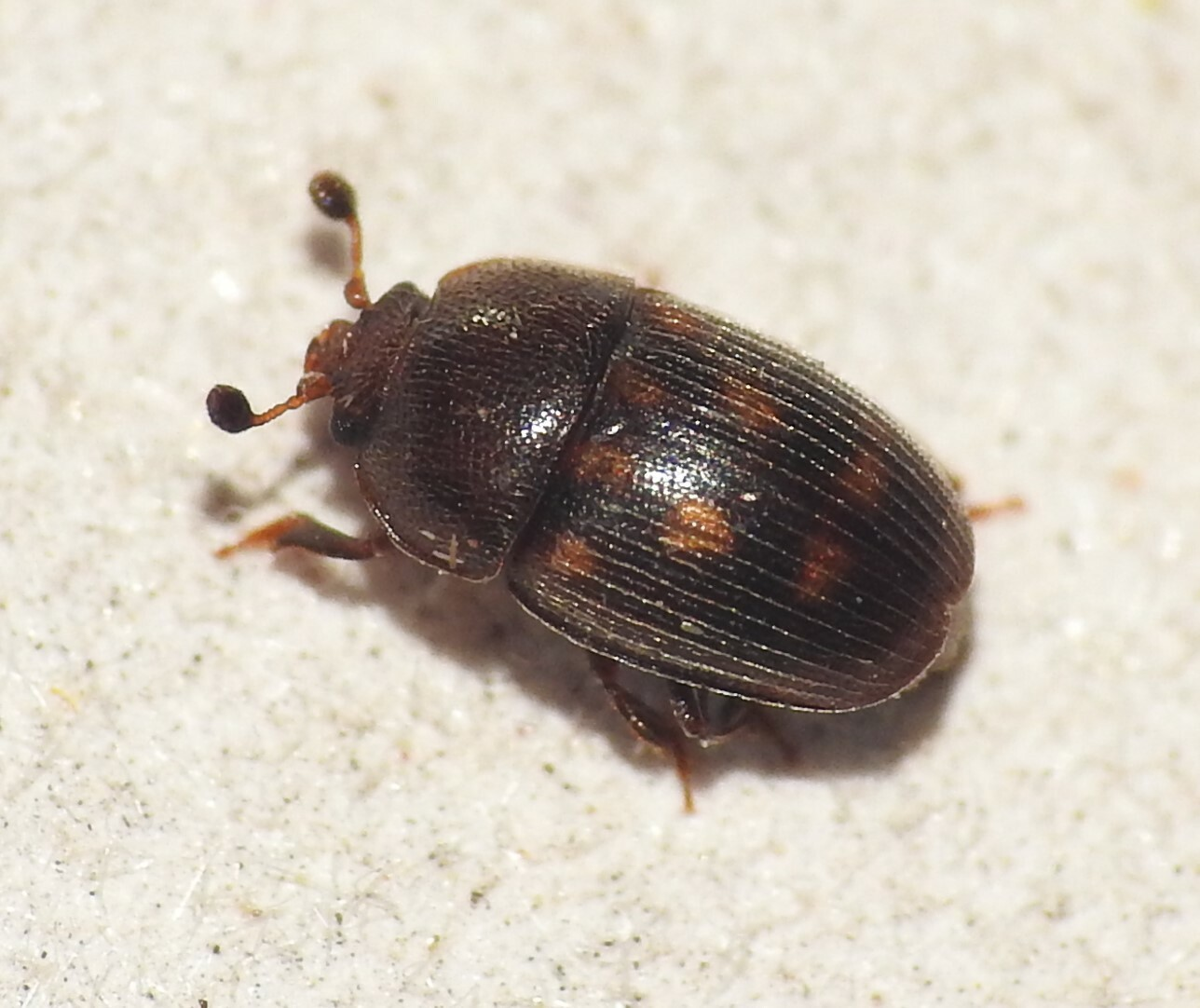
- Adult of undetermined Thalycrodes species (Talegalla Weir, Queensland, Australia)

Scientific classification
- Kingdom: Animalia
- Phylum: Arthropoda
- Clade: Pancrustacea
- Class: Insecta
- Order: Coleoptera
- Suborder: Polyphaga
- Infraorder: Cucujiformia
- Family: Nitidulidae
- Subfamily: Nitidulinae; Latreille, 1802

= Nitidulinae =

Subfamily of beetles

Nitidulinae is a subfamily of sap-feeding beetles in the family Nitidulidae.

== Selected genera ==
These are some out of the approximately 110 genera belonging to the subfamily Nitidulinae:

- Aethina Erichson, 1843 (= Tumida)
- Amphotis Erichson, 1843
- Atarphia Reitter 1884
- Camptodes Erichson, 1843
- Ceratochramus
- Cychramptodes Reitter, 1874 (= Pantocryptus)
- Cychramus Kugelann, 1794
- Cyllodes Erichson, 1843
- Hebascus Erichson, 1843
- Ipidia Erichson, 1843
- Lobiopa Erichson, 1843
- Miskoramus Kirejtshuk & Lawrence, 1992
- Neopallodes Reitter 1884
- Neopocadius
- Nitidula Fabricius, 1775
- Omosita Erichson, 1843
- Orthopeplus Horn, 1879
- Oxycnemus Erichson, 1843
- Pallodes Erichson, 1843
- Phenolia Erichson, 1843
- Pocadius Erichson, 1843
- Psilopyga LeConte, 1853
- Physoronia Reitter, 1884
- Soronia Erichson, 1843
- Stelidota Erichson, 1843
- Thalycra Erichson, 1843
- Thalycrodes
- Xenostrongylus
