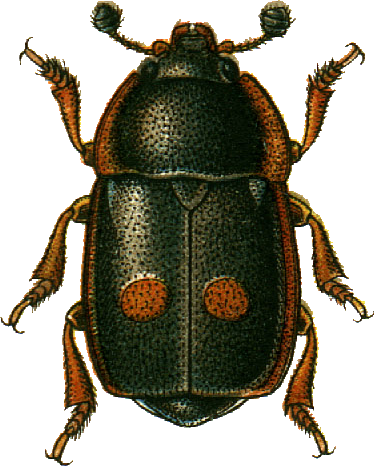
- Nitidula bipunctata

Scientific classification
- Kingdom: Animalia
- Phylum: Arthropoda
- Class: Insecta
- Order: Coleoptera
- Suborder: Polyphaga
- Infraorder: Cucujiformia
- Family: Nitidulidae
- Subfamily: Nitidulinae
- Tribe: Nitidulini; Latreille, 1802

= Nitidulini =

Tribe of beetles

Nitidulini is a tribe of sap-feeding beetles in the family Nitidulidae. There are about 10 genera and at least 20 described species in Nitidulini.

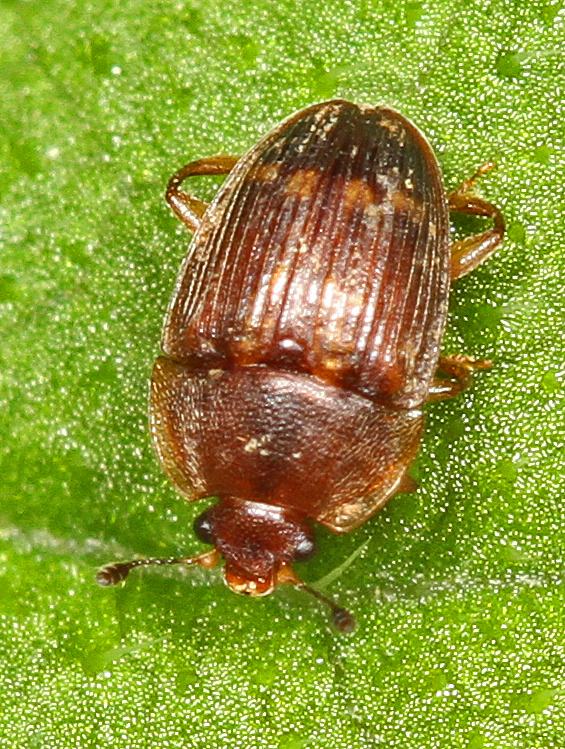
Stelidota geminata

== Genera ==
These 10 genera belong to the tribe Nitidulini:

- Aethina Erichson, 1843^{i c g b}
- Amphotis Erichson, 1843^{i c g b}
- Lobiopa Erichson, 1843^{i c g b}
- Nitidula Fabricius, 1775^{i c g b}
- Omosita Erichson, 1843^{i c g b}
- Phenolia Erichson, 1843^{i c g b}
- Pocadius Erichson, 1843^{i c g b}
- Soronia Erichson, 1843^{i c g b}
- Stelidota Erichson, 1843^{i c g b}
- Thalycra Erichson, 1843^{i c g b}

Data sources: i = ITIS, c = Catalogue of Life, g = GBIF, b = Bugguide.net
