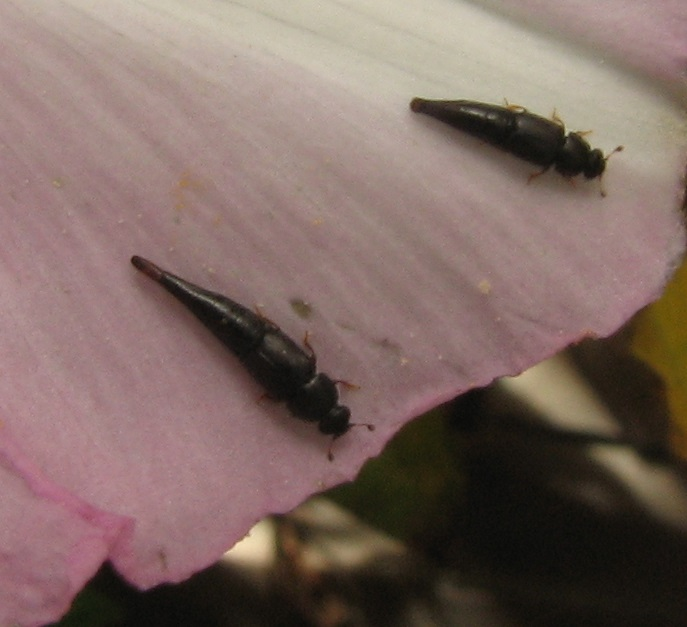
- Conotelus sp.

Scientific classification
- Kingdom: Animalia
- Phylum: Arthropoda
- Clade: Pancrustacea
- Class: Insecta
- Order: Coleoptera
- Suborder: Polyphaga
- Infraorder: Cucujiformia
- Family: Nitidulidae
- Subfamily: Cillaeinae; Kirejtshuk & Audisio in Kirejtshuk, 1986

= Cillaeinae =

Subfamily of beetles

Cillaeinae is a subfamily of sap-feeding beetles in the family Nitidulidae. There are about 9 genera and at least 150 described species in Cillaeinae.

== Genera ==
- Apetasimus Sharp in Sharp and Scott, 1908
- Brachypeplus Erichson, 1842
- Cillaeopeplus Sharp in Sharp and Scott, 1908
- Colopterus Erichson, 1842
- Conotelus Erichson, 1843
- Eupetinus Sharp in Sharp and Scott, 1908
- Gonioryctus Sharp, 1878
- Orthostolus Sharp in Sharp and Scott, 1908
- Prosopeus Murray, 1864
