= Conotelus fuscipennis =

Scientific classification
- Kingdom: Animalia
- Phylum: Arthropoda
- Class: Insecta
- Order: Coleoptera
- Suborder: Polyphaga
- Infraorder: Cucujiformia
- Family: Nitidulidae
- Genus: Conotelus
- Species: C. fuscipennis

Binomial name
- Conotelus fuscipennis Erichson, 1843

Synonyms
- Conotelus punctatus Schaeffer, 1911

Species of beetle

Conotelus fuscipennis is a species of sap-feeding beetle in the family Nitidulidae. It is found in North America.
