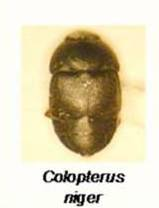
- Specimen of Colopterus niger

Scientific classification
- Kingdom: Animalia
- Phylum: Arthropoda
- Class: Insecta
- Order: Coleoptera
- Suborder: Polyphaga
- Infraorder: Cucujiformia
- Family: Nitidulidae
- Subfamily: Cillaeinae
- Genus: Colopterus; Erichson, 1842

= Colopterus =

Genus of beetles

Colopterus is a genus of sap-feeding beetles in the family Nitidulidae. There are about 10 described species in Colopterus.

== Species ==
- Colopterus floridanus Parry and Howden, 1976
- Colopterus gerhardi Dodge, 1939
- Colopterus maculatus (Erichson, 1843)
- Colopterus morio (Erichson, 1843)
- Colopterus niger
- Colopterus posticus (Erichson, 1889)
- Colopterus semitectus (Say, 1825)
- Colopterus testaceus Gillogly, 1969
- Colopterus truncatus (Randall, 1838)
- Colopterus unicolor (Say, 1825)
