= Colopterus maculatus =

Scientific classification
- Kingdom: Animalia
- Phylum: Arthropoda
- Class: Insecta
- Order: Coleoptera
- Suborder: Polyphaga
- Infraorder: Cucujiformia
- Family: Nitidulidae
- Genus: Colopterus
- Species: C. maculatus

Binomial name
- Colopterus maculatus (Erichson, 1843)

Species of beetle

Colopterus maculatus is a species of sap beetle in the family Nitidulidae. It is found in North America.
