= Colopterus posticus =

Scientific classification
- Kingdom: Animalia
- Phylum: Arthropoda
- Class: Insecta
- Order: Coleoptera
- Suborder: Polyphaga
- Infraorder: Cucujiformia
- Family: Nitidulidae
- Genus: Colopterus
- Species: C. posticus

Binomial name
- Colopterus posticus (Erichson, 1889)

Species of beetle

Colopterus posticus is a species of sap-feeding beetle in the family Nitidulidae. It is found in Central America and North America.
