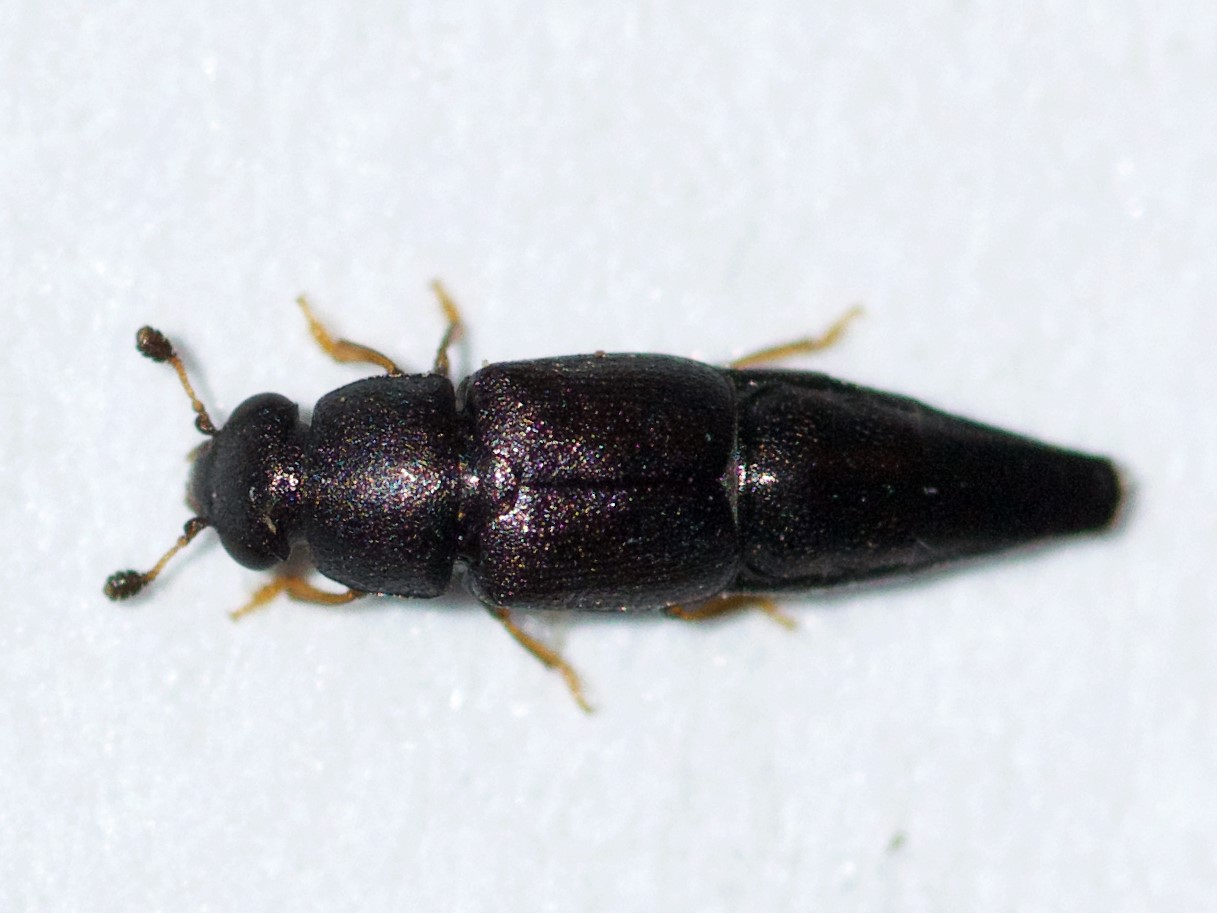

Scientific classification
- Kingdom: Animalia
- Phylum: Arthropoda
- Class: Insecta
- Order: Coleoptera
- Suborder: Polyphaga
- Infraorder: Cucujiformia
- Family: Nitidulidae
- Genus: Conotelus
- Species: C. obscurus

Binomial name
- Conotelus obscurus Erichson, 1843

= Conotelus obscurus =

Species of beetle

Conotelus obscurus, the obscure sap beetle, is a species of sap-feeding beetle in the family Nitidulidae. It is found in North America.
