= Colopterus truncatus =

Scientific classification
- Domain: Eukaryota
- Kingdom: Animalia
- Phylum: Arthropoda
- Class: Insecta
- Order: Coleoptera
- Suborder: Polyphaga
- Infraorder: Cucujiformia
- Family: Nitidulidae
- Genus: Colopterus
- Species: C. truncatus

Binomial name
- Colopterus truncatus (Randall, 1838)

Synonyms
- Colopterus infimus (Erichson, 1843); Colopterus limbatus (LeConte, 1858); Colopterus obliquus (LeConte, 1858); Colopterus triangularis (Murray, 1864)

Species of beetle

Colopterus truncatus is a species of sap-feeding beetle in the family Nitidulidae. It is found in the Caribbean Sea, Central America, North America, and South America.This particular sap beetle is thought to be one of the principal sap beetle vectors of oak wilt fungus in Minnesota.
