= Brachypeplus =

Scientific classification
- Kingdom: Animalia
- Phylum: Arthropoda
- Class: Insecta
- Order: Coleoptera
- Suborder: Polyphaga
- Infraorder: Cucujiformia
- Family: Nitidulidae
- Subfamily: Cillaeinae
- Genus: Brachypeplus; Erichson, 1842

Synonyms
- List: Grouvellepeplus Kirejtshuk, 2001; Liparopeplus Murray, 1864; Palaeopeplus Powell & Cline, 2021; Selis Murray, 1864; Tasmus Murray, 1864

Genus of beetles

Brachypeplus is a genus of sap-feeding beetles in the family Nitidulidae.

== Species ==
The following species are recognised in the genus Brachypeplus:

- Brachypeplus aequalis (Walker, 1858)
- Brachypeplus affinis Sharp, 1881
- Brachypeplus amplus Grouvelle, 1913
- Brachypeplus apicalis Murray, 1864
- Brachypeplus barronensis Blackburn, 1902
- Brachypeplus basalis Erichson, 1842
- Brachypeplus binotatus Murray, 1864
- Brachypeplus blandus Murray, 1864
- Brachypeplus brevicornis Sharp, 1878
- Brachypeplus deyrollei Murray, 1864
- Brachypeplus dorsalis Grouvelle, 1897
- Brachypeplus glaber LeConte, 1878
- Brachypeplus habecki Cline & Skelley
- Brachypeplus inaequalis Sharp, 1878
- Brachypeplus instriatus Kirejtshuk & Kovalev, 2022
- Brachypeplus kemblensis Blackburn, 1902
- Brachypeplus latus Murray, 1864
- Brachypeplus macleayi N.S.Murray, 1864
- Brachypeplus makarovi Kirejtshuk & Kovalev, 2022
- Brachypeplus mauli Gardner & Classey, 1962
- Brachypeplus nypicola Kirejtshuk & Kovalev, 2022
- Brachypeplus olinda Blackburn & Sharp, 1885
- Brachypeplus planus Erichson, 1842
- Brachypeplus similis Grouvelle, 1898
- Brachypeplus tenuis Murray, 1864
- Brachypeplus vicinus Sharp, 1889
- Brachypeplus wattsensis Blackburn, 1902
- Brachypeplus xanthorrhoeae Lea, 1925
- Palaeopeplus cascus Powell & Cline, 2021
- BOLD:ACB4129 (Brachypeplus sp.)
