= Conotelus mexicanus =

Scientific classification
- Domain: Eukaryota
- Kingdom: Animalia
- Phylum: Arthropoda
- Class: Insecta
- Order: Coleoptera
- Suborder: Polyphaga
- Infraorder: Cucujiformia
- Family: Nitidulidae
- Genus: Conotelus
- Species: C. mexicanus

Binomial name
- Conotelus mexicanus Murray, 1864

Species of beetle

Conotelus mexicanus is a species of sap-feeding beetle in the family Nitidulidae. It is found in Central America, North America, and Oceania.
