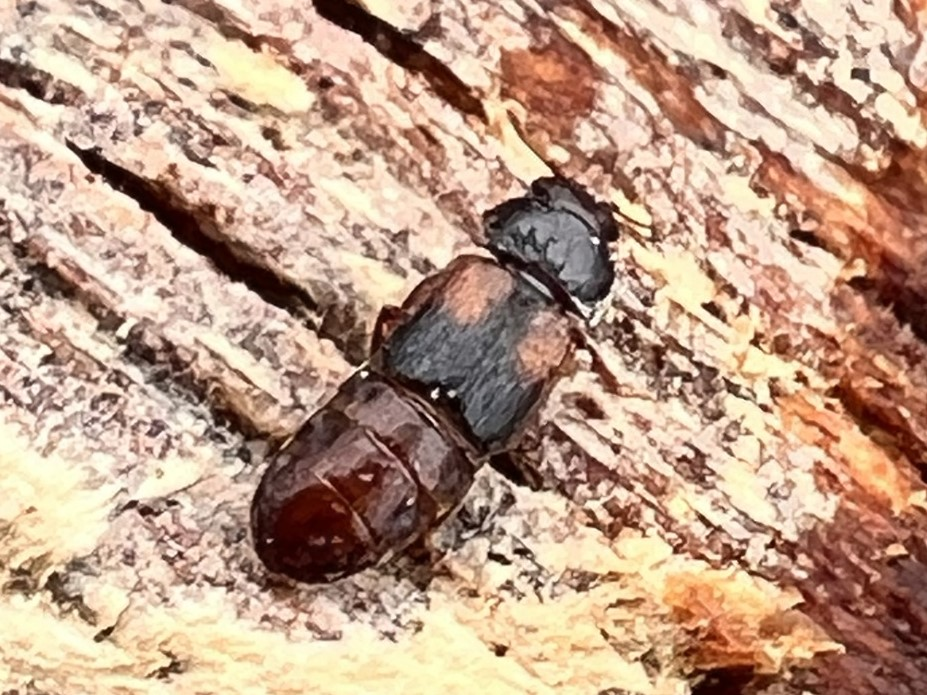

Scientific classification
- Kingdom: Animalia
- Phylum: Arthropoda
- Class: Insecta
- Order: Coleoptera
- Suborder: Polyphaga
- Infraorder: Cucujiformia
- Family: Nitidulidae
- Genus: Brachypeplus
- Species: B. glaber

Binomial name
- Brachypeplus glaber LeConte, 1878

= Brachypeplus glaber =

Species of beetle

Brachypeplus glaber is a species of sap-feeding beetle in the family Nitidulidae. It is found in North America.
