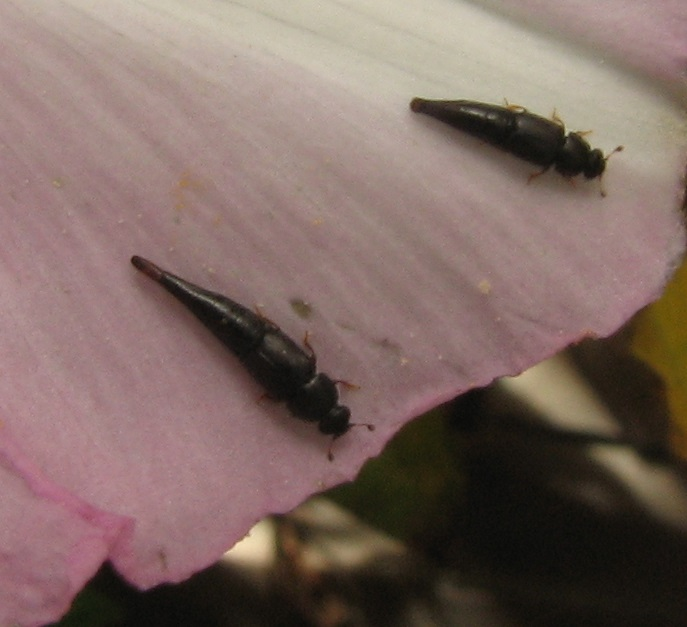

Scientific classification
- Kingdom: Animalia
- Phylum: Arthropoda
- Class: Insecta
- Order: Coleoptera
- Suborder: Polyphaga
- Infraorder: Cucujiformia
- Family: Nitidulidae
- Subfamily: Cillaeinae
- Genus: Conotelus; Erichson, 1843

= Conotelus =

Genus of beetles

Conotelus is a genus of sap-feeding beetles in the family Nitidulidae. There are at least four described species in Conotelus.

== Species ==
These four species belong to the genus Conotelus.

- Conotelus fuscipennis Erichson, 1843
- Conotelus mexicanus Murray, 1864
- Conotelus obscurus Erichson, 1843 (obscure sap beetle)
- Conotelus stenoides Murray, 1864
