= Colopterus semitectus =

Scientific classification
- Domain: Eukaryota
- Kingdom: Animalia
- Phylum: Arthropoda
- Class: Insecta
- Order: Coleoptera
- Suborder: Polyphaga
- Infraorder: Cucujiformia
- Family: Nitidulidae
- Genus: Colopterus
- Species: C. semitectus

Binomial name
- Colopterus semitectus (Say, 1825)

Species of beetle

Colopterus semitectus is a species of sap-feeding beetle in the family Nitidulidae. It is found in North America.
