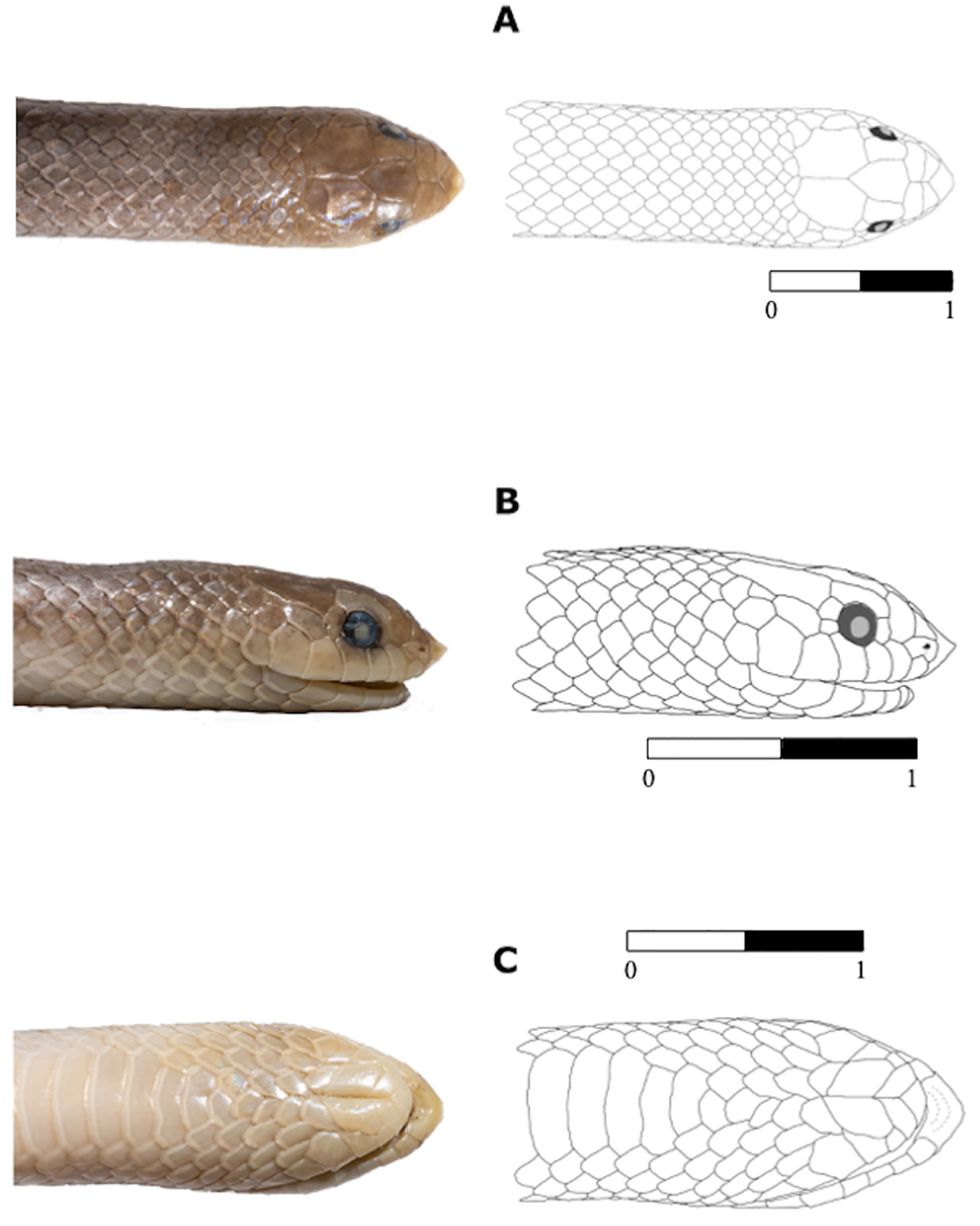

Scientific classification
- Kingdom: Animalia
- Phylum: Chordata
- Class: Reptilia
- Order: Squamata
- Suborder: Serpentes
- Family: Colubridae
- Genus: Yakacoatl; Cisneros-Bernal et al., 2025
- Species: Y. tlalli

Binomial name
- Yakacoatl tlalli Cisneros-Bernal et al., 2025
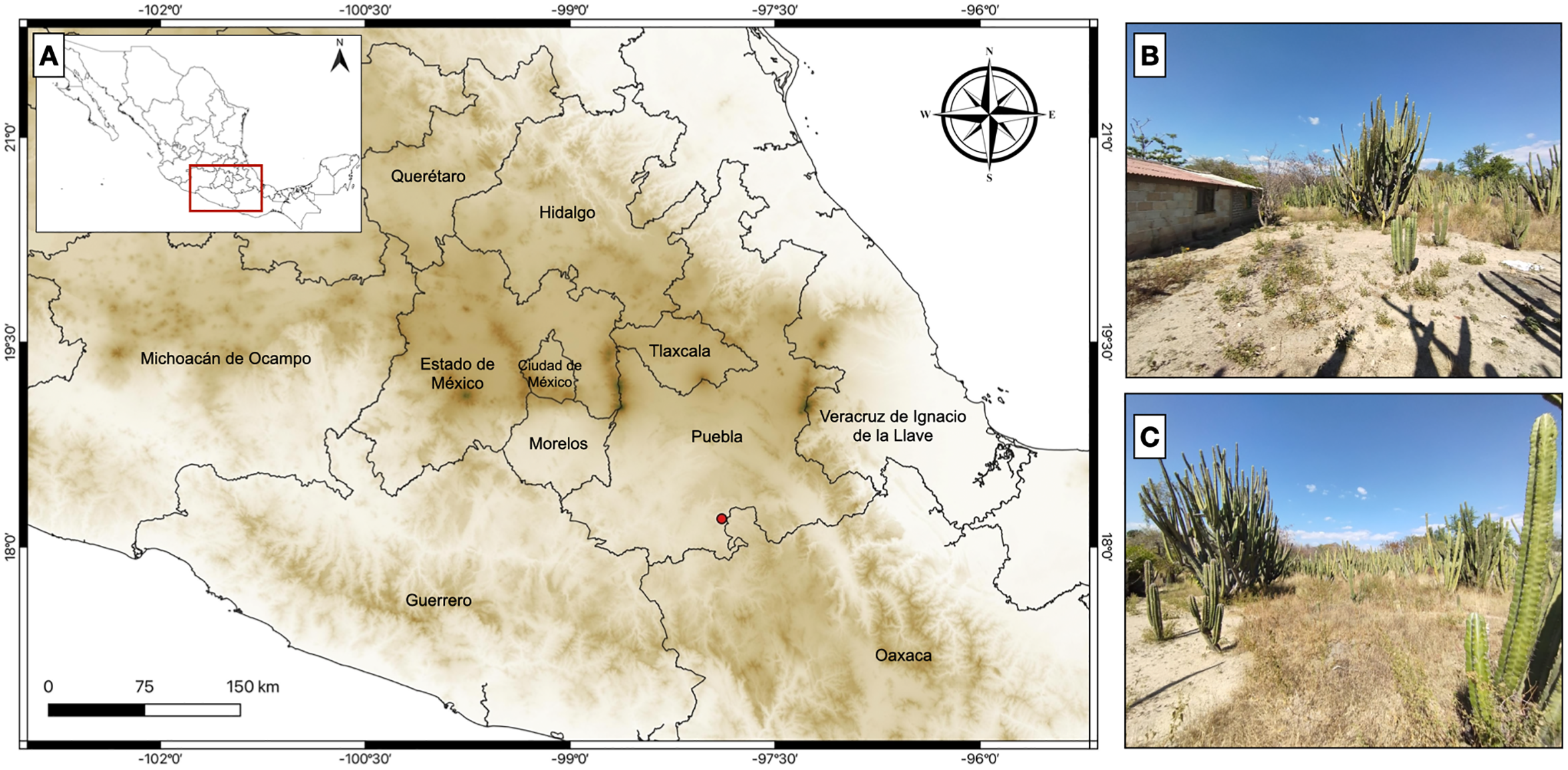
- Type locality of Y. tlalli [●]

= Yakacoatl =

Genus of snakes

Yakacoatl (lit. 'nose snake') is a genus of snake in the family Colubridae. It is one of around 16 snake genera endemic to Mexico, found in the seasonally dry forests of the Balsas Basin in Puebla. The genus contains a single species, Yakacoatl tlalli, which is closely to Pseudoficimia and Sympholis, two other monotypic Mexican genera in the tribe Sonorini. Yakacoatl is characterized by a smoke-grey colored dorsum and cream-colored ventral surface, with a prominent, upturned rostral scale.

== Discovery ==
Two specimens of Yakacoatl are known, and both were found already dead in the same region near San Jerónimo Xayacatlán.An adult male specimen was collected in November 2014 in a crop field after having been preyed upon by a domestic chicken. It is accessioned at the Museum of Zoology (UNAM) as MZFC-HE 37100, and assigned as the holotype of Y. tlalli. It measures 38.1 centimetres (15.0 in) in total length. A second dehydrated specimen of a juvenile male was collected nearby in May 2015. It is accessioned at the University of Texas at Arlington in the United States as UTA R-66192, assigned as a paratype.

== Etymology ==
The generic name, Yakacoatl, is derived from the Nahuatl words yacatl, meaning 'nose', and coatl, meaning 'snake', alluding to the species' pointed, nose-like rostral scale. The specific name, "tlalli", is a Nahuatl word meaning 'earth' or 'land', referring to the likely fossorial (living in burrows) behavior or the species, inferred from its anatomy and relatives.

== Natural history ==
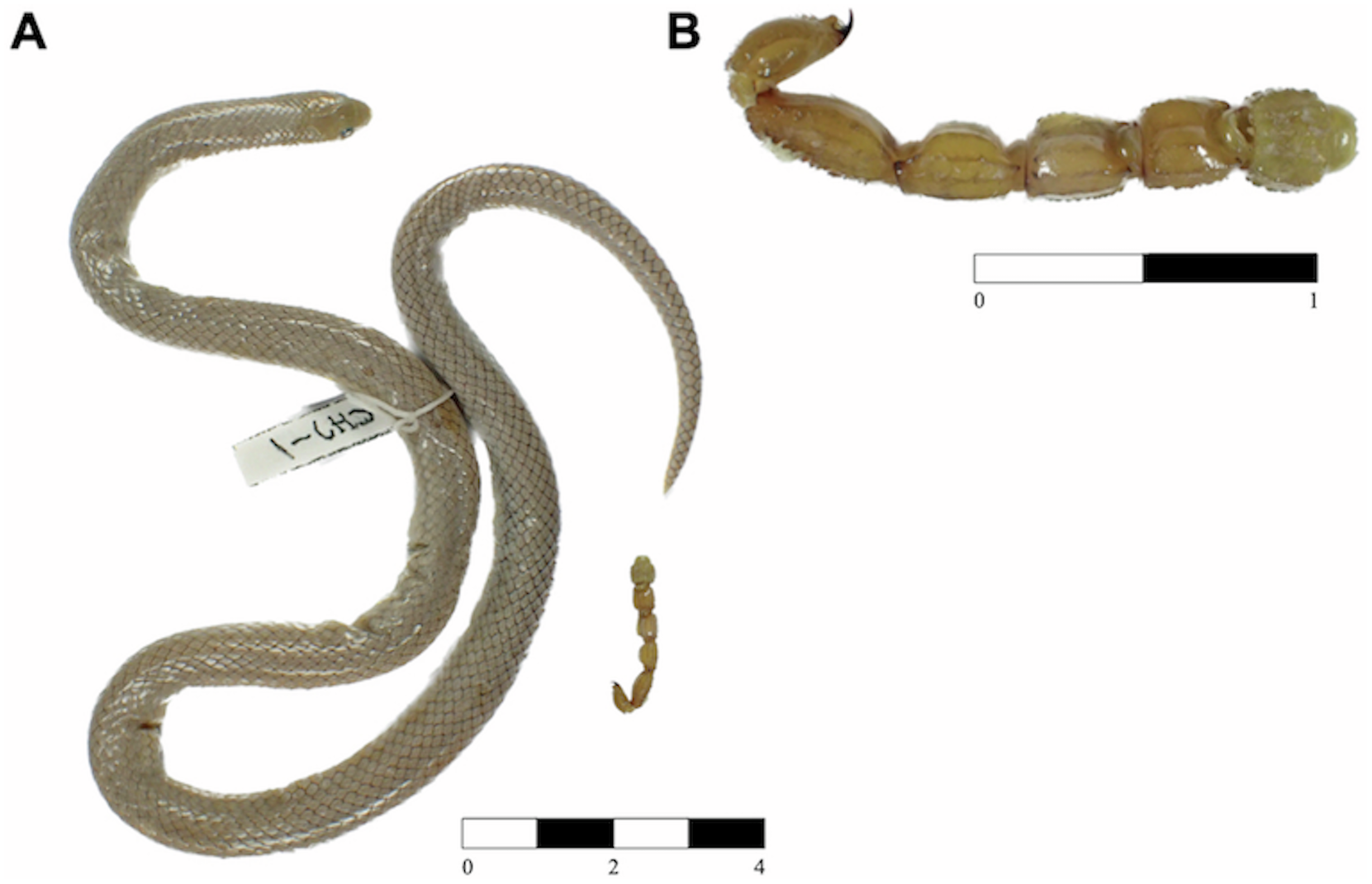
Y. tlalli holotype with consumed scorpion tail

As both known Yakacoatl specimens were found dead, the exact ecology of the genus can not be determined. The original vegetation at the type locality is a tropical deciduous forest, although it has since been fragmented by agricultural activity. It likely inhabits xerophilous (low water) zones far from areas of current human inhabitation. The short and compact anatomy of the skull indicates it is likely a fossorial (burrowing) animal, living primarily underground. The large fangs in the back of the skull imply an arthropod-specialized diet. This is supported by the discovery of a scorpion tail (genus Diplocentrus) in the stomach of the holotype individual. Related species are also known to eat spiders and centipedes.

== Classification ==
In their 2025 description of Yakacoatl, Cisneros-Bernal and colleagues tested its phylogenetic relationships with other members of the Colubridae. They recovered it in a clade comprising several species traditionally placed in the tribe Sonorini. More precisely, it was placed as the sister taxon to Pseudoficimia frontalis (false ficimia) in a clade also including Sympholis lippiens (Mexican short-tail snake). These results are displayed in the cladogram below, showing the relationships of Yakacoatl with other sonorin genera:

- Sonorini
  - Sonora
  - - - Scolecophis
      - Tantilla
    - - - Conopsis
        - Stenorrhina
      - - - Ficimia
          - Gyalopion
        - - Sympholis
          - - Pseudoficimia
            - Yakacoatl
