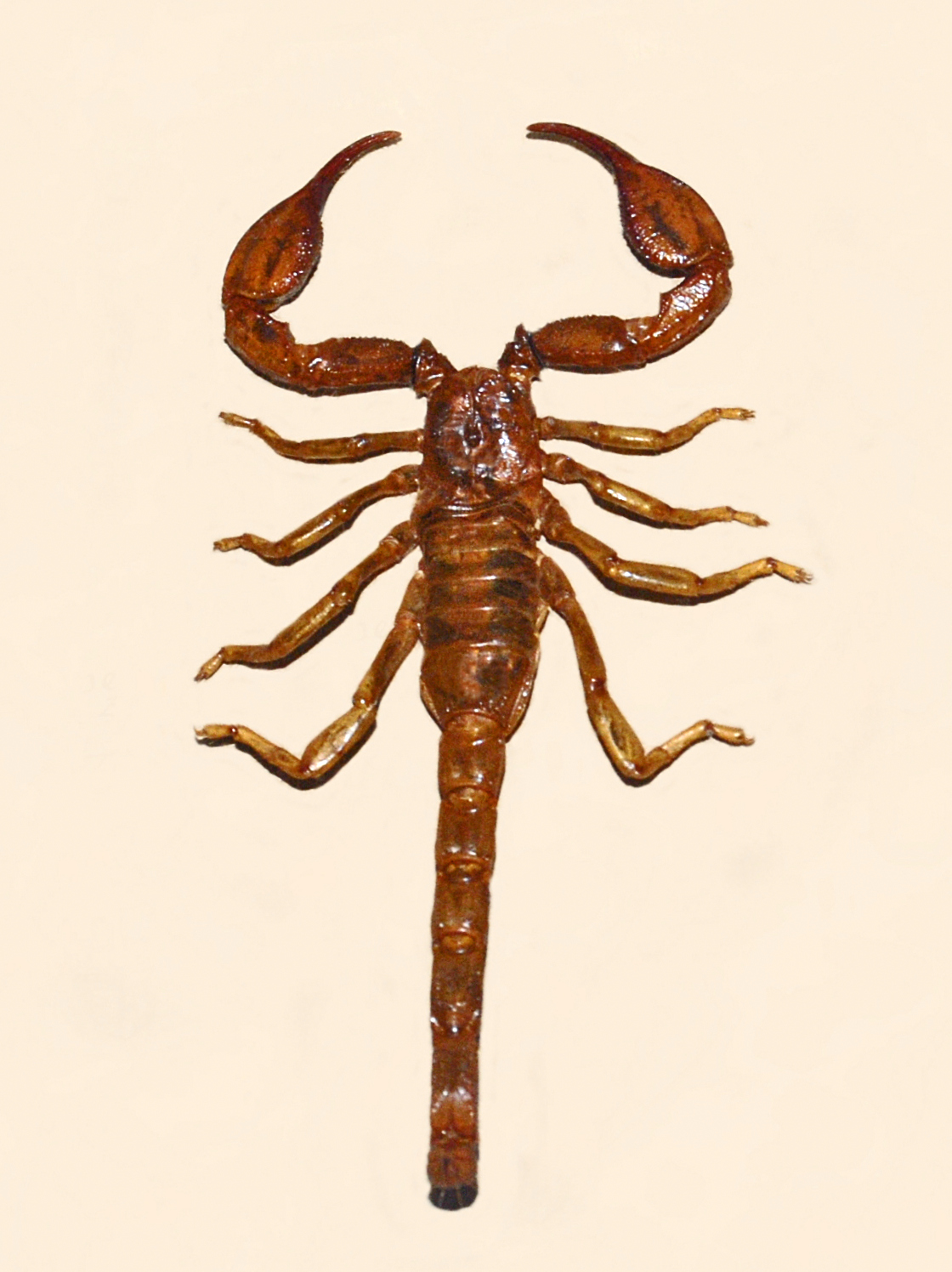
- Museum specimen of Nebo flavipes from Yemen

Scientific classification
- Kingdom: Animalia
- Phylum: Arthropoda
- Subphylum: Chelicerata
- Class: Arachnida
- Order: Scorpiones
- Family: Diplocentridae
- Genus: Nebo
- Species: N. flavipes

Binomial name
- Nebo flavipes Simon, 1882

= Nebo flavipes =

Species of scorpion

Nebo flavipes is a species of scorpions in the family Diplocentridae endemic to Yemen. .

Nebo flavipes can reach a total length of 90–100 mm (3.5–3.9 in) in females.
