= List of official city birds =

The following is an incomplete list of official city birds, organized by country.

== Bulgaria ==
- Sofia – great tit, Parus major

== Canada ==
The Bird Friendly City Certification program by Nature Canada encourages municipalities to engage local communities by having them select a city bird.

- Barrie, Ontario – belted kingfisher, Megaceryle alcyon
- Barrhead, Alberta – great blue heron, Ardea herodias
- Burlington, Ontario – trumpeter swan, Cygnus buccinator
- Calgary, Alberta – black-capped chickadee, Poecile atricapillus
- Camrose, Alberta – purple martin, Progne subis
- Chestermere, Alberta – black-billed magpie, Pica hudsonia (suggested)
- Edson, Alberta – great grey owl, Strix nebulosa
- Grande Prairie, Alberta – trumpeter swan, Cygnus buccinator
- Guelph, Ontario – black-capped chickadee, Poecile atricapillus]
- Halton Hills, Ontario – northern cardinal, Cardinalis cardinalis
- Hamilton, Ontario – peregrine falcon, Falco peregrinus
- King, Ontario – black-capped chickadee, Poecile atricapillus
- Kitchener, Ontario – dark-eyed junco, Junco hyemalis
- Lacombe, Alberta – mountain bluebird, Sialia currocoides
- London, Ontario – northern cardinal, Cardinalis cardinalis
- Marston, Quebec – common loon, Gavia immer
- Montreal, Quebec – American goldfinch, Spinus tristis
- Morinville, Alberta – ferruginous hawk, Buteo regalis
- Mulgrave-et-Derry, Quebec – cerulean warbler, Setophaga cerulea
- Olds, Alberta – great horned owl, Bubo virginianus
- Penhold, Alberta – northern harrier, Circus cyaneus
- Peterborough, Ontario – great blue heron, Ardea herodias
- Regina, Saskatchewan – black-capped chickadee, Poecile atricapillus
- Sainte-Anne-de-Bellevue, Quebec – pileated woodpecker, Dryocopus pileatus
- Saint-Gabriel-de-Valcartier, Quebec – wild turkey, Meleagris gallopavo
- Sarnia, Ontario – red-headed woodpecker, Melanerpes erythrocephalus
- Tofield, Alberta – snow goose, Anser caerulescens
- Vancouver, British Columbia – Anna's Hummingbird, Calypte anna
- Victoria, British Columbia – great blue heron, Ardea herodias (suggested)
- Windsor, Ontario – tufted titmouse, Baeolophus bicolor

== China ==
- Guangzhou, Guangdong – hwamei, Garrulax canorus
- Xiamen, Fujian – egret, Ardea and Egretta

== Ecuador ==
- Quito – black-breasted puffleg, Eriocnemis nigrivestis

== Finland ==
- Rauma – great black-backed gull, Larus marinus

== India ==
- Mumbai, India – coppersmith barbet, Megalaima haemacephala

== Japan ==
- Abiko, Chiba – Eurasian coot, Fulica atra
- Akabira, Hokkaido – varied tit, Sittiparus varius
- Aomori, Aomori – Japanese scops owl, Otus semitorques (formerly rhinoceros auklet, Cerorhinca monocerata from 1901 to 2005 )
- Chiba, Chiba – little tern, Sternula albifrons
- Chigasaki, Kanagawa – Japanese tit, Parus minor
- Chiyoda, Tokyo – mute swan, Cygnus olor
- Fuchu, Tokyo – Japanese skylark, Alauda japonica
- Fukuchi, Aomori – Japanese bush warbler, Horornis diphone
- Fukushima, Fukushima – Japanese tit, Parus minor
- Gotenba, Shizuoka – Japanese thrush, Turdus cardis
- Hachiōji, Tokyo – blue-and-white flycatcher, Cyanoptila cyanomelana
- Hadano, Kanagawa – Japanese bush warbler, Horornis diphone
- Hamamatsu, Shizuoka – barn swallow, Hirundo rustica
- Haramachi, Fukushima – Japanese skylark, Alauda japonica
- Hashikami, Aomori – Japanese bush warbler, Horornis diphone
- Himeji, Hyōgo – great egret, Ardea alba
- Hita, Oita – grey wagtail, Motacilla cinerea
- Hitachinaka, Ibaraki – Japanese bush warbler, Horornis diphone
- Hitoyoshi, Kumamoto – Japanese bush warbler, Horornis diphone
- Ichikawa, Chiba – Japanese bush warbler, Horornis diphone
- Ishioka, Ibaraki – Japanese skylark, Alauda japonica
- Itami, Hyogo – duck, Anas
- Kawagoe, Saitama – goose, Anser, Branta and Chen
- Kazuno, Akita – chicken, Gallus gallus (var. Koe Yoshi)
- Kizukuri, Aomori – lesser cuckoo, Cuculus poliocephalus
- Kōchi, Kōchi – Japanese wagtail, Motacilla grandis
- Koriyama, Fukushima – lesser cuckoo, Cuculus poliocephalus Lesser cuckoo
- Koshigaya, Saitama – Eurasian collared dove, Streptopelia decaocto
- Kumamoto, Kumamoto – Japanese tit, Parus minor
- Kurashiki, Okayama – common kingfisher, Alcedo atthis
- Mito, Ibaraki – white wagtail, Motacilla alba
- Nagaokakyo, Kyoto – Japanese white-eye, Zosterops japonicus
- Namegawa, Saitama – green pheasant, Phasianus versicolor
- Nichinan, Miyazaki – common kingfisher, Alcedo atthis
- Ota, Tokyo – Japanese bush warbler, Horornis diphone
- Oyama, Tochigi – Japanese wagtail, Motacilla grandis
- Rokkasho, Aomori – white-tailed eagle, Haliaeetus albicilla
- Sakai, Osaka – bull-headed shrike, Lanius bucephalus
- Shizuoka, Shizuoka – common kingfisher, Alcedo atthis
- Tomakomai, Hokkaido – whooper swan, Cygnus cygnus
- Tosu, Saga – Japanese white-eye, Zosterops japonicus
- Tsukuba, Ibaraki – Japanese scops owl, Otus semitorques
- Yonago, Tottori – whooper swan, Cygnus cygnus
- Zama, Kanagawa – Japanese tit, Parus minor

== Philippines ==
- Buenavista, Bohol – black-naped oriole, Oriolus chinensis (antolihaw, dimodlaw)
- Consolacion, Cebu – black shama, Copsychus cebuensis
- Jagna, Bohol – black-naped oriole, Oriolus chinensis (antolihaw, dimodlaw)
- Pandan, Antique – writhed-billed hornbill, Aceros waldeni (dulungan)
- Santiago, Agusan del Norte – writhed-billed hornbill, Aceros waldeni (kalaw)
- Tagbilaran, Bohol – Philippine tailorbird, Orthotomus castaneiceps (tamsi)

== Serbia ==
The eagle (see also Serbian eagle) is depicted in the coats of arms of Niš, Kraljevo, Leskovac, Užice, Valjevo. A dove is depicted in the coat of arms of Novi Sad.

== South Korea ==
- Asan – dove, Columba, Streptopelia
- Busan – black-tailed gull, Larus crassirostris
- Daegu – white-tailed eagle, Haliaeetus albicilla
- Gimcheon – Korean magpie, Pica serica
- Gwangju – dove, Columba, Streptopelia
- Hanam – ring-necked pheasant, Phasianus colchicus
- Miryang – Korean magpie, Pica serica
- Mokpo – red-crowned crane, Grus japonensis
- Pohang – black-tailed gull, Larus crassirostris
- Sacheon – black-tailed gull, Larus crassirostris
- Sangju – Korean magpie, Pica serica
- Seoul – Korean magpie, Pica serica
- Suncheon – black-faced spoonbill, Platalea minor

== Taiwan ==
- Keelung – Black kite, Milvus migrans formosanus
- Taichung – White-eared sibia, Heterophasia auricularis
- Taipei – Taiwan blue-magpie, Urocissa caerulea
- Hualien – Maroon oriole, Oriolus traillii ardens
- Hsinchu – Oriental magpie, Pica serica

== United States ==
- Algona, Washington – great blue heron, Ardea herodias
- Bakersfield, California – American robin ("western robin"), Turdus migratorius
- Berkeley, California – barn owl, Tyto furcata
- Cape Coral, Florida – burrowing owl, Athene cunicularia
- Chicago, Illinois – peregrine falcon, Falco peregrinus
- Deltona, Florida – Florida scrub jay, Aphelocoma coerulescens
- Dunedin, Florida – osprey, Pandion haliaetus
- Fort Worth, Texas – eastern bluebird, Sialia sialis
- Galveston, Texas – reddish egret, Egretta rufescens
- Germantown, Tennessee – eastern bluebird, Sialia sialis
- Griggsville, Illinois – purple martin, Progne subis
- Honolulu, Hawaii – White tern, Gygis alba
- Houston, Texas – yellow-crowned night heron, Nycatanassa violacea
- Huber Heights, Ohio – dove, Columbidae
- Kenmore, Washington – great blue heron, Ardea herodias
- La Plata, Maryland – purple martin, Progne subis
- Lake Forest, California – hummingbird, Trochilidae
- Madison, Wisconsin – "plastic pink flamingo"
- McAllen, Texas – green jay, Cyanocorax yncas
- Mission, Texas – Couch's kingbird, Tyrannus couchii
- Oakland, California – black-crowned night heron, Nycticorax nycticorax
- Port Aransas, Texas – roseate spoonbill, Platalea ajaja
- Portland, Oregon – great blue heron, Ardea herodias
- Redondo Beach, California – "Goodyear Blimp"
- Rockford, Illinois – peregrine falcon, Falco peregrinus
- San Francisco, California – California quail, Callipepla californica
- Santa Monica, California – brown pelican, Pelecanus occidentalis
- Seattle, Washington – great blue heron, Ardea herodias
- St. Augustine, Florida – roseate spoonbill, Platalea ajaja
- St. Petersburg, Florida – brown pelican, Pelecanus occidentalis
- Tustin, California – hooded oriole, Icterus cucullatus
- Villa Park, California – hummingbird, Calypte, Selasphorus
- Washington, D.C. – wood thrush, Hylocichla mustelina

== See also ==
- List of national birds
- List of U.S. state birds
- List of national animals
