= List of U.S. county birds =

This is a list of official birds of United States counties and county-level governments organized by state.

== California ==
- Lake County, California - great blue heron, Ardea herodias (unofficial)
- San Francisco County, California - California quail, Callipepla californica^{a}

== Maryland ==
- Howard County, Maryland - American goldfinch, Carduelis tristis
- Montgomery County, Maryland - American robin, Turdus migratorius
- Prince George's County, Maryland - eastern bluebird, Sialia sialis

== New York ==
- Nassau County, New York - osprey, Pandion haliaetus
- Westchester County, New York - blue jay, Cyanocitta cristata

== See also ==
- List of national birds
- List of U.S. state birds
- List of official city birds

== Notes ==
1.^a The city and county of San Francisco are a single government, so the city bird is a county bird.
