= List of national animals =

National animals are important symbols that represent a country's cultural identity, heritage, and natural environment. National animals are typically chosen for qualities, such as strength, courage, or resilience, and they reflect the values or historical, mythological and cultural significance of a nation. Recognition of a national animal is typically formalized through legislation or an official document by which the community or collectivity operates.

The use of national animals goes back to ancient totemism. According to Émile Durkheim, totemism involves the veneration of a totemic animal as sacred, which also serves to organize social structures within the clan. Members of the clan are believed to embody the attributes of their totemic animal. Animals are typically chosen over plants or rocks because of the natural relationship between humans and animals, especially in economic life. Some of these dynamics persist in the concept of national animals.

National animals can be determined through both bottom-up and top-down approaches, that is, can be created, imported, or inherited. The characteristics of the national animal are altered to portray the self-perception of the nation. They symbolize and uphold the ideal shared values of the country's population. The country's other national symbols, such as the coat of arms and currency, usually bear the national animal.

== National animals ==
Country	Name of animal	Scientific name (Note: commonly known as the Latin name)	Picture	Ref.
Afghanistan	Snow leopard (national animal)	Panthera uncia		
Afghanistan	Abyssinian cat (national cat)	(a breed of); Felis catus		
Albania	Golden eagle (national bird)	Aquila chrysaetos		
Algeria	Fennec fox (national animal)	Vulpes zerda		
Angola	Red-crested turaco (national bird)	Tauraco erythrolophus		
Angola	Giant sable antelope (national animal)	Hippotragus niger variani		
Antigua and Barbuda	European fallow deer (national animal)	Dama dama		
Antigua and Barbuda	Frigate (national bird)	Fregata magnificens		
Antigua and Barbuda	Hawksbill turtle (national sea creature)	Eretmochelys imbricata		
Argentina	Rufous hornero (national bird)	Furnarius rufus		
Armenia	Golden eagle (national bird)	Aquila chrysaetos		
Australia	Red kangaroo (national animal)	Macropus rufus		
Australia	Emu (national bird)	Dromaius novaehollandiae		
Austria	Austrian Bundesadler (heraldic "Federal Eagle")	Mythical		
Azerbaijan	Karabakh horse (national horse)	Equus caballus		
Bahamas	Blue marlin (national fish)	Makaira nigricans		
Bahamas	Flamingo (national bird)	Phoenicopterus ruber		
Bangladesh	Bengal tiger (national animal)	Panthera tigris tigris		
Bangladesh	Magpie robin (national bird)	Copsychus saularis		
Bangladesh	Ilish (national fish)	Tenualosa ilisha		
Belarus	European bison	Bison bonasus		
Belgium	Leo Belgicus (heraldic "Belgic lion")	Mythical		
Belize	Baird's tapir (national animal)	Tapirus bairdii		
Belize	Keel-billed toucan (national bird)	Ramphastos sulfuratus		
Bhutan	Druk (national mythical creature)	Mythical		
Bhutan	Takin (national animal)	Budorcas taxicolor		
Botswana	Plains zebra (national animal)	Equus quagga		
Brazil	Jaguar (national animal)	Panthera onca		
Brazil	Rufous-bellied thrush (national bird)	Turdus rufiventris		
Bulgaria	Lion (in Bulgarian heraldry)	Panthera leo		
Cambodia	Kouprey (national mammal)	Bos sauveli		
Cambodia	Giant ibis (national bird)	Pseudibis gigantea		
Cambodia	Northern river terrapin (national reptile)	Batagur baska		
Cambodia	Giant barb (national fish)	Catlocarpio siamensis		
Canada	North American beaver (national animal)	Castor canadensis		
Canada	Canadian horse (national horse)	Equus ferus caballus		
Chile	South Andean deer (national animal)	Hippocamelus bisulcus		
China	Chinese dragon (national mythical creature)	Mythical		
China	Giant panda (national animal)	Ailuropoda melanoleuca		
China	Red-crowned crane (national bird)	Grus japonensis		
Democratic Republic of the Congo	Okapi (national animal)	Okapia johnstoni		
Colombia	Andean condor (national bird)	Vultur gryphus		
Costa Rica	Yigüirro (national bird)	Turdus grayi		
Costa Rica	White-tailed deer (national animal)	Odocoileus virginianus		
Costa Rica	West Indian manatee (national aquatic animal)	Trichechus manatus		
Costa Rica	Two-toed sloth (national animal)	Choloepus hoffmanni		
Costa Rica	Three-toed sloth (national animal)	Bradypus variegatus		
Croatia	Pine marten (national animal)	Martes martes		
Cuba	Cuban trogon (national bird)	Priotelus temnurus		
Cyprus	Cypriot mouflon (national animal)	Ovis orientalis		
Czech Republic	Double-tailed lion	Mythical		
Denmark	Red squirrel (national mammal)	Sciurus vulgaris		
Denmark	Mute swan (national bird)	Cygnus olor		
Denmark	Small tortoiseshell (national butterfly)	Aglais urticae		
Dominica	Sisserou parrot (national bird)	Amazona imperalis		
Egypt	Steppe eagle (national bird)	Aquila nipalensis		
Eritrea	Arabian camel (national animal)	Camelus dromedarius		
Ethiopia	Lion (national animal)	Panthera leo		
Estonia	Wolf (national animal)	Canis lupus	Loup_gris_(Canis_lupus_)	
Estonia	Barn swallow (national bird)	Hirundo rustica	Barn_swallow_in_Montezuma_(150)	
Estonia	Baltic herring (national fish)	Clupea harengus membras	Silakka	
Estonia	Swallowtail (national butterfly)	Papilio machaon	Papilio_machaon_Mitterbach_01	
Finland	Brown bear (national animal)	Ursus arctos		
Finland	Whooper swan (national bird)	Cygnus cygnus		
Finland	European perch (national fish)	Perca fluviatilis		
Finland	Seven-spot ladybird (national insect)	Coccinella septempunctata		
France	Gallic rooster (national bird)	Gallus gallus domesticus		
Gabon	Black panther (national animal)	Panthera pardus		
Gambia	Spotted hyena (national animal)	Crocuta crocuta		
Germany	Bundesadler (heraldic "Federal Eagle")	Mythical		
Greece	Phoenix (national bird)	Mythical		
Greece	Dolphin (national animal)	Delphinidae		
Grenada	Grenada dove (national bird)	Leptotila wellsi		
Guatemala	Resplendent quetzal (national bird)	Pharomachrus mocinno		
Guyana	Jaguar (national animal)	Panthera onca		
Haiti	Hispaniolan trogon (national bird)	Priotelus roseigaster		
Honduras	White-tailed deer (national animal)	Odocoileus virginianus		
Honduras	Scarlet macaw (national bird)	Ara macao		
Hungary	Turul (national mythical creature)	Mythical (most probably Falco cherrug)		
Iceland	Gyrfalcon (national bird)	Falco rusticolus		
India	Bengal tiger (national animal)	Panthera tigris tigris		
India	Indian peafowl (national bird)	Pavo cristatus		
India	Ganges river dolphin (national aquatic animal)	Platanista gangetica		
India	Indian elephant (national heritage animal)	Elephas maximus indicus		
Indonesia	Komodo dragon (national animal)	Varanus komodoensis		
Indonesia	Javan hawk-eagle (national bird)	Nisaetus bartelsi		
Indonesia	Asian arowana (national fish)	Scleropages formosus		
Iran	Asiatic lion (national animal)	Panthera leo persica		
Iran	Persian Leopard (national animal)	Panthera pardus saxicolor		
Iraq	Chukar partridge (National bird)	Alectoris chukar		
Iraq	Goat (National animal, KRG)	Capra aegagrus		
Ireland	Irish hare	Lepus timidus hibernicus		
Israel	Lion of Judah (heraldic symbol)	Panthera leo		
Israel	Eurasian hoopoe (national bird)	Upupa epops		
Israel	Palestine viper (national snake)	Daboia palaestinae		
Israel	Canaan Dog (national dog breed)	Canis familiaris		
Israel	Common black scorpion (national scorpion)	Nebo hierichonticus		
Israel	Mountain gazelle (national animal)	Gazella gazella		
Italy	Italian wolf (national animal)	Canis lupus italicus		
Jamaica	Red-billed streamertail (national bird)	Trochilus polytmus		
Japan	Green pheasant (national bird)	Phasianus versicolor		
Japan	Koi (national fish)	Cyprinus carpio		
Kenya	Lion (national animal)	Panthera leo		
Laos	Asian elephant (national animal)	Elephas maximus		
Latvia	White wagtail (national bird)	Motacilla alba		
Latvia	Two-spotted ladybug (national insect)	Adalia bipunctata		
Lebanon	Striped hyena (national animal)	Hyaena hyaena		
Lithuania	White stork (national bird)	Ciconia ciconia		
Madagascar	Zebu (in Malagasy heraldry)	Bos primigenius indicus		
Madagascar	Ring-tailed lemur (national animal)	Lemur catta		
Malaysia	Malayan tiger (national animal)	Panthera tigris		
Malta	Pharaoh Hound (national dog breed)	Canis lupus familiaris		
Mauritius	Dodo (national bird and animal)	Raphus cucullatus		
Mexico	Golden eagle (national bird and animal)	Aquila chrysaetos		
Mexico	Xoloitzcuintli (national dog breed)	(a breed of); Canis lupus familiaris		
Mexico	Jaguar (national mammal)	Panthera onca		
Mexico	Grasshopper (national arthropod )	Sphenarium purpurascens		
Mexico	Vaquita (national marine mammal)	Phocoena sinus		
Moldova	Aurochs (national animal)	Bos primigenius		
Monaco	European hedgehog (national animal)	Erinaceus europaeus		
Monaco	European rabbit (national animal)	Oryctolagus cuniculus		
Monaco	Wood mouse (national animal)	Apodemus sylvaticus		
Mongolia	Przewalski's horse (national animal)	Equus ferus przewalskii		
Mongolia	Saker falcon (national bird)	Falco cherrug		
Mongolia	Gobi bear (national pride animal)	Ursus arctos gobiensis		
Morocco	Barbary lion (national animal)	Panthera leo leo		
Nepal	Cow (national animal)	Bos indicus		
Nepal	Himalayan monal (national bird)	Lophophorus impejanus		
Netherlands	Lion (heraldic symbol)	Panthera leo		
Netherlands	Black-tailed godwit (national bird)	Limosa limosa		
New Zealand	Kiwi (national bird)	Apteryx sp.		
Nicaragua	Turquoise-browed motmot (national bird)	Eumomota superciliosa		
Nigeria	Eagle	Accipitridae		
Nigeria	Black crowned crane (national bird)	Balearica pavonina		
North Korea	Qianlima (national animal)	Mythical		
North Korea	Siberian tiger (national animal)	Panthera tigris altaica		
North Korea	Pungsan dog (national dog)	Canis familiaris		
North Korea	Korean magpie (national bird)	Pica serica		
Norway	Eurasian elk/moose (national animal)	Alces alces		
Norway	Lion (royal national animal)	Panthera leo		
Norway	White-throated dipper (national bird)	Cinclus cinclus		
Norway	Fjord horse (national horse)	Equus ferus caballus		
Pakistan	Markhor (national animal)	Capra falconeri		
Pakistan	Indus river dolphin (national aquatic mammal)	Platanista minor		
Pakistan	Chukar (national bird)	Alectoris chukar		
Pakistan	Mugger crocodile (national reptile)	Crocodylus palustris		
Pakistan	Shaheen falcon (heritage bird)	Falco peregrinus peregrinator		
Pakistan	Snow leopard (national predator)	Panthera uncia		
Panama	Harpy eagle (national bird)	Harpia harpyja		
Panama	Panamanian golden frog (national animal)	Atelopus zeteki		
Papua New Guinea	Dugong (national marine mammal)	Dugong dugon		
Peru	Vicuña (national animal)	Vicugna vicugna		
Peru	Andean cock-of-the-rock (national bird)	Rupicola peruviana		
Philippines	Carabao (national animal)	Bubalus bubalis		
Philippines	Philippine eagle (national bird)	Pithecophaga jefferyi		
Poland	White-tailed eagle (national bird)	Haliaeetus albicilla		
Poland	White stork (national bird)	Ciconia ciconia		
Poland	European bison (national animal)	Bison bonasus		
Portugal	Dragon (traditional coat of arms / national animal)	Mythical		
Portugal	Cock of Barcelos (national bird)	Mythical	sans cadre	
Portugal	Iberian Wolf (national animal)	Canis lupus signatus		
Qatar	Arabian oryx (national animal)	Oryx leucoryx		
Romania	Eurasian Lynx	Lynx lynx		
Russia	Brown bear (national animal)	Ursus arctos		
Russia	Double-headed eagle (traditional coat of arms)	Mythical		
Rwanda	Leopard	Panthera pardus		
Saint Kitts and Nevis	Brown pelican (national bird)	Pelecanus occidentalis		
Saint Lucia	Saint Lucia amazon (national bird)	Amazona versicolor		
Saint Vincent and the Grenadines	Saint Vincent amazon (national bird)	Amazona guildingii		
Saudi Arabia	Arabian camel (national animal)	Camelus dromedarius		
Serbia	Wolf (national animal)	Canis lupus lupus		
Serbia	White eagle (traditional coat of arms)	Mythical		
Sierra Leone	Chimpanzee (national animal)	Pan troglodytes		
Singapore	Lion (national animal)	Panthera leo		
Somalia	Leopard (national animal)	Panthera pardus		
South Africa	Springbok (national animal)	Antidorcas marsupialis		
South Africa	Blue crane (national bird)	Anthropoides paradiseus		
South Africa	Galjoen (national fish)	Dichistius capensis		
South Korea	Siberian tiger (national animal)	Panthera tigris altaica		
South Korea	Korean magpie (national bird)	Pica serica		
South Sudan	African fish eagle (national bird)	Haliaeetus vocifer		
Spain	Bull (national animal)	Bos taurus		
Sri Lanka	Grizzled giant squirrel (national animal)	Ratufa macroura		
Sri Lanka	Sri Lankan junglefowl (national bird)	Gallus lafayettii		
Sudan	Secretarybird (national bird)	Sagittarius serpentarius		
Sweden	Eurasian elk/moose (national animal)	Alces alces		
Sweden	Eurasian blackbird (national bird)	Turdus merula		
Switzerland	Cow (national animal)	Bos taurus		
Taiwan	Formosan black bear (national animal)	Ursus thibetanus formosanus		
Tanzania	Giraffe (national animal)	Giraffa sp.		
Thailand	Asian elephant (national animal)	Elephas maximus		
Thailand	Siamese fighting fish (national aquatic animal)	Betta splendens		
Togo	Lion	Panthera leo		
Turkey	Gray wolf (national animal)	Canis lupus		
Turkey	Kangal Shepherd Dog (national dog)	Canis lupus familiaris		
Turkey	Turkish Angora (national cat)	Felis catus		
Uganda	Grey crowned crane (national bird)	Balearica regulorum		
Uganda	Ugandan kob (national animal)	Kobus kob thomasi		
United Arab Emirates	Saker falcon (national bird)	Falco cherrug		
United Arab Emirates	Arabian oryx (national animal)	Oryx leucoryx		
United Kingdom	Bulldog (Britain as "British Bulldog")	Canis lupus familiaris		
United Kingdom	Lion (England)	Panthera leo		
United Kingdom	Red kite (Wales)	Milvus milvus		
United Kingdom	Unicorn (Scotland)	Mythical		
United Kingdom	Y Ddraig Goch (The Red Dragon of Wales)	Mythical		
United States	Bald eagle (national bird)	Haliaeetus leucocephalus		
United States	American bison (national mammal)	Bison bison		
Venezuela	Venezuelan troupial (national bird)	Icterus icterus		
Vietnam	Water buffalo (national animal)	Bubalus bubalis		
Zimbabwe	Sable antelope (national animal)	Hippotragus niger		
Zimbabwe	African fish eagle (national bird)	Haliaeetus vocifer		

== See also ==
- List of animals representing first-level administrative country subdivisions
- List of national birds
- Animals as heraldic charges
- List of national flowers
- National personification
