= List of national birds =

This is a list of national birds, including official birds of overseas territories and other states described as nations. Most species in the list are officially designated. Some species hold only an "unofficial" status. The Official status column is marked as Yes only if the bird currently holds the position of the official national bird. Additionally, the list includes birds that were once official but are no longer, as well as birds accepted as national symbols or for other symbolic roles.

== National birds ==
Country	Name of bird	Scientific name	Official status	Picture	Ref.
Afghanistan	Golden eagle	Aquila chrysaetos	Yes		
Albania	Golden eagle	Aquila chrysaetos	Yes		
Angola	Red-crested turaco	Tauraco erythrolophus	Yes		
Anguilla	Zenaida dove	Zenaida aurita	Yes		
Antigua and Barbuda	Magnificent frigatebird	Fregata magnificens	Yes		
Argentina	Rufous hornero	Furnarius rufus	Yes		
Aruba	Prikichi or brown-throated parakeet established 2017	Eupsittula pertinax arubensis	Yes		
Aruba	Shoco or burrowing owl established 2012	Athene cunicularia arubensis	No		
Australia	Emu	Dromaius novaehollandiae	No		
Austria	Eagle	unspecified	No		
Austria	Great egret	Ardea alba	No		
Bahamas	American flamingo	Phoenicopterus ruber	Yes		
Bahrain	White-eared bulbul	Pycnonotus leucotis	Yes		
Bangladesh	Doyel pakhi or oriental magpie-robin	Copsychus saularis	Yes		
Belarus	White stork	Ciconia ciconia	No		
Belgium	Common kestrel	Falco tinnunculus	Yes		
Belize	Keel-billed toucan	Ramphastos sulfuratus	Yes		
Bermuda	Bermuda petrel	Pterodroma cahow	No		
Bhutan	Common raven	Corvus corax	Yes		
Bolivia	Andean condor	Vultur gryphus	Yes		
Botswana	Kori bustard	Ardeotis kori	Yes		
Brazil	Rufous-bellied thrush	Turdus rufiventris	Yes		
British Virgin Islands	Mourning dove	Zenaida macroura	Yes		
Cambodia	Giant ibis	Pseudibis gigantea	Yes		
Canada	Canada jay. Selected as national bird by the Royal Canadian Geographical Society through an expert panel and Canadian Geographic magazine reader poll. The Canadian government does not recognize the designation.	Perisoreus canadensis	No		
Cayman Islands	Grand Cayman parrot	Amazona leucocephala caymanensis	Yes		
Chile	Andean condor	Vultur gryphus	Yes		
China	Red-crowned crane. Proposed as national bird by State Forestry Administration in 2007 (awaiting State Council approval).	Grus japonensis	No		
Colombia	Andean condor	Vultur gryphus	Yes		
Costa Rica	Clay-colored thrush	Turdus grayi	Yes		
Croatia	Common nightingale	Luscinia megarhynchos	No		
Cuba	Cuban trogon	Priotelus temnurus	Yes		
Czech Republic	Common kingfisher	Alcedo atthis	No		
Denmark	Mute swan established 1984	Cygnus olor	Yes		
Denmark	Eurasian skylark 1960–1984	Alauda arvensis	No		
Dominica	Imperial amazon	Amazona imperialis	Yes		
Dominican Republic	Palmchat	Dulus dominicus	Yes		
Ecuador	Andean condor	Vultur gryphus	Yes		
Egypt	Steppe eagle	Aquila nipalensis	Yes		
El Salvador	Turquoise-browed motmot	Eumomota superciliosa	Yes		
Eritrea	White-cheeked turaco	Tauraco leucotis	Yes		
Estonia	Barn swallow	Hirundo rustica	Yes		
Eswatini	Purple-crested turaco	Tauraco porphyreolophus	Yes		
Faroe Islands	Eurasian oystercatcher	Haematopus ostralegus	Yes		
Finland	Whooper swan	Cygnus cygnus	No		
France	Gallic rooster	Gallus gallus	No		
Georgia	Common kestrel	Falco tinnunculus	No		
Germany	Golden eagle	Aquila chrysaetos	No		
Gibraltar	Barbary partridge	Alectoris barbara	Yes		
Grenada	Grenada dove	Leptotila wellsi	Yes		
Guatemala	Resplendent quetzal	Pharomachrus mocinno	Yes		
Guyana	Hoatzin	Opisthocomus hoazin	Yes		
Haiti	Hispaniolan trogon	Priotelus roseigaster	Yes		
Honduras	Scarlet macaw	Ara macao	Yes		
Hungary	Saker falcon	Falco cherrug	Yes		
Iceland	Gyrfalcon	Falco rusticolus	Yes		
India	Indian peacock	Pavo cristatus	Yes		
Indonesia	Javan hawk-eagle	Nisaetus bartelsi	Yes		
Iran	Common nightingale	Luscinia megarhynchos	Yes		
Ireland	Northern lapwing	Vanellus vanellus	No		
Israel	Eurasian hoopoe	Upupa epops	Yes		
Italy	Italian sparrow	Passer italiae	No		
Jamaica	Doctor bird or red-billed streamertail	Trochilus polytmus	Yes		
Japan	Green pheasant	Phasianus versicolor	Yes		
Jordan	Sinai rosefinch	Carpodacus synoicus	Yes		
Kazakhstan	Steppe eagle	Aquila nipalensis	Yes		
Kenya	Lilac-breasted roller	Coracias caudatus	No		
Latvia	White wagtail	Motacilla alba	Yes		
Liberia	Common bulbul	Pycnonotus barbatus	Yes		
Lithuania	White stork	Ciconia ciconia	Yes		
Luxembourg	Goldcrest	Regulus regulus	Yes		
Malawi	African fish eagle	Icthyophaga vocifer	Yes		
Malaysia	Rhinoceros hornbill	Buceros rhinoceros	Yes		
Malta	Blue rock thrush	Monticola solitarius	Yes		
Mauritius	Mauritius kestrel	Falco punctatus	Yes		
Mexico	Golden eagle	Aquila chrysaetos	Yes		
Mongolia	Saker falcon	Falco cherrug	Yes		
Montserrat	Montserrat oriole	Icterus oberi	Yes		
Morocco	Moussier's redstart	Phoenicurus moussieri	No		
Myanmar	Grey peacock-pheasant	Polyplectron bicalcaratum	No		
Namibia	African fish eagle	Icthyophaga vocifer	Yes		
Nepal	Himalayan monal	Lophophorus impejanus	Yes		
Netherlands	Black-tailed godwit	Limosa limosa	Yes		
New Zealand	North Island brown kiwi	Apteryx mantelli	No		
Nicaragua	Turquoise-browed motmot	Eumomota superciliosa	Yes		
Nigeria	Black crowned crane	Balearica pavonina	Yes		
Northern Ireland	Eurasian oystercatcher	Haematopus ostralegus	No		
North Korea	Korean magpie	Pica serica	Yes		
Norway	White-throated dipper	Cinclus cinclus	Yes		
Pakistan	Chukar partridge	Alectoris chukar	Yes		
Pakistan	Shaheen falcon heritage bird	Falco peregrinus peregrinator	No		
Palau	Palau fruit dove	Ptilinopus pelewensis	Yes		
Palestine	Palestine sunbird	Cinnyris oseus	Yes		
Panama	Harpy eagle	Harpia harpyja	Yes		
Peru	Andean cock-of-the-rock	Rupicola peruviana	Yes		
Papua New Guinea	Raggiana bird-of-paradise	Paradisaea raggiana	Yes		
Paraguay	Bare-throated bellbird	Procnias nudicollis	Yes		
Philippines	Philippine eagle	Pithecophaga jefferyi	Yes		
Poland	White-tailed eagle	Haliaeetus albicilla	Yes		
Poland	White stork	Ciconia ciconia	No		
Puerto Rico	Puerto Rican spindalis	Spindalis portoricensis	No		
Romania	Golden eagle	Aquila chrysaetos	Yes		
Romania	Great white pelican	Pelecanus onocrotalus	No		
Rwanda	Grey crowned crane	Balearica regulorum	Yes		
Saint Helena	Saint Helena plover	Charadrius sanctaehelenae	Yes		
Saint Kitts and Nevis	Brown pelican	Pelecanus occidentalis	Yes		
Saint Lucia	Saint Lucia amazon	Amazona versicolor	Yes		
Saint Vincent and the Grenadines	St Vincent parrot	Amazona guildingii	Yes		
Samoa	Tooth-billed pigeon	Didunculus strigirostris	Yes		
Scotland	Golden eagle	Aquila chrysaetos	No		
Serbia	Eastern imperial eagle	Aquila heliaca	Yes		
Seychelles	Seychelles black parrot	Coracopsis barklyi	Yes		
Singapore	Crimson sunbird	Aethopyga siparaja	No		
South Africa	Blue crane	Grus paradisea	Yes		
South Korea	Korean magpie	Pica serica	No		
Sri Lanka	Sri Lanka junglefowl	Gallus lafayetii	Yes		
Sweden	Common blackbird	Turdus merula	No		
Taiwan	Taiwan blue magpie	Urocissa caerulea	No		
Tajikistan	Golden eagle	Aquila chrysaetos	Yes		
Thailand	Siamese fireback	Lophura diardi	Yes		
Trinidad and Tobago	Scarlet ibis (Trinidad)	Eudocimus ruber	Yes		
Trinidad and Tobago	Cocrico (Tobago)	Ortalis ruficauda	Yes		
Turkmenistan	Black francolin	Francolinus francolinus	Yes		
Uganda	East African crowned crane	Balearica regulorum gibbericeps	Yes		
Ukraine	White stork	Ciconia ciconia	No		
United Arab Emirates	Saker falcon	Falco cherrug	Yes		
United Kingdom	European robin	Erithacus rubecula	No		
United States	Bald eagle	Haliaeetus leucocephalus	Yes		
Uruguay	Southern lapwing	Vanellus chilensis	No		
Uzbekistan	Huma bird	Mythical creature	Yes		
Venezuela	Venezuelan troupial	Icterus icterus	Yes		
Wales	Red kite	Milvus milvus	No		
Yemen	Arabian grosbeak	Rhynchostruthus percivali	Yes		
Zambia	African fish eagle	Icthyophaga vocifer	Yes		
Zimbabwe	African fish eagle	Icthyophaga vocifer	Yes		

== See also ==
- List of Australian bird emblems
- List of Indian state birds
- List of U.S. state birds
- List of U.S. county birds
- List of official city birds
- List of national animals
