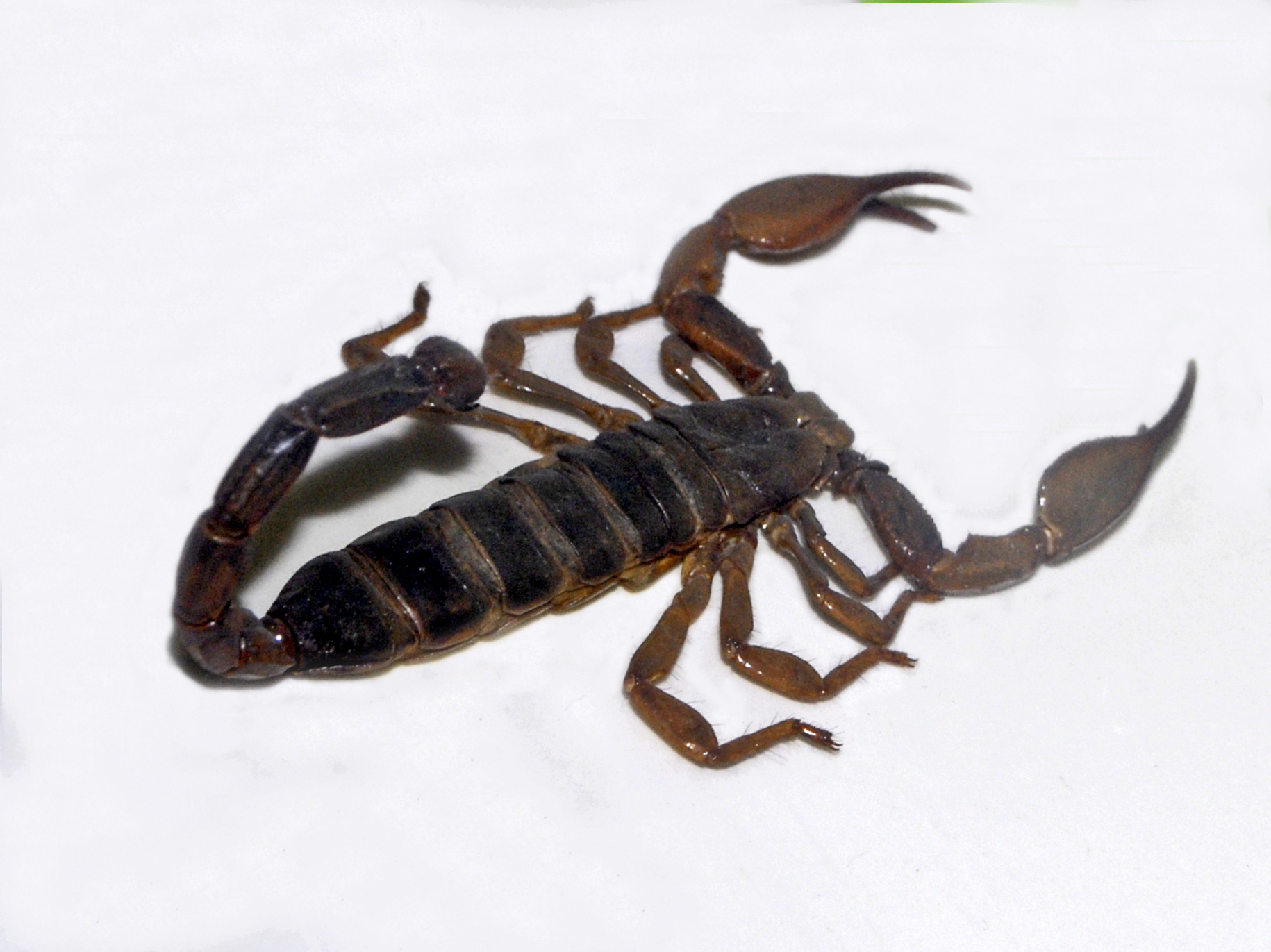
- Museum specimen of Nebo hierichonticus from Israel

Scientific classification
- Domain: Eukaryota
- Kingdom: Animalia
- Phylum: Arthropoda
- Subphylum: Chelicerata
- Class: Arachnida
- Order: Scorpiones
- Family: Diplocentridae
- Subfamily: Nebinae
- Genus: Nebo; Simon, 1878

= Nebo (scorpion) =

Genus of scorpions

Nebo is a genus of scorpions in the family Diplocentridae.

== Species ==
- Nebo flavipes Simon, 1882
- Nebo franckei Vachon, 1980
- Nebo grandis Francke, 1980
- Nebo henjamicus Francke, 1980
- Nebo hierichonticus (Simon, 1872)
- Nebo omanensis Francke, 1980
- Nebo poggesii Sissom, 1994
- Nebo whitei Vachon, 1980
- Nebo yemenensis Francke, 1980
