= Kolotl =

Scientific classification
- Domain: Eukaryota
- Kingdom: Animalia
- Phylum: Arthropoda
- Subphylum: Chelicerata
- Class: Arachnida
- Order: Scorpiones
- Family: Diplocentridae
- Genus: Kolotl; Santibáñez-López, Francke & Prendini, 2014

Species
- See text

Genus of Diplocentridae scorpions

Kolotl is a genus of scorpions in the family Diplocentridae, native to Mexico. Named for the Nahuatl word for scorpion, they can be almost 10 cm long.

== Species ==
Currently accepted species include:

- Kolotl magnus (Beutelspacher & López-Forment, 1991)
- Kolotl poncei (Francke & Quijano-Ravell, 2009)
