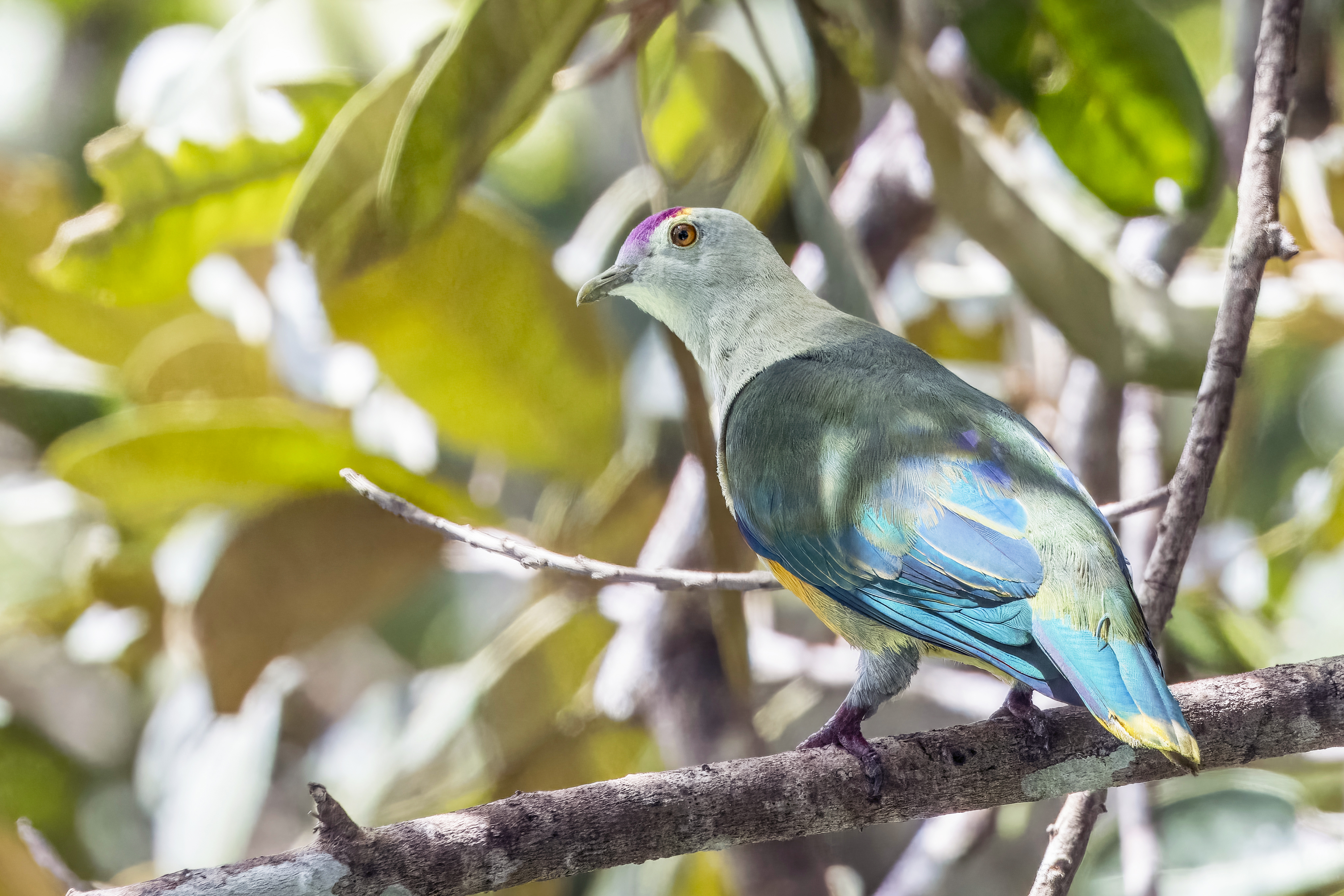

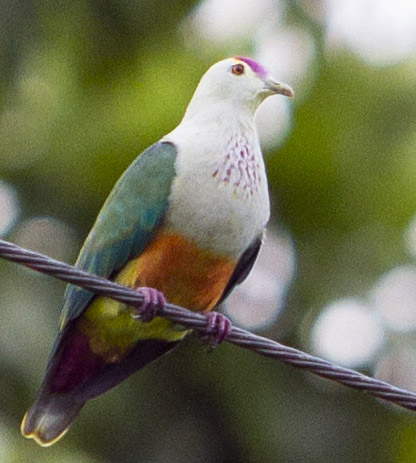

Conservation status
- Least Concern (IUCN 3.1)

Scientific classification
- Kingdom: Animalia
- Phylum: Chordata
- Class: Aves
- Order: Columbiformes
- Family: Columbidae
- Genus: Ptilinopus
- Species: P. pelewensis

Binomial name
- Ptilinopus pelewensis Hartlaub & Finsch, 1868

= Palau fruit dove =

Species of bird

The Palau fruit dove (Ptilinopus pelewensis) is a species of bird in the dove family Columbidae. It is endemic to Palau and it is also the country's national bird.

== Description ==
The Palau fruit dove is 23 to 25 cm (9.1–9.8 in) long and weighs around 93 g (3.3 oz). The species has a grey head, neck and breast with a purple cap and yellow line. There is an orange band across the lower breast and belly and olive-green back, wings and tail. Both sexes are alike. Juvenile birds resemble the adults but lack the purple cap, the green upperparts are lined with yellow and the belly is yellow.

== Distribution and habitat ==
The Palau fruit dove is endemic to Palau, where it is common in all habitats across the island. The species declined due to hunting prior to 1945, but has rebounded with protection and is now common.

They play a role in recovering savanna ecosystems, such as forests that were clear-cut.
