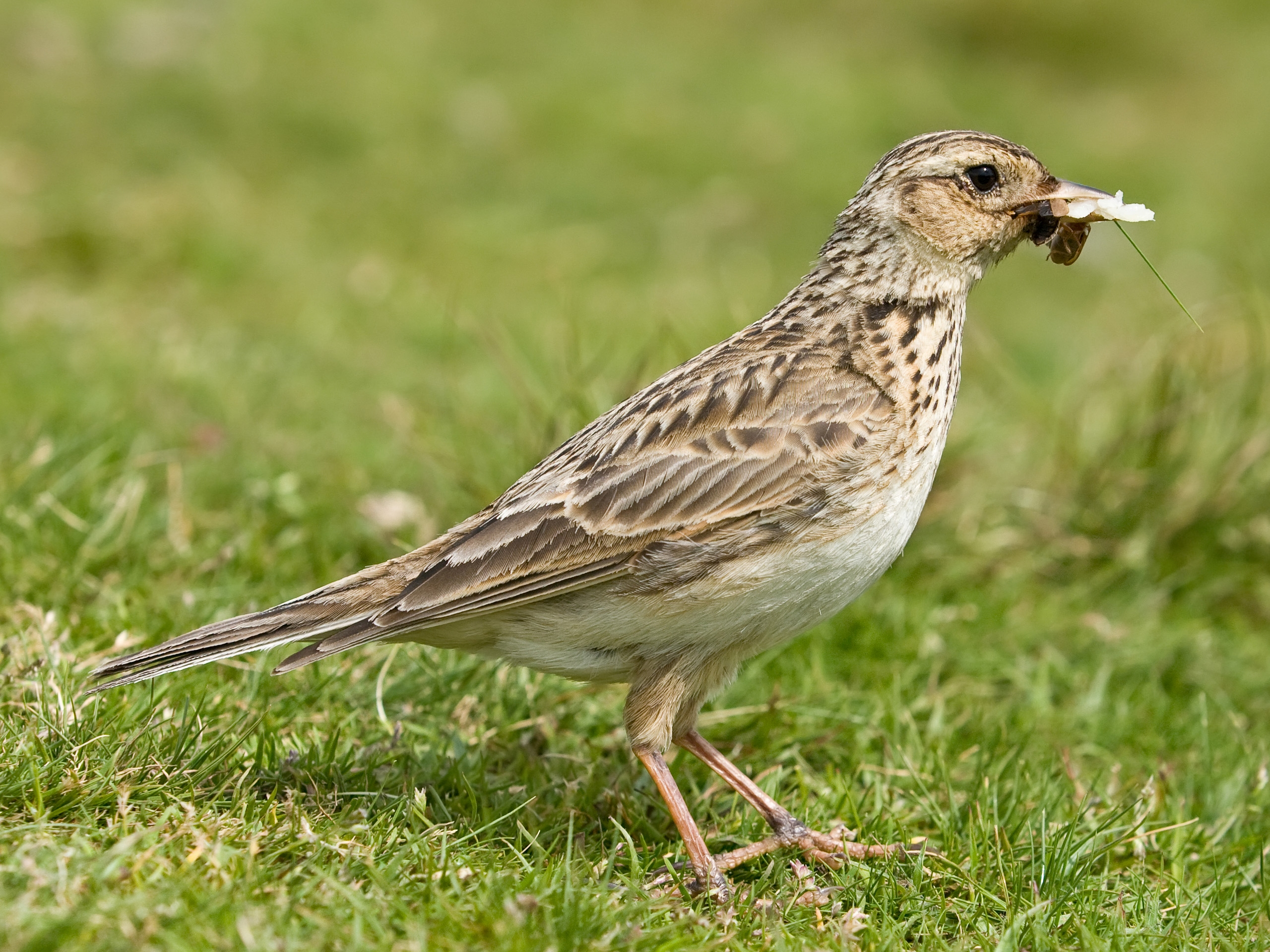
- With insect caught in beak

Conservation status
- Least Concern (IUCN 3.1)

Scientific classification
- Kingdom: Animalia
- Phylum: Chordata
- Class: Aves
- Order: Passeriformes
- Family: Alaudidae
- Genus: Alauda
- Species: A. arvensis

Binomial name
- Alauda arvensis Linnaeus, 1758

Subspecies
- See text
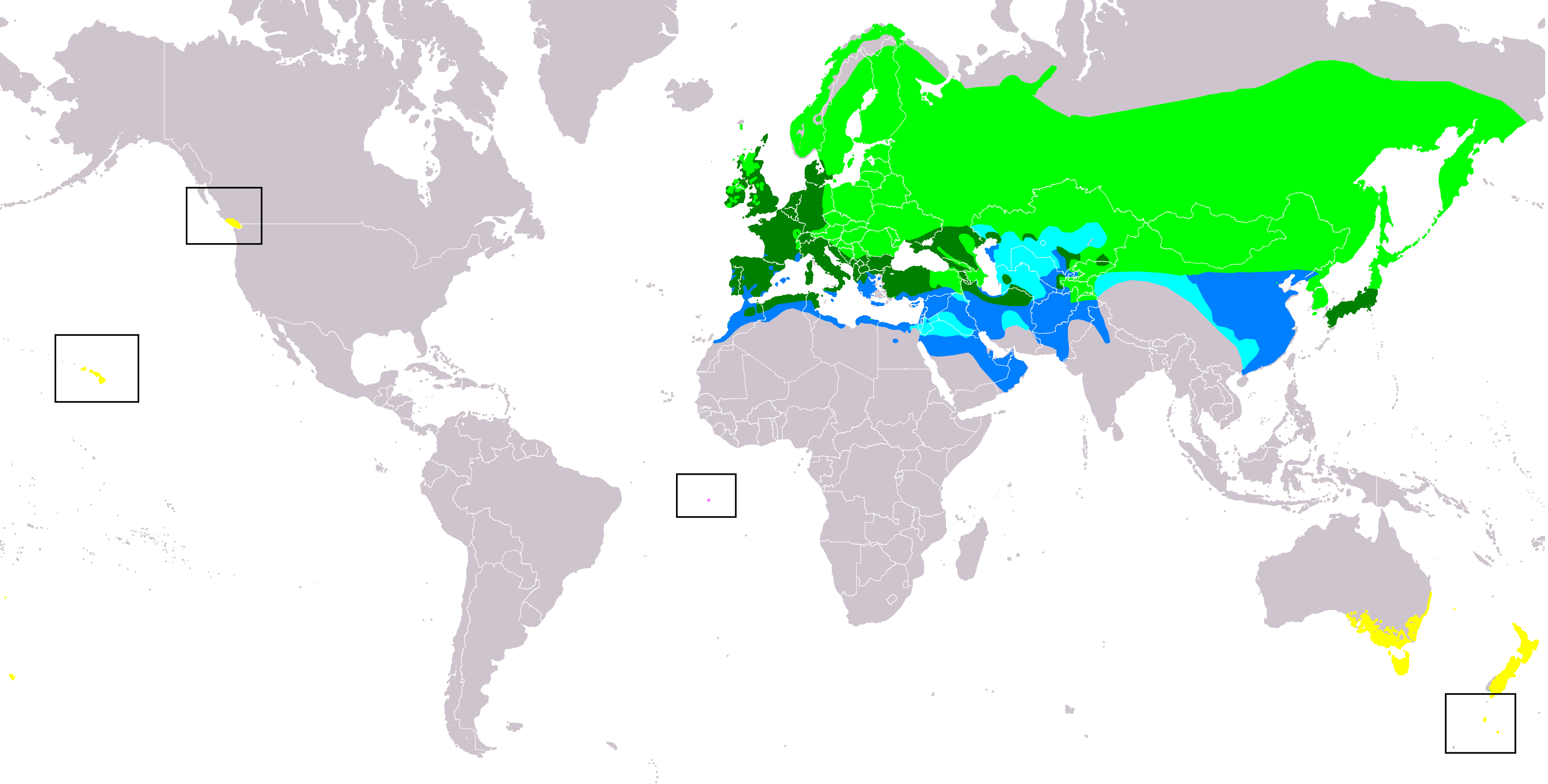
- Range of A. arvensis Breeding Resident Passage Non-breeding Extant and introduced (resident) Possibly extinct and introduced

Audio
- Song recorded in Wales

= Eurasian skylark =

Species of bird

The Eurasian skylark (Alauda arvensis), commonly referred to in Europe as the lark, is a passerine bird in the lark family, Alaudidae. It is a widespread species found across Europe and the Palearctic with introduced populations in Australia, New Zealand, Canada, and on the Hawaiian Islands. It is a bird of open farmland and heath, known for the song of the male, which is delivered in hovering flight from heights of 50 to 100 metres (160 to 330 ft). The sexes are alike. It is streaked greyish-brown above and on the breast and has a buff-white belly.

The female Eurasian skylark builds an open nest in a shallow depression on open ground well away from trees, bushes and hedges. She lays three to five eggs which she incubates for around 11 days. The chicks are fed by both parents but leave the nest after eight to ten days, well before they can fly. They scatter and hide in the vegetation but continue to be fed by the parents until they can fly at 18 to 20 days of age. Nests are subject to high predation rates by larger birds and small mammals. The parents can have several broods in a single season.

== Taxonomy and systematics ==
The Eurasian skylark was described by the Swedish naturalist Carl Linnaeus in 1758 in the tenth edition of his Systema Naturae and retains its original binomial name of Alauda arvensis. It is one of the four species placed in the genus Alauda. The genus name is from the Latin alauda, "lark". Pliny thought the word was originally of Celtic origin. The specific arvensis is also Latin, and means "of the field". The results of a molecular phylogenetic study of the lark family Alaudidae published in 2013 suggested that Eurasian skylark is most closely related to the Oriental skylark Alauda gulgula.

Formerly, many authorities considered the Japanese skylark as a separate species. It is now usually considered a subspecies of the Eurasian skylark. Alternate names for the Eurasian skylark include northern skylark and sky lark.

=== Subspecies ===
Eleven subspecies are recognized:

- A. a. arvensis Linnaeus, 1758 – northern, western and central Europe
- A. a. sierrae Weigold, 1913 – Portugal, central and southern Spain
- A. a. harterti Whitaker, 1904 – north-western Africa
- A. a. cantarella Bonaparte, 1850 – southern Europe from north-eastern Spain to Turkey and the Caucasus
- A. a. armenica Bogdanov, 1879 – south-eastern Turkey to Iran
- A. a. dulcivox Hume, 1872 – south-eastern European Russia and western Siberia to north-western China and south-western Mongolia
- A. a. kiborti Zaliesski, 1917 – southern Siberia, northern and eastern Mongolia and north-eastern China
- A. a. intermedia R. Swinhoe, 1863 – north-central Siberia to north-eastern China and Korea
- A. a. pekinensis Swinhoe, 1863 – north-eastern Siberia, Kamchatka Peninsula and the Kuril Islands
- A. a. lonnbergi Hachisuka, 1926 – northern Sakhalin Island
- A. a. japonica Temminck & Schlegel, 1848 – southern Sakhalin Island, southern Kuril Island, Japan and the Ryukyu Islands: the Japanese skylark

Some authorities recognise the subspecies A. a. scotia Tschusi, 1903 and A. a. guillelmi Witherby, 1921. In the above list scotia is included in the nominate subspecies A. a. arvensis and guillelmi is included in A. a. sierrae.

== Description ==
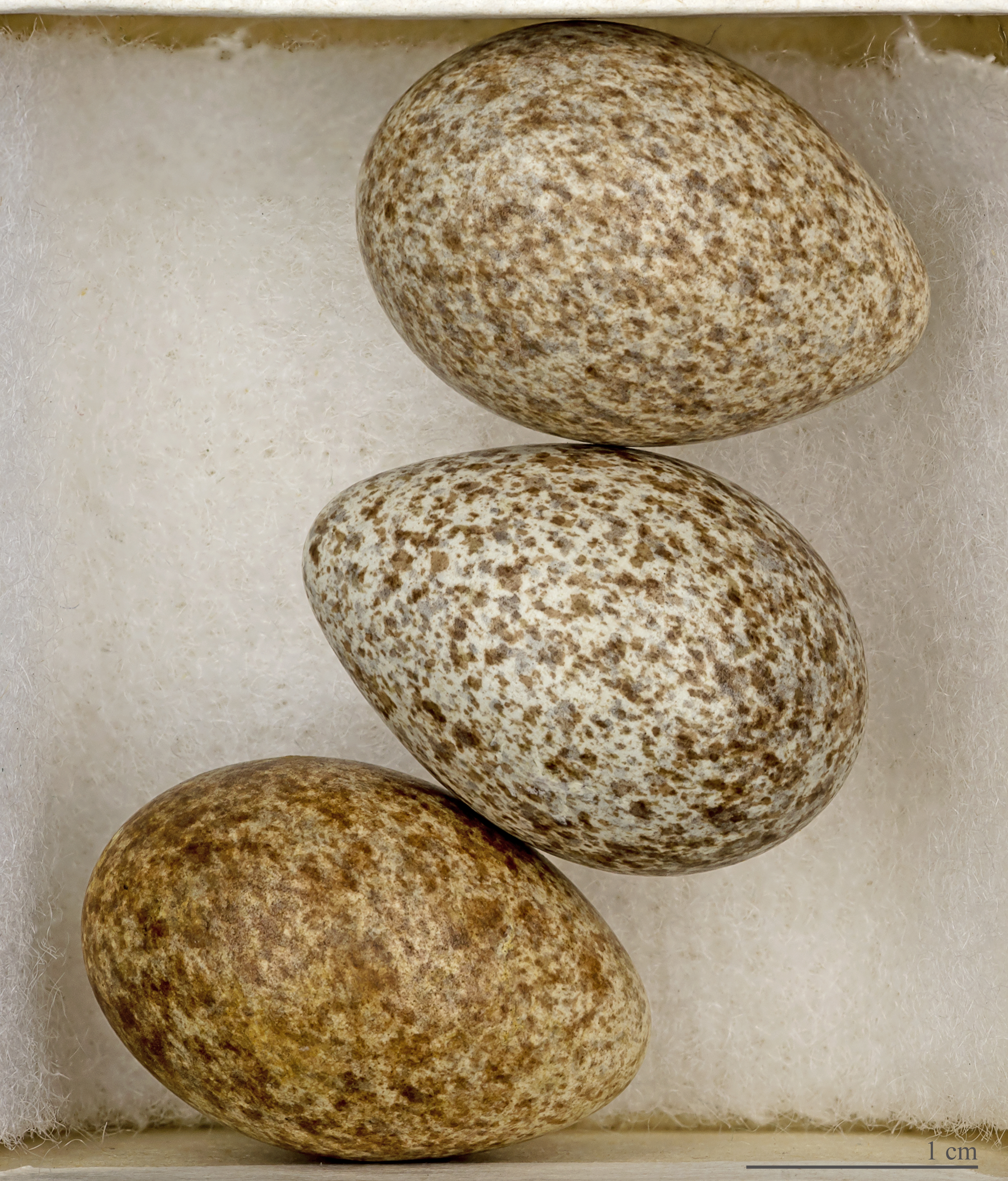
Alauda arvensis - MHNT

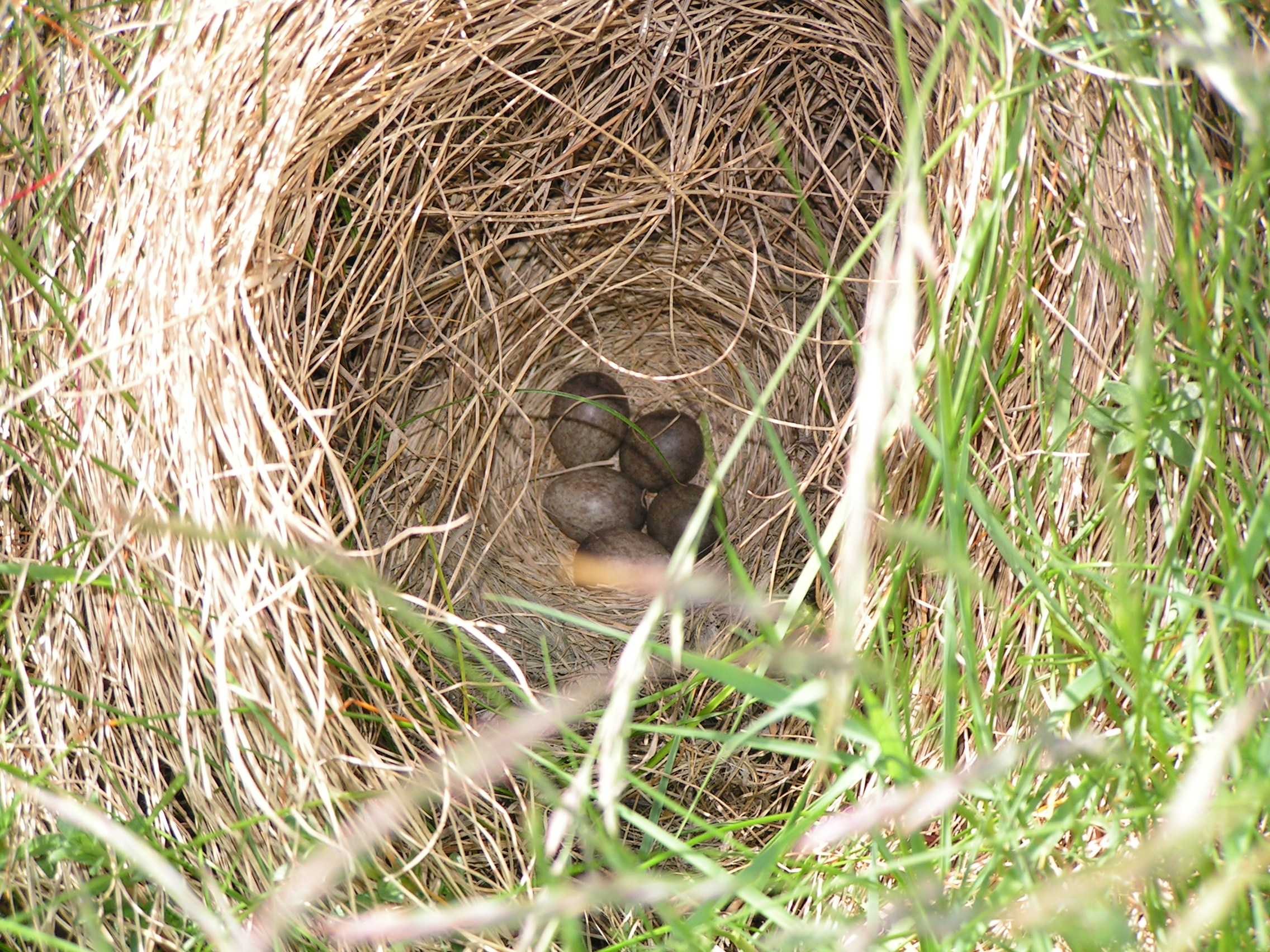
Nest

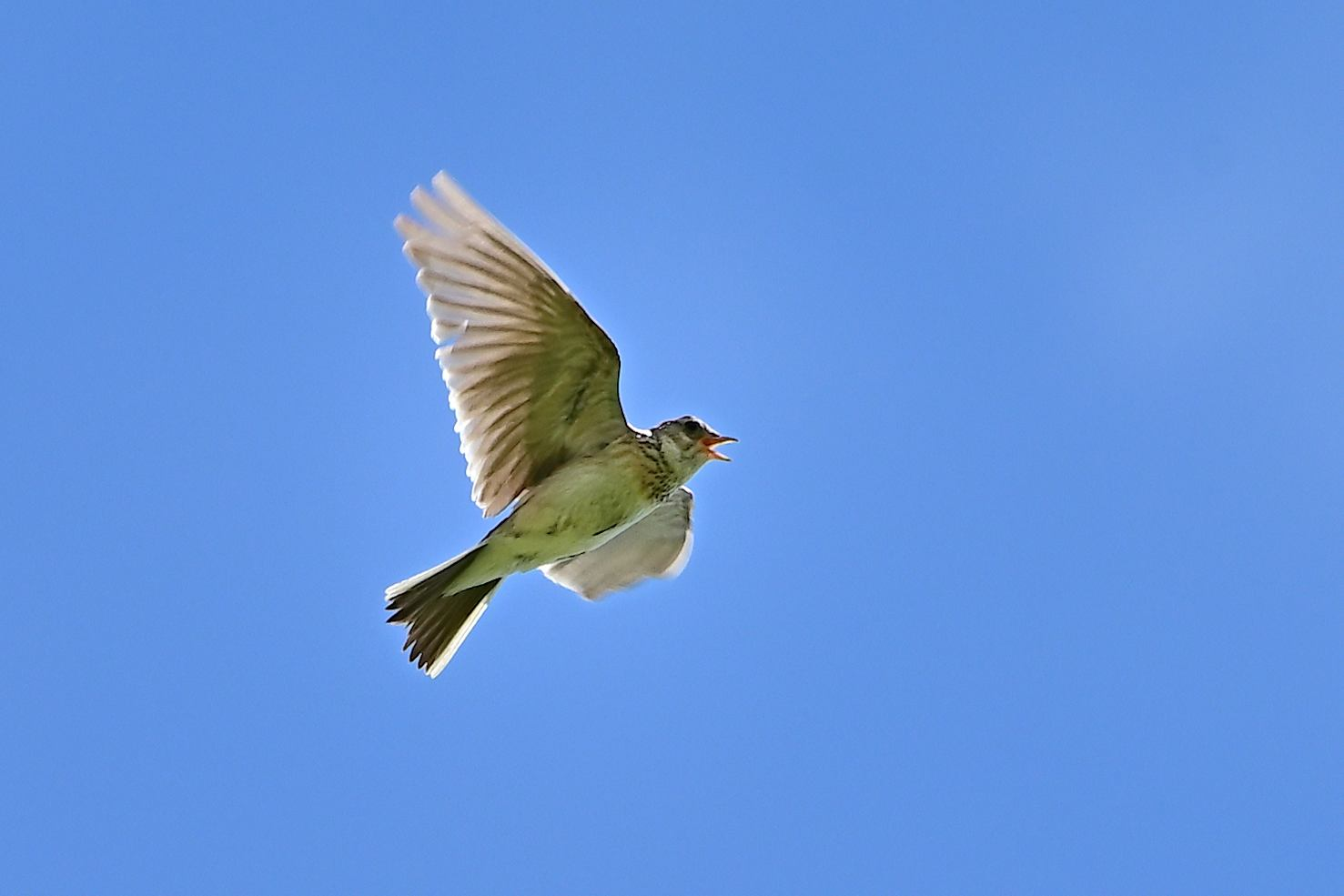
Skylark singing

The Eurasian skylark is 18–19 cm (7.1–7.5 in) in length. Like most other larks, the Eurasian skylark is a rather dull-looking species, being mainly brown above and paler below. It has a short blunt crest on the head, which can be raised and lowered. In flight it shows a short tail and short broad wings. The tail and the rear edge of the wings are edged with white, which are visible when the bird is flying away, but not if it is heading towards the observer. The male has broader wings than the female. This adaptation for more efficient hovering flight may have evolved because of female Eurasian skylarks' preference for males that sing and hover for longer periods and so demonstrate that they are likely to have good overall fitness.

It is known for the song of the male, which is delivered in hovering flight from heights of 50 to 100 m, when the singing bird may appear as just a dot in the sky from the ground. The long, unbroken song is a clear, bubbling warble delivered high in the air while the bird is rising, circling or hovering. The song generally lasts two to three minutes, but it tends to last longer later in the mating season, when songs can last for 20 minutes or more. At wind farm sites, male skylarks have been found to sing at higher frequencies as a result of wind turbine noise. Male Eurasian skylarks display local microdialects, with neighbouring birds sharing distinctive song patterns that function as group signatures and help distinguish local from non-local individuals.

== Distribution and habitat ==
This lark breeds across most of Europe and Asia and in the mountains of north Africa. It is mainly resident in the west of its range, but eastern populations are more migratory, moving further south in winter. Even in the milder west of its range, many birds move to lowlands and the coast in winter. Asian birds, subspecies A. a. pekinensis, appear as vagrants in Alaska.

=== Introduced populations ===
In the 19th century multiple batches of Eurasian skylarks were released in New Zealand beginning in 1864 in Nelson (in the South Island) and in 1867 in Auckland (in the North Island). The wild population increased rapidly and had spread throughout both the North and South Islands by the 1920s.

In Australia the Eurasian skylark was introduced on multiple occasions beginning in 1850. It is now widespread in the southeast of the continent. In New South Wales it mostly occurs south of 33°S. It is widespread throughout Victoria and Tasmania and also occurs in the south-eastern corner of South Australia around Adelaide.

The Eurasian skylark was introduced to the southeastern Hawaiian Islands beginning in 1865. Although once common, it has declined in abundance on Oahu and is no longer found on Kauai. A study published in 1986 found European skylarks remained only on the islands of Hawaii and Maui and estimated a total population of 10,000 individuals.

The Eurasian skylark was introduced to Vancouver Island off the west coast of Canada in 1903; additional birds were introduced in 1913. The population grew and by 1962 there were around 1000 individuals. The numbers have subsequently declined due to loss of habitat, and in 2007 there were estimated to be only around 100 individuals spread over four small areas of the Saanich Peninsula.

== Behaviour and ecology ==
=== Breeding ===
Eurasian skylarks first breed when they are one year of age. Nesting may start in late March or early April. The nest is probably built by the female alone and is a shallow depression in the ground lined with grasses. The clutch is 3 to 5 eggs. The eggs of the nominate subspecies average 23.4 mm × 16.8 mm (0.92 in × 0.66 in) in size and weigh around 3.35 g (0.118 oz). They have a grey-white or greenish background and are covered in brown or olive spots. They are incubated only by the female beginning after the last egg is laid and hatch synchronously after 11 days. The altricial young are cared for by both parents and for the first week are fed almost exclusively on insects. The nestlings fledge after 18 to 20 days but they usually leave the nest after 8 to 10 days. They are independent of their parents after around 25 days. The parents can have up to 4 broods in a season.

=== Feeding ===
The Eurasian skylark walks over the ground searching for food on the soil surface. Its diet consists of insects and plant material such as seeds and young leaves. Unlike a finch (family Fringillidae) it swallows seeds without removing the husk. Insects form an important part of the diet in summer.

=== Threats ===
In the UK, Eurasian skylark numbers have declined since the 1970s, as determined by the Common Bird Census started in the early 1960s by the British Trust for Ornithology. As of 2017, they were estimated to have declined across the UK by 4-10% over the last 10 years, and by 6-28% over the last 22-25 years. The RSPB have shown that this large decline is mainly due to changes in farming practices and only partly due to pesticides. In the past cereals were planted in the spring, grown through the summer and harvested in the early autumn. Cereals are now planted in the autumn, grown through the winter and are harvested in the early summer. The winter grown fields are much too dense in summer for the Eurasian skylark to be able to walk and run between the wheat stems to find its food.

A list of conservation interventions that could impact the species was published by the RSPB. English farmers are now encouraged and paid to maintain and create biodiversity for improving the habitat for Eurasian skylarks. Natural England's Environmental Stewardship Scheme offers 5 and 10-year grants for various beneficial options. For example, there is an option where the farmer can opt to grow a spring cereal instead of a winter one, and leave the stubble untreated with pesticide over the winter. The British Trust for Ornithology likens the stubbles to "giant bird tables" – providing spilt grain and weed seed to foraging birds.

== In culture ==
Eurasian skylark pictured in the coat of arms of Leivonmäki

When the word "lark" is used without specification, it usually refers to this species. A collective noun for Eurasian skylarks is an "exaltation". Although the Oxford English Dictionary describes this usage as "fanciful", it traces it back to a quotation from John Lydgate dating from about 1430. The verb "skylark", originally used by sailors, means "play tricks or practical jokes; indulge in horseplay, frolic". The verb and noun "lark", with similar meaning, may be related to "skylark" or to the dialect word "laik" (New Shorter OED).

The bird is the subject of poems by Percy Bysshe Shelley ("To a Skylark"), George Meredith ("The Lark Ascending"), Ted Hughes ("Skylarks"), and numerous others; and of pieces of music including The Lark Ascending by Ralph Vaughan Williams (inspired by the eponymous poem). It is also the bird emblem of Kumamoto Prefecture. The Skylark of Space is a series of four science fiction novels by E.E. "Doc" Smith.

== Sources ==
- Cramp, Stanley, ed. (1988). "Alauda arvensis Skylark". Handbook of the birds of Europe the Middle East and North Africa. The Birds of the Western Palearctic. Volume V: Tyrant Flycatchers to Thrushes. Oxford: Oxford University Press. pp. 188–205. ISBN 978-0-19-857508-5.
- Donald, Paul F. (2004). The Skylark. London: T. and A.D. Poyser. ISBN 978-0-7136-6568-0.
- Higgins, P.J.; Peter, J.M.; Cowling, S.J., eds. (2006). "Alauda arvensis Skylark" (PDF). Handbook of Australian, New Zealand & Antarctic Birds. Vol. 7, Boatbill to starlings, Part 7 A, Boatbill to larks. Melbourne, Victoria: Oxford University Press. pp. 1039–1052. ISBN 978-0-19-553996-7.
