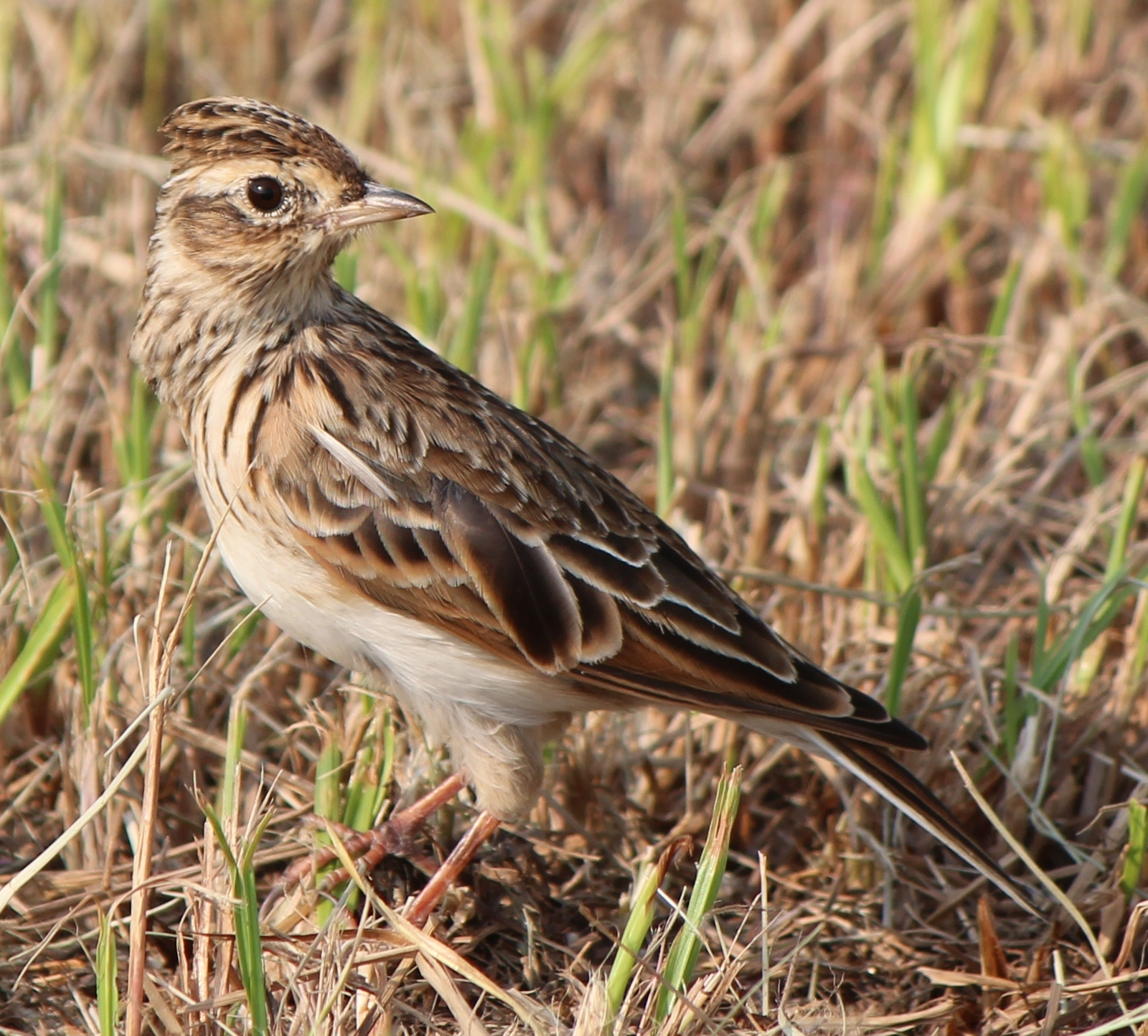

Conservation status
- Least Concern (IUCN 3.1)

Scientific classification
- Kingdom: Animalia
- Phylum: Chordata
- Class: Aves
- Order: Passeriformes
- Family: Alaudidae
- Genus: Alauda
- Species: A. arvensis
- Subspecies: A. a. japonica

Trinomial name
- Alauda arvensis japonica Temminck & Schlegel, 1848

Synonyms
- Alauda japonica

= Japanese skylark =

Subspecies of bird

The Japanese skylark (Alauda arvensis japonica) is a subspecies of the Eurasian skylark. It was formerly considered to be, combined with five other subspecies of skylark, its own separate species, Alauda japonica.
