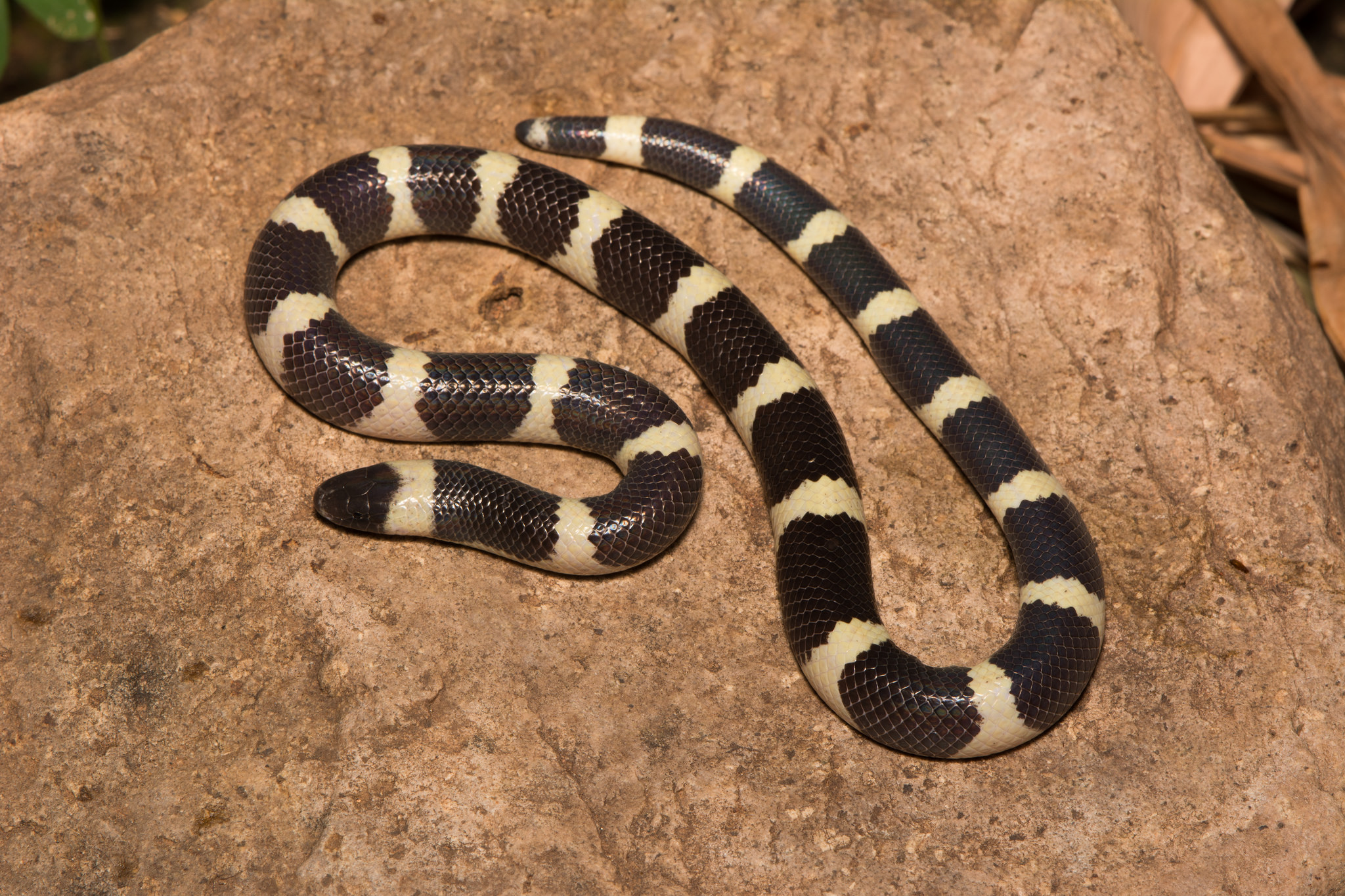
- Mexican short-tailed snake (Sympholis lippiens) from Sonora, México

Conservation status
- Data Deficient (IUCN 3.1)

Scientific classification
- Kingdom: Animalia
- Phylum: Chordata
- Class: Reptilia
- Order: Squamata
- Suborder: Serpentes
- Family: Colubridae
- Genus: Sympholis; Cope, 1861
- Species: S. lippiens

Binomial name
- Sympholis lippiens Cope, 1861

= Sympholis =

Genus of snakes

Sympholis is a genus of snake in the family Colubridae that contains the sole species Sympholis lippiens. It is commonly known as the Mexican short-tail snake.

It is found in Mexico.

== Description ==
It is a black snake with yellow horizontal stripes.
