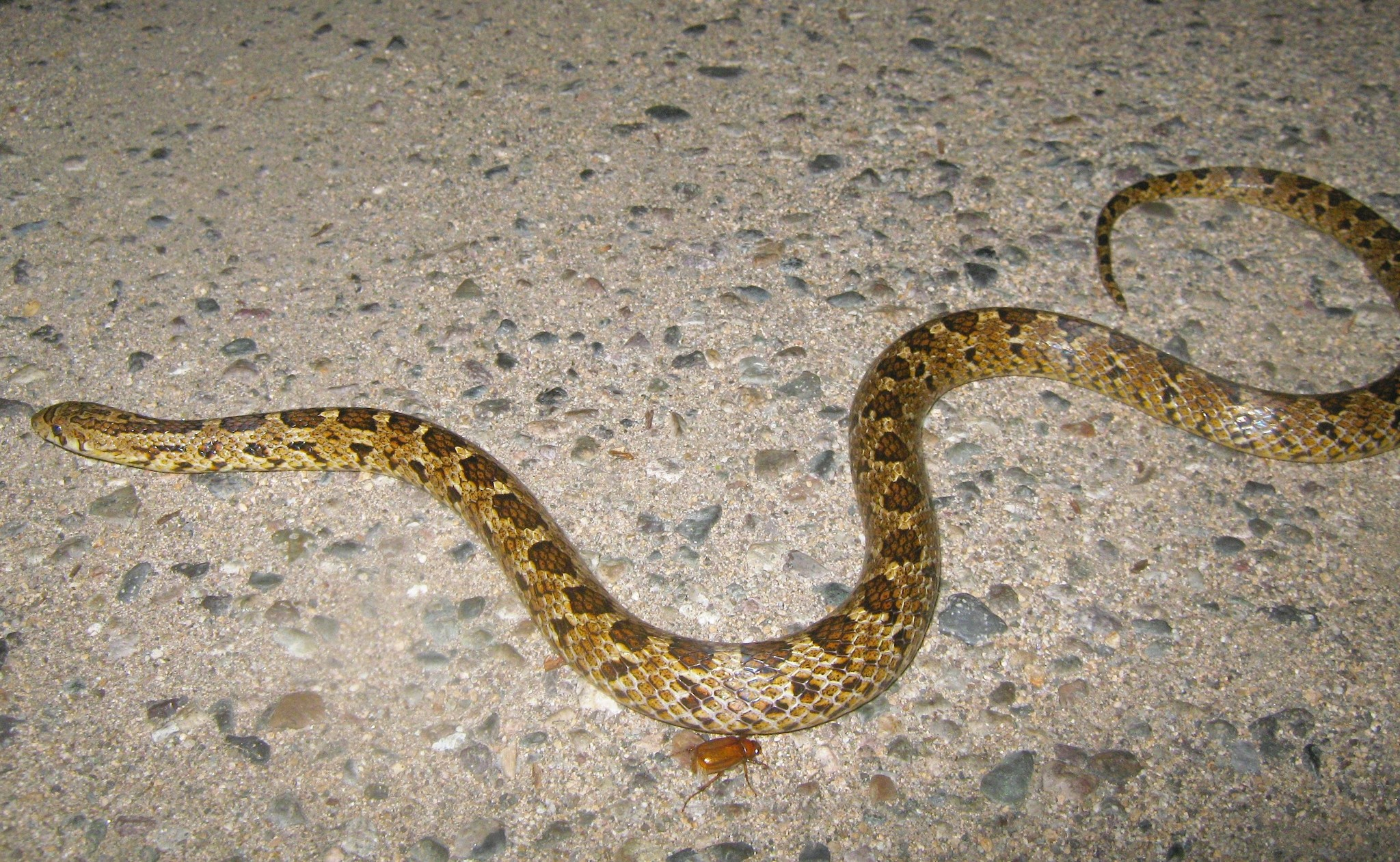
- Pseudoficimia frontalis

Conservation status
- Least Concern (IUCN 3.1)

Scientific classification
- Kingdom: Animalia
- Phylum: Chordata
- Class: Reptilia
- Order: Squamata
- Suborder: Serpentes
- Family: Colubridae
- Genus: Pseudoficimia; Bocourt, 1883
- Species: P. frontalis

Binomial name
- Pseudoficimia frontalis (Cope, 1864)

= Pseudoficimia =

Genus of snakes

Pseudoficimia is a genus of snake in the family Colubridae that contains the sole species Pseudoficimia frontalis. It is commonly known as the false ficimia.

It is found in Mexico.
