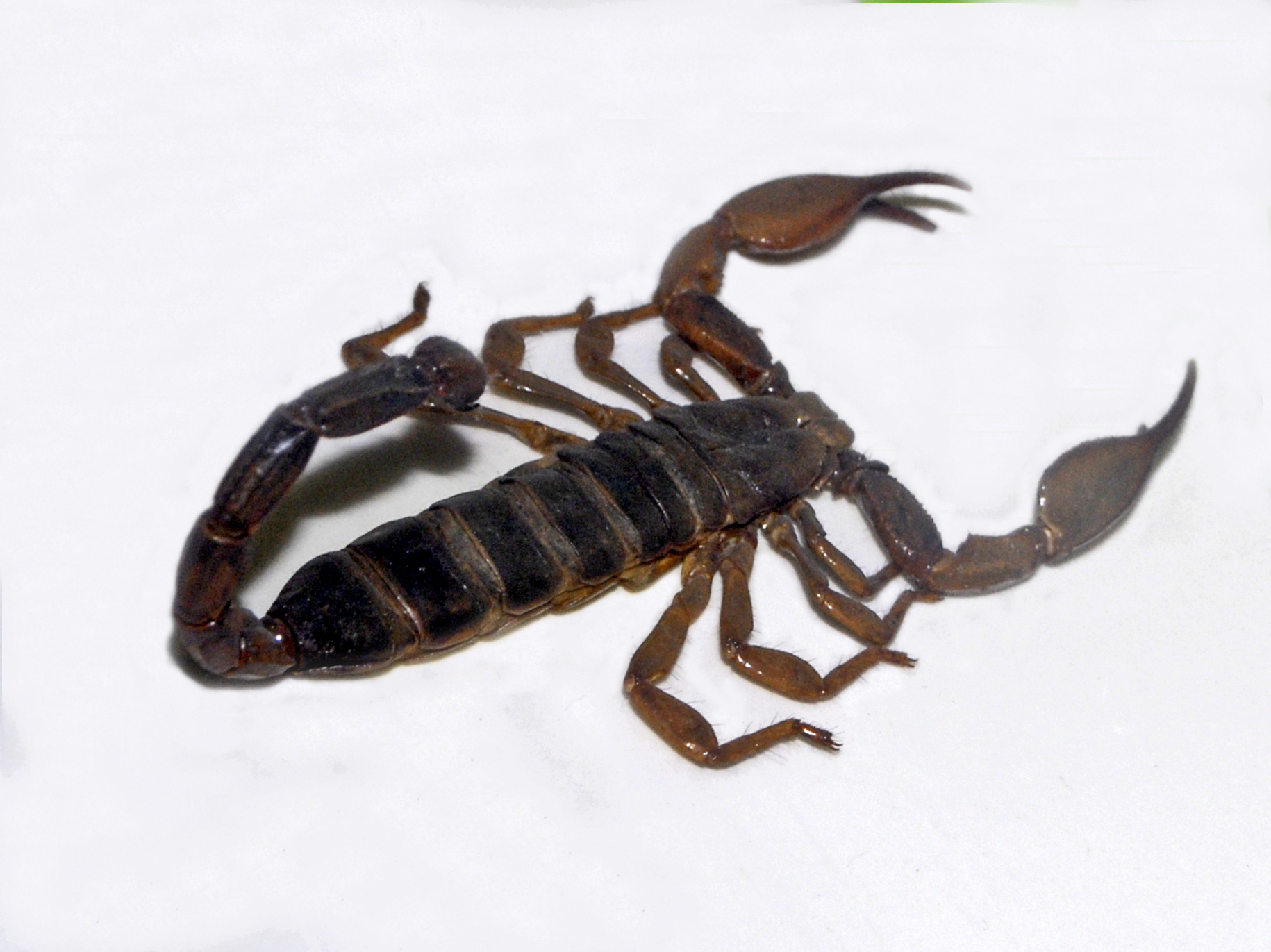
- Museum specimen of Nebo hierichonticus from Israel

Scientific classification
- Kingdom: Animalia
- Phylum: Arthropoda
- Subphylum: Chelicerata
- Class: Arachnida
- Order: Scorpiones
- Family: Diplocentridae
- Genus: Nebo
- Species: N. hierichonticus

Binomial name
- Nebo hierichonticus Simon, 1872

= Nebo hierichonticus =

Species of scorpion

Nebo hierichonticus, the common black scorpion, is a species of scorpion in the family Diplocentridae.

== Description ==
Nebo hierichonticus can reach a length of 14 cm (5.5 in). Its basic color ranges from a light brown or reddish-brown to dark brown. Its legs are yellowish. It has a thin metasoma and large pedipalps and chelae. The base of the sting (vesicle) is oval, with a quite short sting (telson). Venom of this species is quite toxic, causing hemorrhage and necrosis, but the effects of the sting on humans is almost negligible, without any long-term effects.

== Distribution and habitat ==
This species occurs in the Middle East (Lebanon, Syria, Jordan, Israel) and in Egypt in the Sinai Peninsula. It lives under the rocks and in self-dug deep caves in the deserts and in arid to semiarid mountainous regions.
