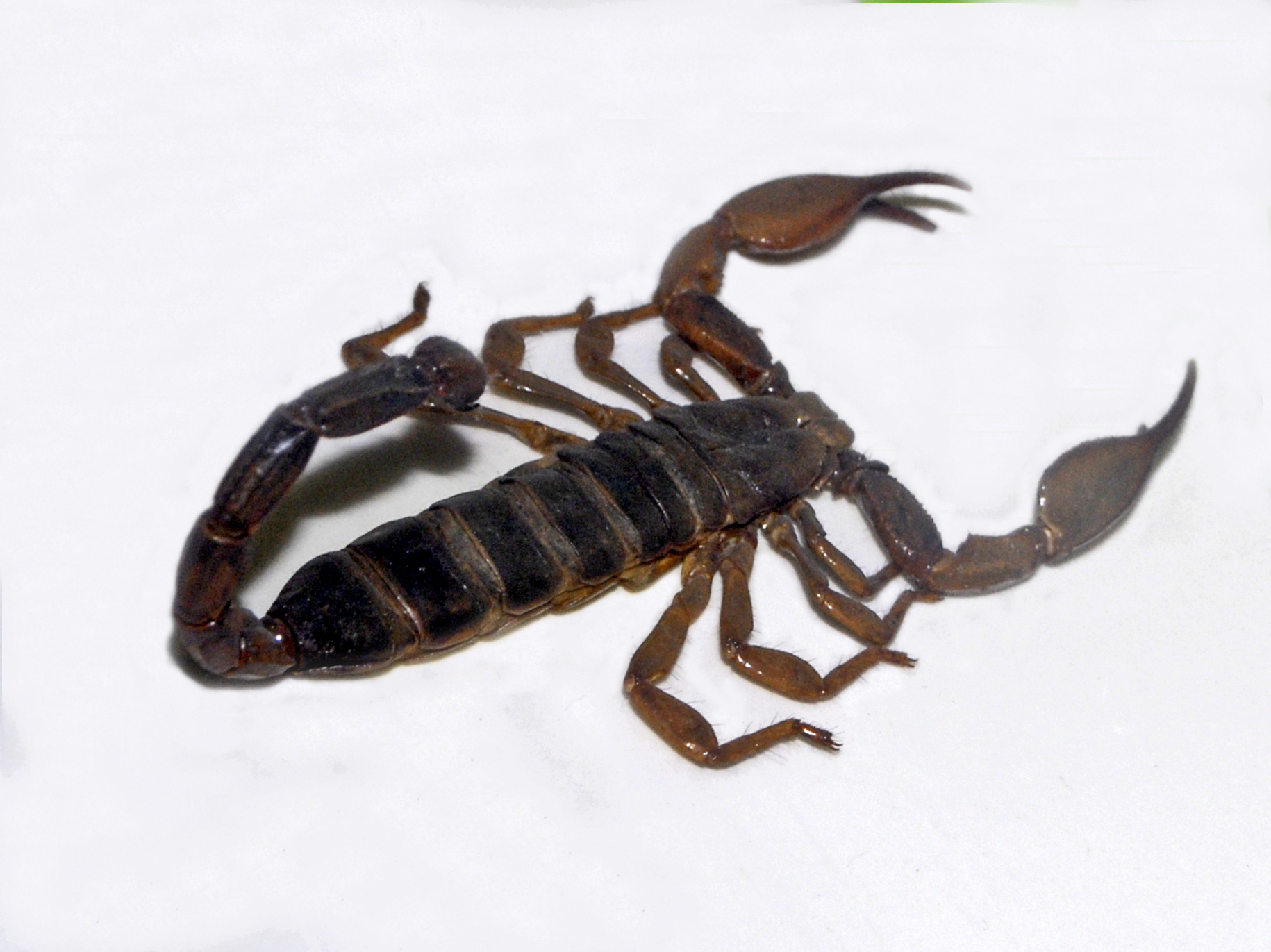
- Museum specimen of Nebo hierichonticus from Israel

Scientific classification
- Domain: Eukaryota
- Kingdom: Animalia
- Phylum: Arthropoda
- Subphylum: Chelicerata
- Class: Arachnida
- Order: Scorpiones
- Superfamily: Scorpionoidea
- Family: Diplocentridae; Karsch, 1880

Genera
- about 9, see text

= Diplocentridae =

Diplocentridae Temporal range: Paleogene–present

Family of scorpions

Diplocentridae is a family of scorpions. The roughly 120 species are mostly native to the New World, except for genus Nebo, which is distributed in the Middle East.

A 2003 study suggests that this family is better treated as a subfamily of the Scorpionidae.

Taxa include:

- Subfamily Diplocentrinae Karsch, 1880
  - Bioculus Stahnke, 1968
  - Cazierius Francke, 1978
  - Didymocentrus Kraepelin, 1905
  - Diplocentrus Peters, 1861
  - Heteronebo Pocock, 1899
  - Kolotl Santibáñez-López, et al., 2014
  - Oiclus Simon, 1880
  - Tarsoporosus Francke, 1978
- Subfamily Nebinae Kraepelin, 1905
  - Nebo Simon, 1878
