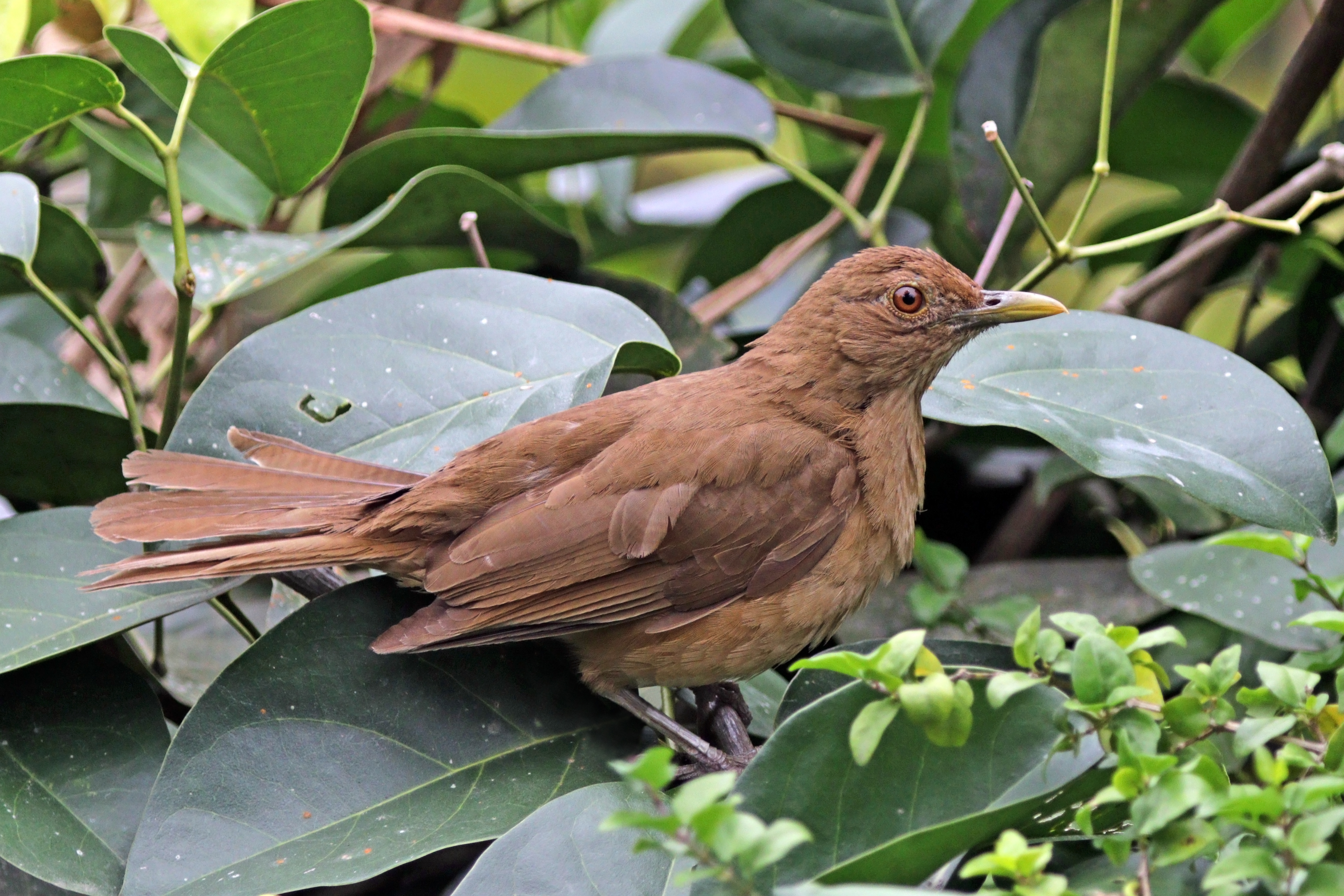
- In Panama

Conservation status
- Least Concern (IUCN 3.1)

Scientific classification
- Kingdom: Animalia
- Phylum: Chordata
- Class: Aves
- Order: Passeriformes
- Family: Turdidae
- Genus: Turdus
- Species: T. grayi

Binomial name
- Turdus grayi Bonaparte, 1838

= Clay-colored thrush =

Species of bird

The clay-colored thrush (Turdus grayi) is a common Middle American bird of the thrush family (Turdidae). It is the national bird of Costa Rica, where it is well known as the yigüirro (Spanish: [ʝi'ɣwiro]). Other common names include clay-colored robin.

== Distribution and habitat ==
It ranges from South Texas (where it is rapidly expanding its range) to northern Colombia. West and north of the Isthmus of Tehuantepec, it is limited to the Atlantic slope, except for a population around Oaxaca City, Mexico that probably originates from escaped cage birds. In much of its range it is familiar in yards and gardens, similar to some other thrushes such as the American robin, the Eurasian blackbird, and the song thrush.

== Description ==
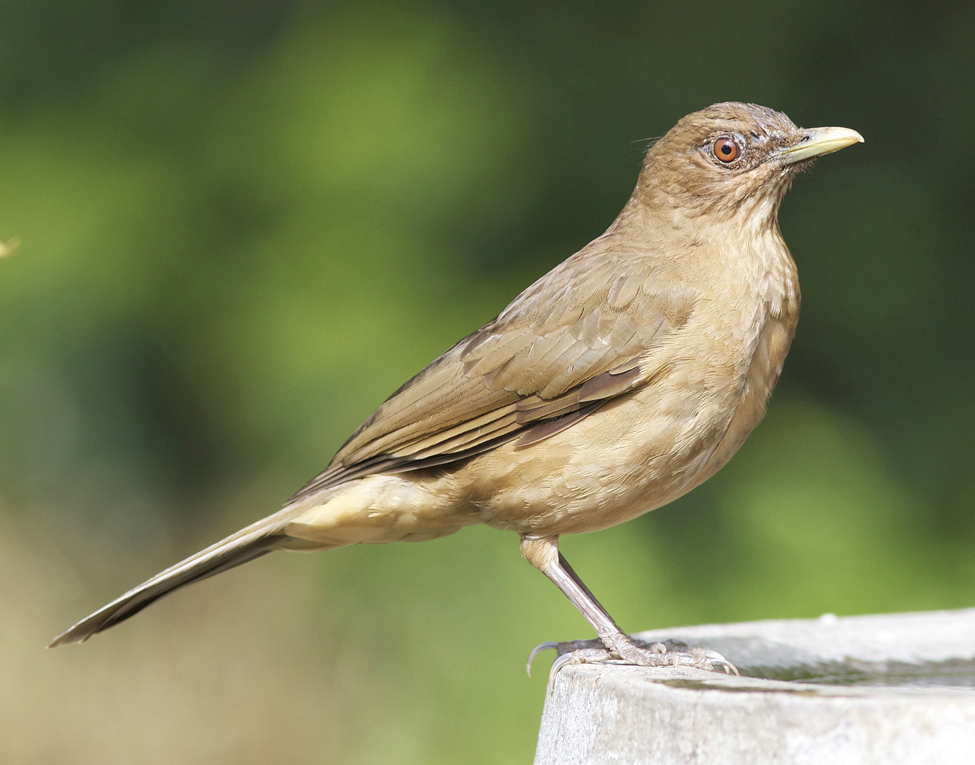
Santo Domingo, Costa Rica

In general appearance and habits it resembles other Turdus thrushes such as the American robin. It is about the same length or slightly smaller: 23–27 cm (9.1–10.6 in), and weighs 74–76 g (2.6–2.7 oz) on average. The plumage is brownish, somewhat lighter below than above, lightest on the flanks. Birds from humid regions are darker than those from dry regions. The throat is faintly streaked. Immature birds have faint mottling on the back and underparts. The bill is greenish-yellow with a dark base, the legs are pinkish or flesh-colored, and the irises are reddish—all useful identification points.

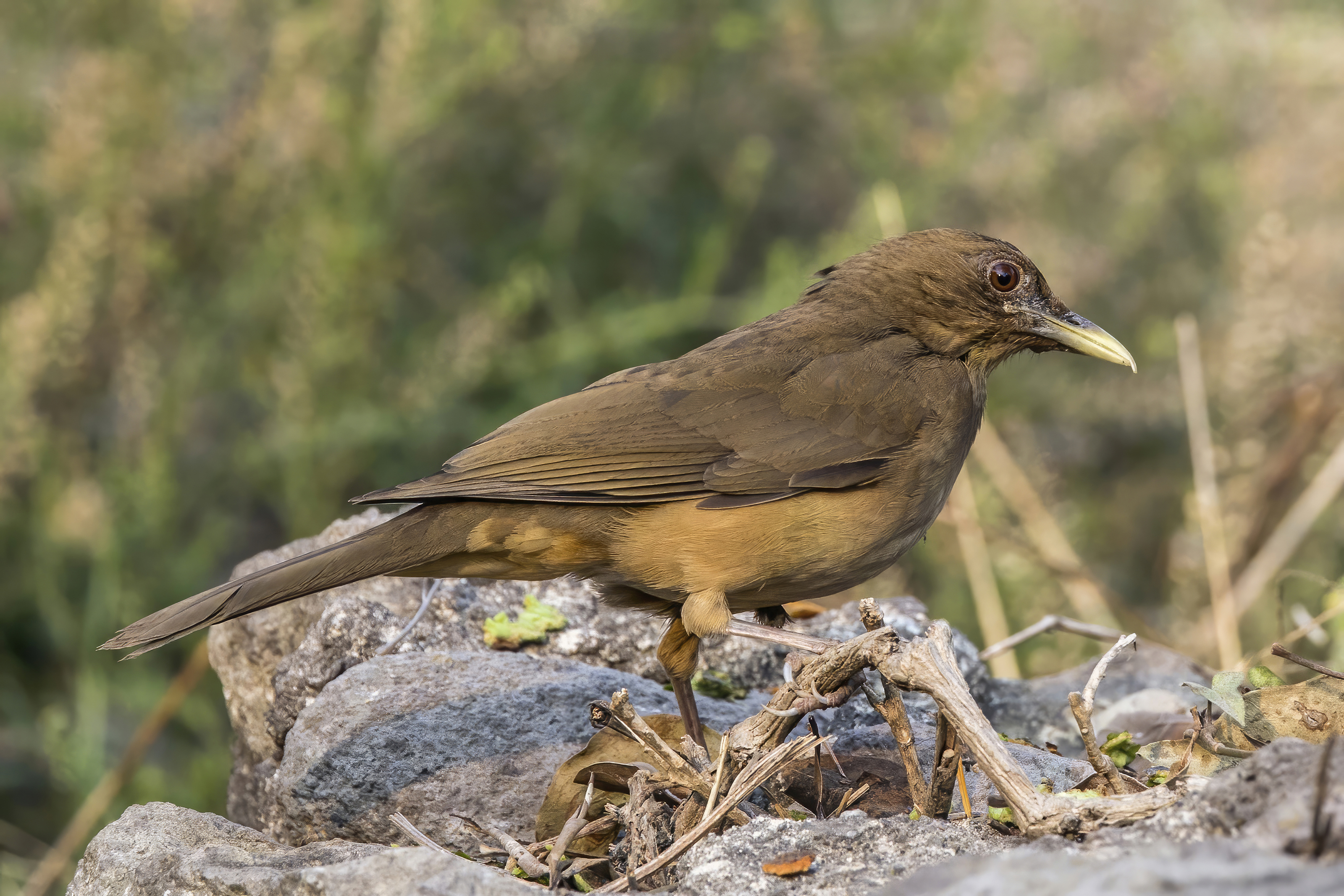
adult T. g. megas, Guatemala

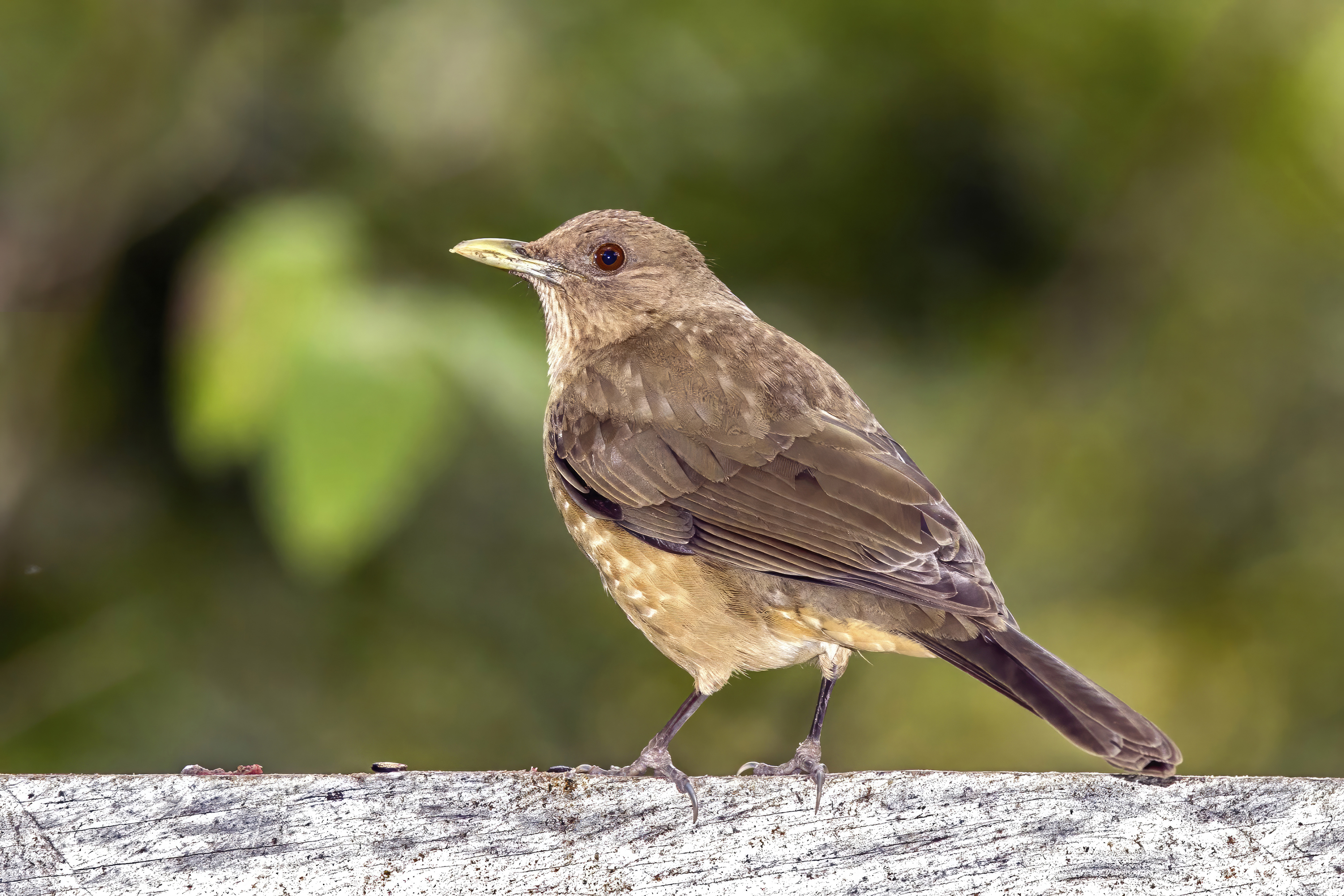
juvenile T. g. megas, Honduras

=== Call ===
The song, rather low-pitched and with a slow steady tempo, consists of many slurred musical phrases which are often repeated irregularly. The tock flight call is like the American robin's but harsher. T. grayi's dry season mating call is quite region-specific, with noticeable differences in calls just a few hundred miles apart.

Alexander Skutch (1904-2004), a naturalist and writer, described the birds call in his book, "A Guide to the Birds of Costa Rica," as "a long-continued caroling of varied phrases, mostly rich and melodious, containing slurred whistles, warbles, short trills, and now and then dry, piercing notes. The song is said by local people to 'call the rains,' and has earned the yigüirro its status as Costa Rica's national bird.".

=== Diet ===
The clay-colored thrush usually forages for fruit or invertebrates on the ground or near it, singly or in pairs, but flocks may feed high in fruiting trees. It will follow army ants to feed on small prey disturbed by the ant columns.

=== Breeding ===
It builds a heavy cup nest of grass, moss, feathers, leaves and mud on a firm support above the ground, which may include human constructions such as windowsills. It lays 2 to 4 pale blue eggs with red-brown and gray markings between March and July and may double-brood. It is aggressive in defense of its nest, having been known to mob raptors as large as golden eagles, but is not otherwise particularly territorial. Aggressive defense against brood parasites may explain why it has not evolved complete recognition of brood parasite eggs; it is one of only very few species of birds that are partial ejectors, with only about 25% of individuals ejecting parasitic eggs of the bronzed cowbird.

== Culture ==
In 1977, Costa Ricans chose the yigüirro as a national symbol (over many much more colorful birds that inhabit the country) due to its strong and melodious song that always comes during the start of the rainy season. In addition, unlike many of the forest songsters of Costa Rica, the present bird has been familiar to the general population since the country's early history, thanks to the species' tendency to live near houses and settlements.
