= Ivan Zalessky =

Russian ornithologist

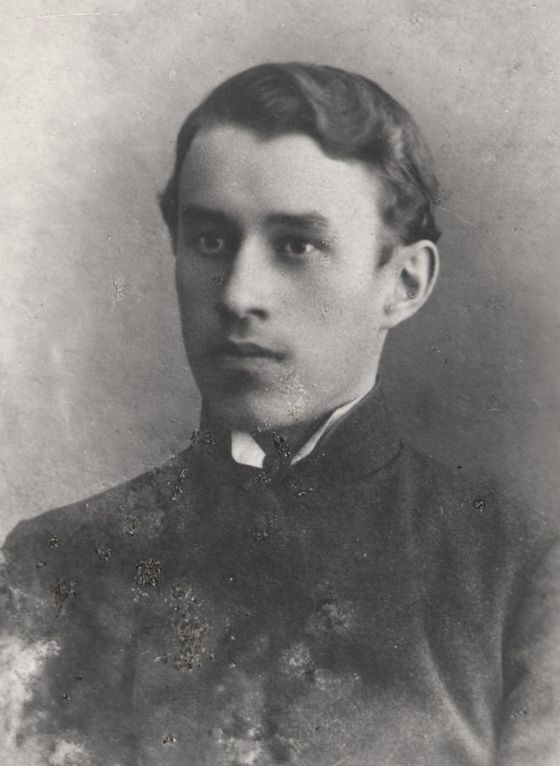

Ivan Mikhailovich Zalessky (Russian: Иван Михайлович Залесский; 1897 – March 17, 1938) was a Russian ornithologist and bird artist who worked in Siberia. He was killed in a Siberian labour camp following arrest for counter-revolutionary activity in the past.

== Life and work ==
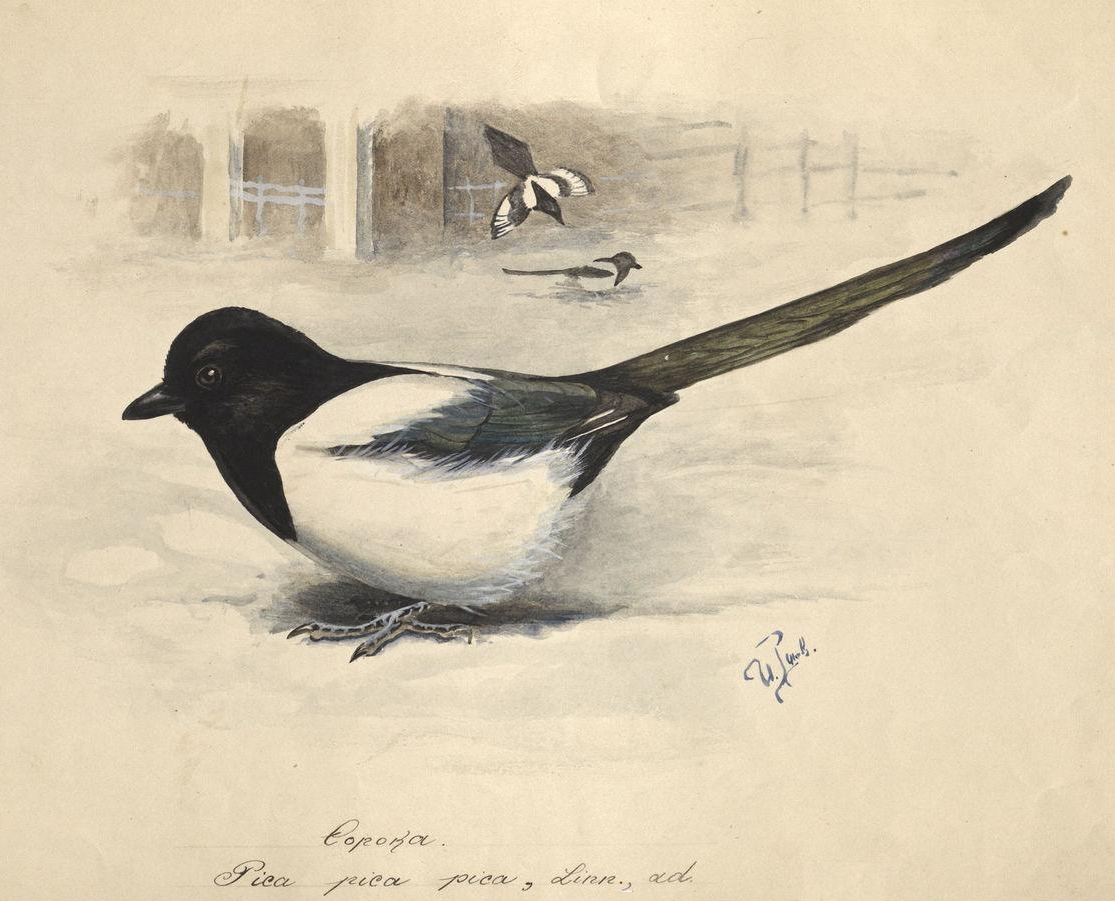
A picture of a magpie c. 1910-15 by Zalessky

Zalessky was born in Tomsk and became interested in birds at an early age along with his brother Pyotr (born 1895). In 1910-15 he began to produce a series of illustrations of the birds of western Siberia. About 59 of the drawings survive. From 1917 he began to publish notes in the Bulletin of the Tomsk ornithological society, of which he was a founding member along with his brother and Hans Johansen. He graduated from military school and spent some time in a field camp in Irkutsk. In 1918 he served as a lieutenant in Kolchak's army but was finally forced to lay down his arms with the other troops. He was released as there were no army crimes against him. In 1920 his family moved to Novosibirsk and he contributed to the Siberian Soviet Encyclopedia while working at the institute of local history. In 1927 he published a manual of taxidermy. On January 31, 1933, he was arrested on charges of being a counter-revolutionary and he was convicted in August and sent for 10 years to the labour camps. He was shot dead on 17 March 1938. His brother Piotr was also killed. He was rehabilitated in 1958. His son Nikolai Zalessky (born 1921) took an interest in ornithology and worked as a specimen preparator at the Tomsk museum.
