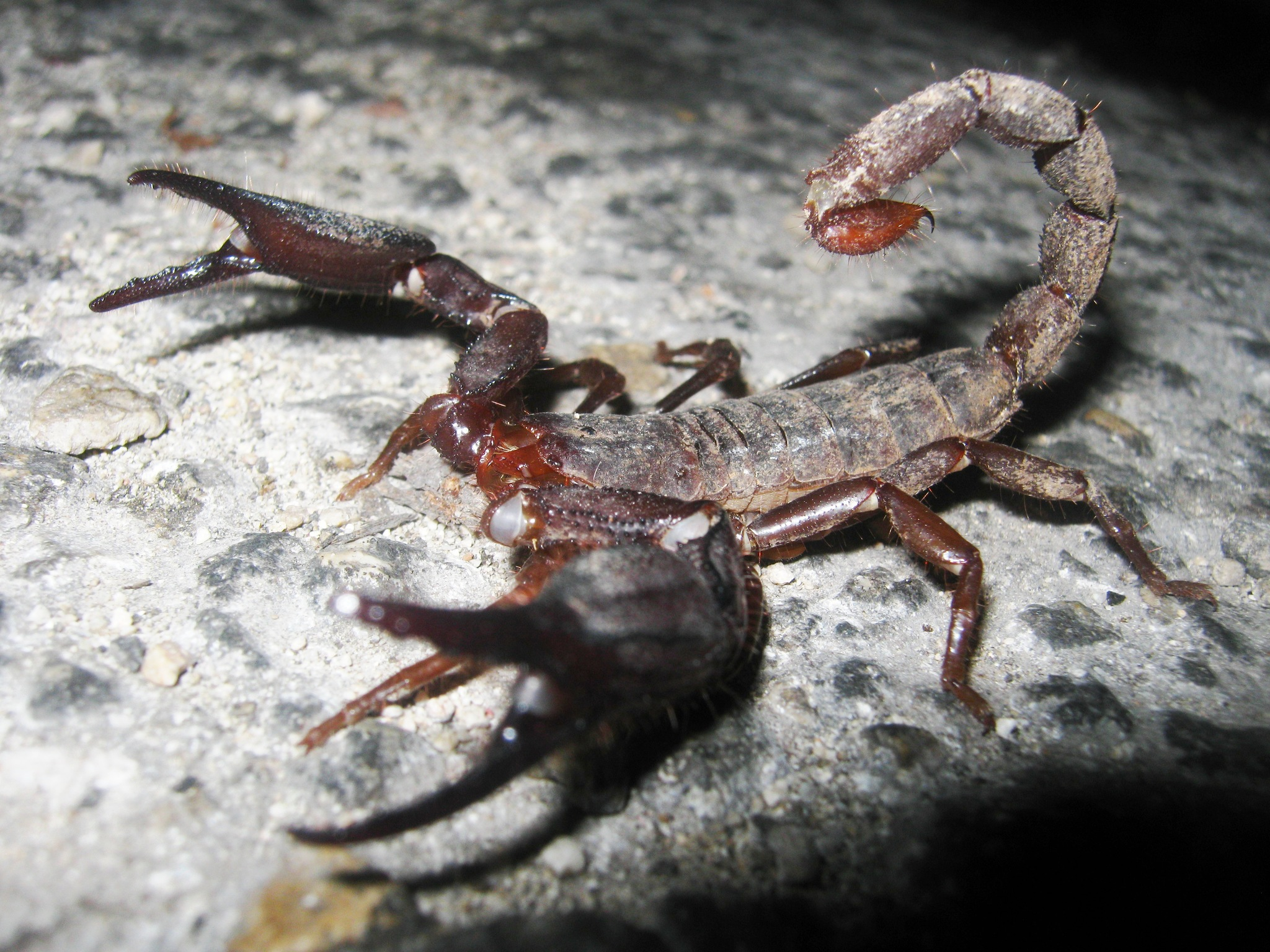
- Diplocentrus reddelli

Scientific classification
- Kingdom: Animalia
- Phylum: Arthropoda
- Subphylum: Chelicerata
- Class: Arachnida
- Order: Scorpiones
- Family: Diplocentridae
- Genus: Diplocentrus; Peters, 1861

= Diplocentrus =

Genus of scorpions

Diplocentrus is a genus of toothed scorpions in the family Diplocentridae. There are more than 60 described species in Diplocentrus, found mainly in Central America, Mexico, and the southwest United States.

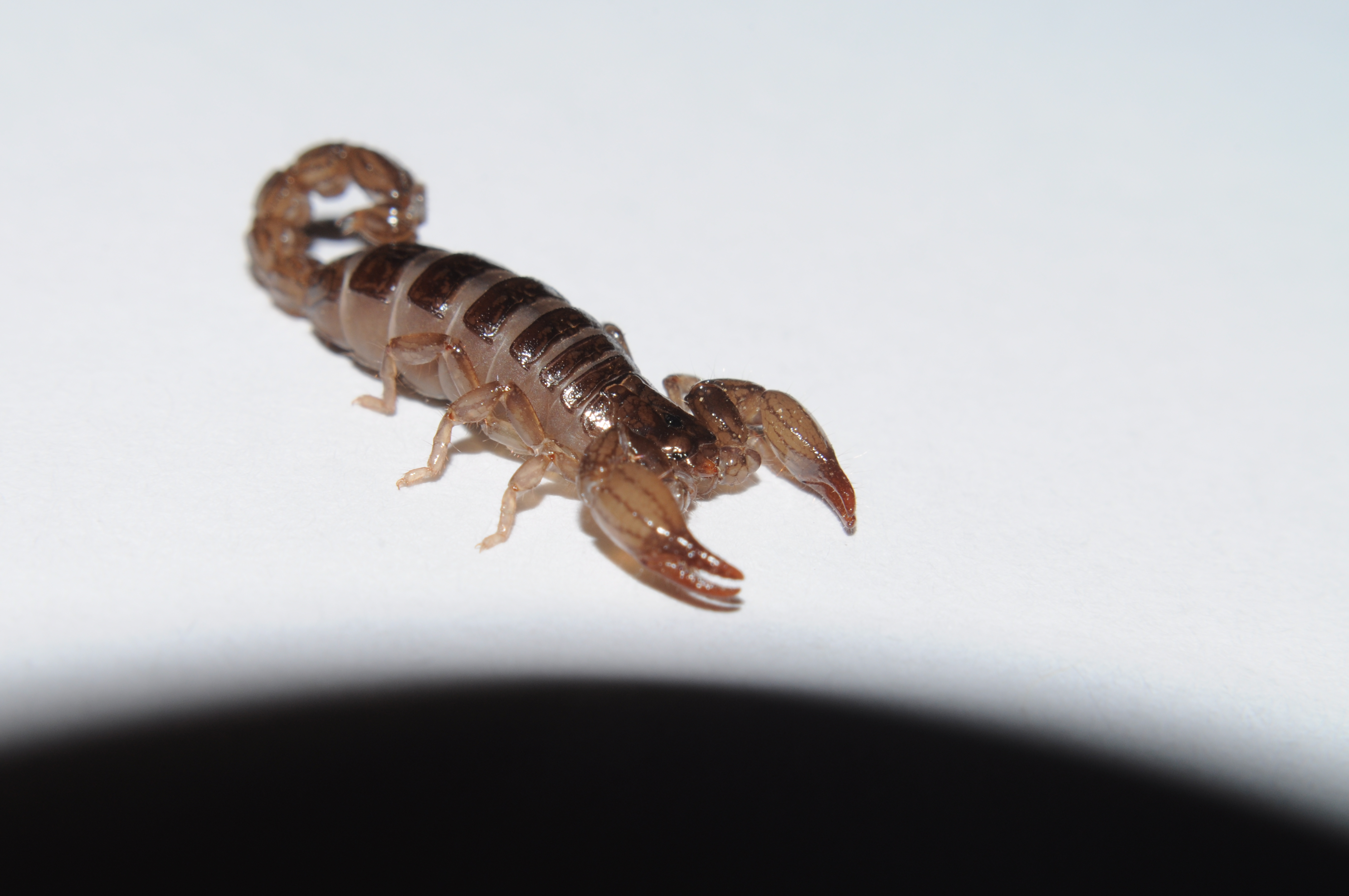
Diplocentrus

== Species ==
These 65 species belong to the genus Diplocentrus:

- Diplocentrus actun Armas & Palacios-Vargas, 2002
- Diplocentrus anophthalmus Francke, 1977
- Diplocentrus bellator Teruel, 2003
- Diplocentrus bereai Armas & Martin-Frias, 2004
- Diplocentrus bicolor Contreras-Felix & Santibanez-Lopez, 2011
- Diplocentrus chiapasensis Beutelspacher & Armas, 1998
- Diplocentrus chol Francke, 2007
- Diplocentrus churumuco Francke & Ponce
- Diplocentrus coddingtoni Stockwell, 1988
- Diplocentrus colwelli Sissom, 1986
- Diplocentrus coylei Fritts & Sissom, 1996
- Diplocentrus cozumel Beutelspacher & Armas, 1998 (Cozumel scorpion)
- Diplocentrus cueva Francke, 1978
- Diplocentrus diablo Stockwell & Nilsson, 1987
- Diplocentrus ferrugineus Fritts & Sissom, 1996
- Diplocentrus formosus Armas & Martin-Frias, 2003
- Diplocentrus franckei Santibáñez-López, 2014
- Diplocentrus gertschi Sissom & Walker, 1992
- Diplocentrus gladiator Beutelspacher & Trujillo, 1999
- Diplocentrus hasethi Kraeplin, 1896
- Diplocentrus hoffmanni Francke, 1977
- Diplocentrus insularis Sagastume-Espinoza et al., 2015
- Diplocentrus jaca Armas & Martin-Frias, 2000
- Diplocentrus keyserlingii Karsch, 1880
- Diplocentrus kraepelini Santibanez-Lopez, Francke & Prendini, 2013
- Diplocentrus lachua Armas, Trujillo & Agreda, 2011
- Diplocentrus landelinoi Trujillo & Armas, 2012
- Diplocentrus lindo Stockwell & Baldwin, 2001 (Lindo scorpion)
- Diplocentrus longimanus Santibanez-Lopez, Francke & Athanasiadis, 2011
- Diplocentrus lourencoi
- Diplocentrus lucidus Stockwell, 1988
- Diplocentrus luisae Guijosa, 1973
- Diplocentrus majahuensis Baldazo Monsivaiz, 2003
- Diplocentrus maya Francke, 1977
- Diplocentrus melici Armas, Martin-Frias & Berea, 2004
- Diplocentrus mellici
- Diplocentrus mexicanus Peters, 1861
- Diplocentrus mitchelli Francke, 1977
- Diplocentrus mitlae Francke, 1977
- Diplocentrus montecristo Armas & Martin-Frias, 2000
- Diplocentrus motagua Armas & Trujillo, 2009
- Diplocentrus ochoteranai
- Diplocentrus ochoterenai Hoffmann, 1931
- Diplocentrus ornatus Stockwell, 1988
- Diplocentrus oxlajujbaktun Trujillo & Armas, 2012
- Diplocentrus peloncillensis Francke, 1975
- Diplocentrus perezi Sissom, 1991
- Diplocentrus rectimanus Pocock, 1898
- Diplocentrus reddelli Francke, 1977
- Diplocentrus roo Armas & Martin-Frias, 2005
- Diplocentrus sagittipalpus Santibanez-Lopez, Francke & Prendini, 2013
- Diplocentrus santiagoi Stockwell, 1988
- Diplocentrus silanesi Armas & Martin-Frias, 2000
- Diplocentrus sinaan Armas & Martin-Frias, 2000
- Diplocentrus sissomi Santibanez-Lopez, Francke & Prendini, 2013
- Diplocentrus spec Stockwell, 1988
- Diplocentrus spitzeri Stahnke, 1970 (Spitzer's scorpion)
- Diplocentrus steeleae Stockwell, 1988
- Diplocentrus taibeli (Caporiacco, 1938)
- Diplocentrus tehuacanus Hoffmann, 1931
- Diplocentrus tehuano Francke, 1977
- Diplocentrus tenango Santibanez-Lopez & Francke, 2008
- Diplocentrus whitei (Gervais, 1844) (Big Bend scorpion)
- Diplocentrus williamsi Sissom & Wheeler, 1995
- Diplocentrus zacatecanus Hoffmann, 1931
