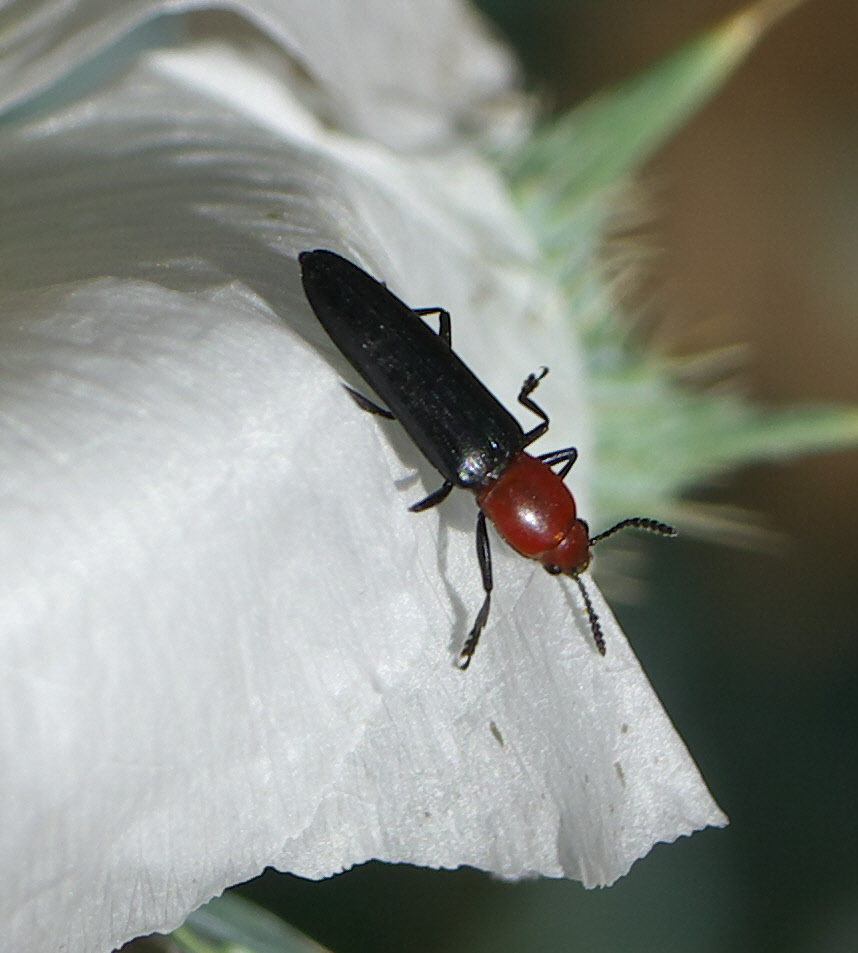
- Unidentified Languria adult in Dickens County, Texas, USA

Scientific classification
- Kingdom: Animalia
- Phylum: Arthropoda
- Clade: Pancrustacea
- Class: Insecta
- Order: Coleoptera
- Suborder: Polyphaga
- Infraorder: Cucujiformia
- Family: Erotylidae
- Tribe: Languriini
- Genus: Languria; Latreille, 1802

Type species
- Languria ruficollis Latreille, 1802

Synonyms
- Janessa Chevrolat in Dejean 1837; Languiria (lapsus?); Langura (lapsus?)

= Languria =

Genus of beetles

Languria is an American genus in the pleasing fungus beetle family (Erotylidae). They belong to the lizard beetle tribe Languriini of subfamily Languriinae; formerly, their subfamily was considered a distinct family, and their tribe upranked to subfamily status, whereas some recent authors prefer to merge Languriinae into subfamily Erotylinae.

This genus is native to North and Central America; of the almost 20 species, three range as far north as Canada, but most inhabit Florida and adjacent regions. One species, L.mozardi, is occasionally found outside the Americas as introduced individuals. These beetles are slim and small, typically with blackish elytra and a red pronotum, sometimes with a black mark on the latter and/or red marks on the former. The head is red or black depending on species. They measure about half an inch (~13 mm) in length at most but sometimes as short as 4 mm; some species have extreme individual variation in size and/or polymorphism in coloration. In most of their range, Languria can be distinguished from other lizard beetles by the tips of their elytra being smoothly rounded, with a slight curve or bluntness at most.

== Species ==
Sometimes, L.bicolor (under its original name Trogosita bicolor) or L.mozardi are cited as type species of this genus. However, the genus, when first established, contained only a single species, L.ruficollis, which is a junior synonym of L.bicolor.

There are almost 20 species placed in Languria.

- Languria angustata (Palisot de Beauvois, 1805) – eastern black-headed lizard beetle (= L.femoralis, L.pulchra, L.uhlerii)
- Languria bicolor (Fabricius, 1798)
- Languria californica Fall, 1901
- Languria collaris LeConte, 1854
- Languria convexicollis Horn, 1868
- Languria denticulata Schaeffer, 1918
- Languria discoidea LeConte, 1854
- Languria interstitialis Casey
- Languria irregularis Casey, 1916
- Languria laeta LeConte, 1854
- Languria marginipennis Schwarz, 1878
- Languria mozardi Latreille, 1807 – clover stem borer (= L.cyanipennis)
- Languria sanguinicollis Chevrolat, 1834
- Languria taedata LeConte, 1854 (= L.erythrocephala, L.rufiventris)
- Languria trifasciata Say, 1823
- Languria uhlerii Horn, 1862

Numerous species formerly placed here – mostly non-American ones – are now in other genera, namely Anadastus and Caenolanguria. In addition to these, other species formerly in Languria are:

- Acropteroxys gracilis (= "L." divisa, "L." gracilis)
- Clerolanguria tricolor (= "L." formosa)
- Dasydactylus sellatus (= "L." sellata)
- Languriomorpha lewisii (= "L." lewisii)
- Langurites lineatus (= "L. latitarsa" (nomen nudum), "L." vitticollis)
- Microlanguria jansoni (= "L." jansoni)
- Paulianus illaetabilis (= "L." illaetabilis)
- Promecolanguria dimidiata (= "L." dimidiata)
- Serralanguria ochreipennis (= "L." ochreipennis)
- Tomolanguria aculeata (= "L." aculeata)
