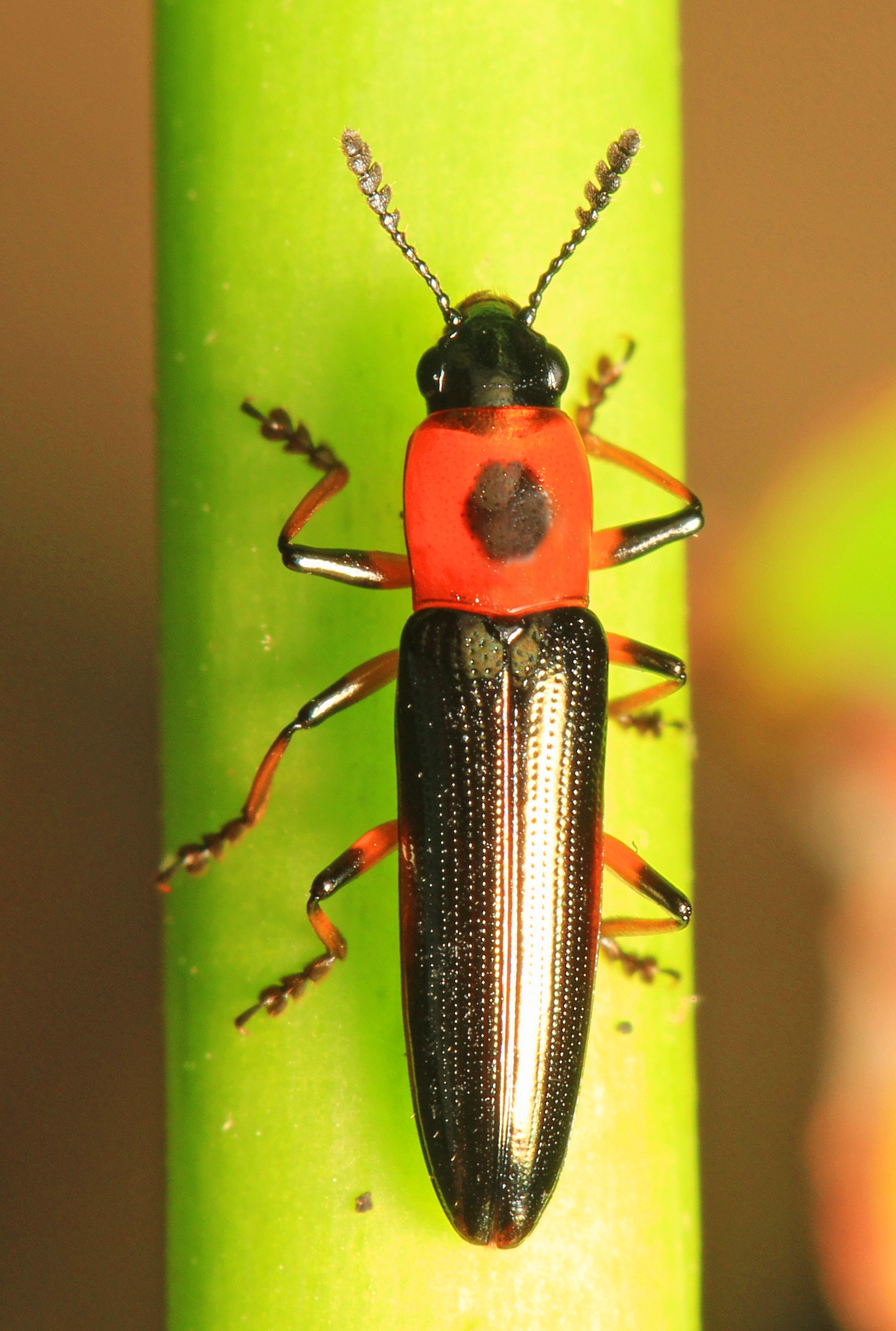
- Adult with unusually prominent black pronotal spot (Wye Island NRMA, Queenstown, Maryland)

Scientific classification
- Kingdom: Animalia
- Phylum: Arthropoda
- Clade: Pancrustacea
- Class: Insecta
- Order: Coleoptera
- Suborder: Polyphaga
- Infraorder: Cucujiformia
- Family: Erotylidae
- Genus: Languria
- Species: L. angustata

Binomial name
- Languria angustata (Palisot de Beauvois, 1805)

Synonyms
- Languria femoralis Motschulsky, 1860; Languria pulchra LeConte, 1854; Languria uhlerii Horn, 1862

= Languria angustata =

Species of beetle

Languria angustata, the eastern black-headed lizard beetle is a North American species of pleasing fungus beetle (family Erotylidae). It belongs to the lizard beetle tribe (Languriini) of subfamily Languriinae; formerly, their subfamily was considered a distinct family, and their tribe upranked to subfamily status, whereas some recent authors prefer to merge Languriinae into subfamily Erotylinae.

This beetle is only found in North America, where it is usually encountered from March to October. It occurs from Ontario in Canada to Iowa in the USA, and in the south from northern Florida to eastern Texas. Most records are from the northeast of its range.

== Description ==
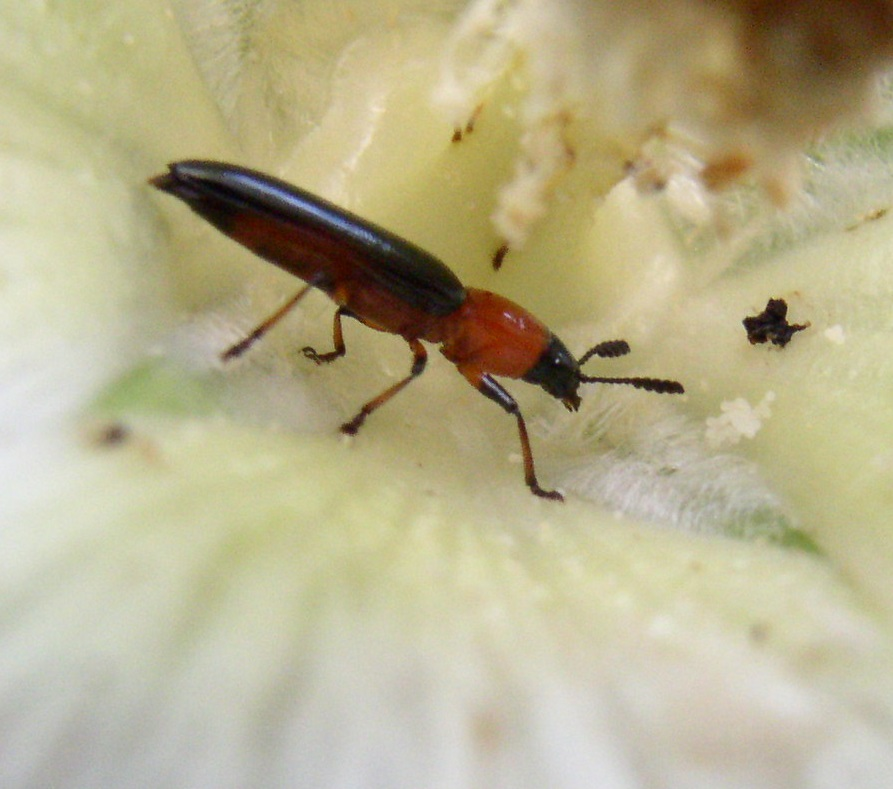
Adult with the more usual unspotted pronotum near Pennypack Creek (Montgomery County, Pennsylvania)

This is a smallish beetle even by the standards of its family, with adults being 6-9 mm long. It is mostly blackish overall on the upperside, with a red pronotum that in some individuals has a somewhat indistinct black spot. The underside is also mostly red, but the head, the last two segments of the abdomen and usually also the metasternum are blackish. The femora of the forelegs are black with red bases, and those of the mid- and hindlegs are red with black tips; the tibiae are all red, and the tarsi all blackish. The antennae have a long and conspicuous "club" at the tip, consisting of the abruptly widened last 5 segments.

Its close relative Languria bicolor usually has a clearly delimited black spot on the pronotum, but may lack it entirely; more reliable distinguishing traits are its black legs and a red head. Another close relative, L. taedata, is also somewhat variable and may look almost alike to L.angustata in coloration; however, it always has much more delicate and less wide antenna "clubs".

Due to its variable pronotum pattern, less "typical" individuals of L.angustata have been described as supposedly new species. One such taxon, L.femoralis, has historically also been used for the related and distinct species L.collaris.
