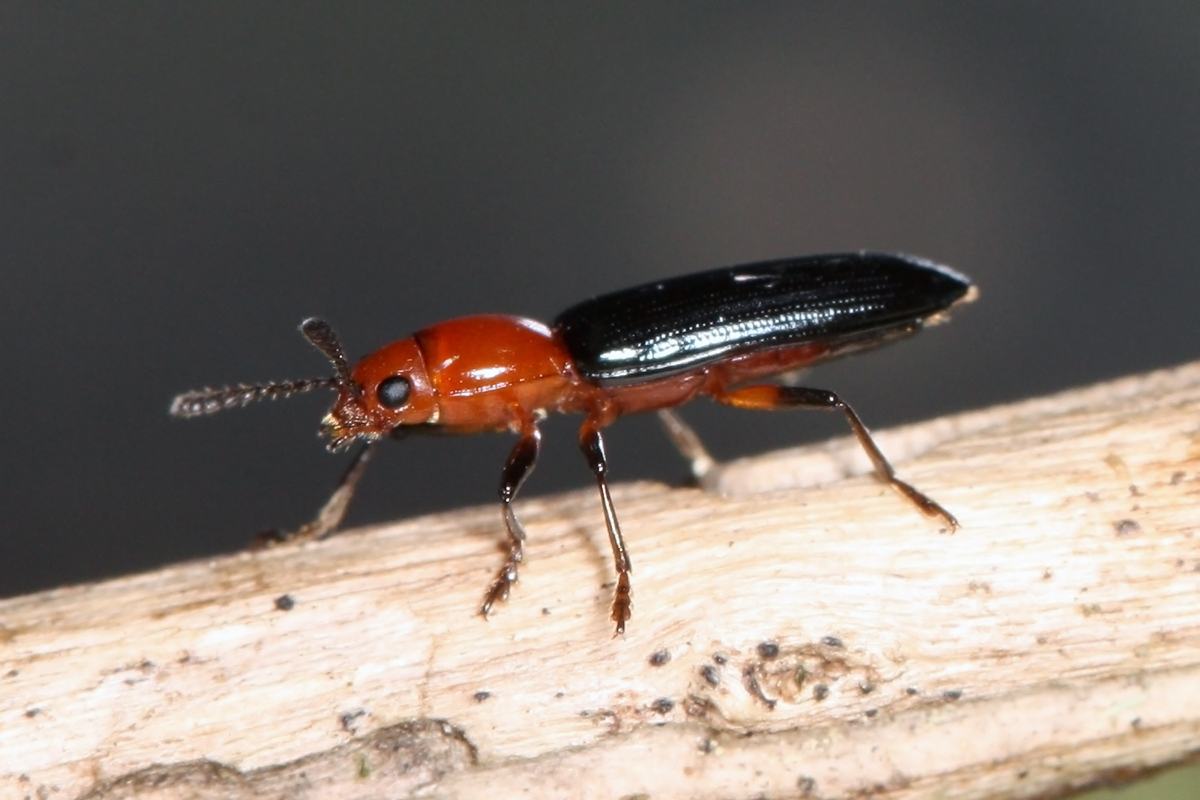
- Adult from Shelby Park (Nashville, Tennessee)

Scientific classification
- Kingdom: Animalia
- Phylum: Arthropoda
- Clade: Pancrustacea
- Class: Insecta
- Order: Coleoptera
- Suborder: Polyphaga
- Infraorder: Cucujiformia
- Family: Erotylidae
- Genus: Languria
- Species: L. mozardi

Binomial name
- Languria mozardi Latreille, 1807

Synonyms
- Languria cyanipennis Crotch, 1876; Languria mozarti (lapsus)

= Languria mozardi =

Species of beetle

Languria mozardi, the clover stem borer, is a North American species of lizard beetle (tribe Languriini within the family Erotylidae, the pleasing fungus beetles).

Two subspecies are generally included in this species:

- Languria mozardi mozardi Latreille, 1807
- Languria mozardi occidentalis Vaurie, 1950

A third subspecies, Languria mozardi cyanipennis, established by George Crotch in 1876 as a supposedly distinct species but later included in L.mozardi, is sometimes recognized.

== Description ==
This is a smallish beetle even by the standards of its family, with adults being 4–9 mm long. They are mostly red in color, with black elytra, red-based brown legs, and blackish antennae; the last 1–3 ventrites of the abdomen are also blackish. The antenna "clubs" are fairly narrow and consist of the last 5 segments which gradually widen; the first of these (segment 7) is less than twice as wide as the segments of the antenna "stem". In general, the "club" segments are expanded more towards the centerline of the beetle than to the outsides.

The similar relative Languria laeta is common on the Great Plains, where L.mozardi is more rare. L. laeta is typically found on pricklypoppy (Argemone), which is not often visited by L.mozardi.

== Distribution and ecology ==
This beetle is found in North America, and usually encountered from February to November. In the north of its range, it occurs from Quebec to Manitoba in Canada, and in the south from Florida to Arizona in the United States, and onwards near the Gulf of Mexico coast into Mexico at least to the Isthmus of Tehuantepec. It is a common species, in fact the most common lizard beetle of North America.

These beetles can be found on a variety of plants, in particular from the sunflower family (Asteraceae) but also others (Apiaceae, Asteraceae, Brassicaceae, Campanulaceae, Fabaceae, Malvaceae, Poaceae, Urticaceae). This larvae are stem borers and can infest economically important species such as alfalfa (Medicago sativa), canola (Brassica rapa) and red clover (Trifolium pratense).
