= Lepidotoramus =

Scientific classification
- Kingdom: Animalia
- Phylum: Arthropoda
- Clade: Pancrustacea
- Class: Insecta
- Order: Coleoptera
- Suborder: Polyphaga
- Infraorder: Cucujiformia
- Family: Erotylidae
- Genus: Lepidotoramus; Leschen, 1997
- Species: L. grouvellei

Binomial name
- Lepidotoramus grouvellei Leschen, 1997

Genus of beetles

Lepidotoramus is a monotypic genus of pleasing fungus beetles (family Erotylidae), established in 1997 by Richard Leschen of Landcare Research to contain the single species Lepidotoramus grouvellei. The genus name combines the Greek word lepís (λεπίς) for a scale like on a fish's skin with the name of the related genus Toramus; the species name honors noted Cucujoidea researcher Antoine Grouvelle.

Some authors place this genus in tribe Empocryptini of subfamily Cryptophilinae, others accept fewer subfamilies in the Erotylidae and place Lepidotoramus in tribe Cryptophilini or Empocryptini of subfamily Xenoscelinae. At first, Lepidotoramus was allied with the lizard beetles, at that time held to be a distinct family Languriidae, wherein Lepidotoramus was placed in subfamily Toraminae. But the "Languriidae" was actually paraphyletic with Erotylidae, and not long after the genus' description was merged into it.

== Description ==
L.grouvellei adults are very small beetles, only 2.1-3 mm (around 0.1 in) long, stoutly oval in shape, with a rounded back, and antennae which end in conspicuous loose "clubs". After emerging from the pupa, they are light brown, darkening to chestnut brown as their exoskeleton hardens. The pronotum is darker, almost blackish, as is the rearmost quarter of the elytra. The exoskeleton is covered in punctuations of about 0.001 mm in diameter, each bearing a moderately long hair with a down-curled tip.

Head
The punctures on the top of head are separated by 1-3 times their diameter, but on the "throat" they are denser, separated by at most their own diameter and often only half as much. The compound eyes are bulging, with 20-22 small ommatidia at their greatest length, and many bristles in the rear. Behind the eyes, there is a tiny honeycombed structure of unknown purpose. The line above the eyes is barely visible, and the seam between the "forehead" and the clypeus is at most a barely visible thin line; usually it is not distinct at all. The margin of the clypeus is distinctly notched, and the "throat" has only one distinct but shallow curving line near its forward edge. In males, a single wide row of file-like structures for producing squeaking sounds is present on the rear neck. There is a spine below the cheeks on each side of the head, near the base of which there starts a patch of glandular ducts which extend to the prothorax. The antennae are fairly short, reaching only to the middle of the pronotum; seen from above, their attachment points are hidden by the sides of the head. The first segment of the antenna is elongated, the second about 20% shorter. Antenna segments 3-10 are of almost equal length, the outer ones (3 and 6) slightly longer, the central ones (6-7) somewhat shorter. Antenna segments 9-11 are widened to form "club", with the last segment cone-shaped and longest of all – half again as long as the first, and 3 times as long as segment 9. The bead-like rounded margin of the labrum is only weakly developed. A line or ridge runs across the mentum of the labium.

Body
The prothorax is about half again as wide as it is long, with a pronotum which is markedly wider in the back than in the straight front – around 0.66 (0.62-0.68) mm wide by 0.71 (0.63-0.85) mm long. Its roughly parallel sides are not expanded at the rims, but instead bear 6 evenly-distributed more or less pointed teeth (including the rear corners). In each of these teeth, the rounded edge forms a bead-like rim which contains a small glandular duct. Impressions may or may not be present on the base of the pronotum, and it is as densely covered with punctures as the "throat". The cavities where the foreleg coxae attach are closed all around, and the rear margin of the prosternal process is straight.

On the mesosternum, there are distinct and well-developed rests for the foreleg coxae. The mesosternum also has a process which is pointed to the rear, and a row of clearly visible punctures, which form an indistinct line with their forward edges and each bear a bristle; such a feature is found in the presumed close relatives Empocryptus and Lobosternum, but also in some less closely related genera such as Cathartocryptus. The epimeres of the mesothorax' pleura have an indistinct pit. The joint between meso- and metasternum has an internal double knob, as is typical for most of its relatives (but also for some less closely related pleasing fungus beetles, such as Languriinae). On the metasternum, there are subcoxal lines as well as a lengthwise line in the center, and its endosternite has muscle attachment plates projecting inside the body cavity.

The ventrite of the first abdominal segment has subcoxal lines and 7-9 support structures. Abdominal ventrite 2 has 6-9 of these, while ventrites 3 and 4 have 4-6 support structures. The tergites of abdominal segment 7 and on protrude beyond the elytra tips. The abdomen of all adult Lepidotoramus, unlike in males of the presumed close relatives Empocryptus and Lobosternum, appears to lack scattered hairless glandular pores. However, in all three, unlike in some more distantly related genera, females lack a tooth in the middle of abdominal ventrite 5. The male genitalia have an aedeagus with a single elongate strut which at its forward end splits into two like in Empocryptus, and like in all its presumed relatives the tip of the stylus of the female genitalia inserts on the sternites of abdominal segment 9 which surround the vulva. The bulging spermatheca has a sclerotized duct like at least in Empocryptus (in Lobosternum it is unknown).

Wings and legs
The elytra are around 2.48 (2.11-2.93) times as long as the pronotum, and their length is around 1.42 (1.37-1.69) times the maximal width. They bear moderately long hairs which curl downwards; they have well-visible fine lengthwise stripes formed by the small punctuations; in between the lines the punctures are randomly and more loosely strewn, up to 5 times their diameter apart. A scutellary stripe is lacking. The parchment-like hindwings have a radial cell; the weakly-developed submedial spot is not contacted by wing vein CuA2+3+4+AA1+2. The tibiae are bent, conspicuously so in large individuals. On the forelegs, the outer margins of the tibiae bear a patch of small spines, while the inner margins bear tiny bumps. The segments of the tarsi carry lobes on the underside, and in males, the fore- and mid-leg tarsi have modified bristles.

== Relationships, range and ecology ==
About its ecology, very little is known, except that it is a tropical species. The genus Empocryptus (including Pseudhenoticus) has been suggested to be the closest known relative of Lepidotoramus, and the monotypic genus Lobosternum, endemic to Chile, as the closest relative of the proposed Empocryptus-Lepidotoramus clade. These, and perhaps some other less-studied beetles, would make up the tribe Empocryptini if this is considered valid.

The L.grouvellei holotype is old specimen in Grouvelle's collection, a female now at the MNHN that had been sourced from Bahia State (eastern Brazil) by Hans Fruhstorfer. Noted in the Paris museum in 1917, its precise collection locality and date are unknown. The paratypes are 15 additional Fruhstorfer specimens – shared between the MNHN Grouvelle and the Richard Leschen collections – with the same vague location data as the holotype, as well as 14 specimens collected by E.Corriazo in the first week of December 1988, in the eastern Ecuadorian lowlands (Cuyabeno Wildlife Reserve in Orellana Province, 230 meters AMSL).

The Ecuadorian specimens, originally deposited in the Pontifical Catholic University of Ecuador beetle collection, but later shared with collections in the USA and New Zealand, were originally found within a lepidopteran pupa that was itself encased in a silken cocoon. The pupa had four holes which seem to have been caused by emerging endoparasites which would have eaten out and killed the developing lepidopteran – judging from the molted caterpillar skin found in the cocoon, a Noctuidae (owlet moth). While it might seem that Lepidotoramus larvae were the parasites (or parasitoids) in question, such a behavior would be unprecedented in Erotylidae, and rather exceptional in beetles in general. However, the similarly singular and monotypic genus Zavaljus from the eastern Baltic Sea region, a xenosceline pleasing fungus beetle not otherwise close to Lepidotoramus, is suspected to be a kleptoparasite on the paralyzed arthropods which Crabronidae parasitoid wasps dump in abandoned longhorn beetle breeding tunnels to feed their larvae, proving that some highly divergent feeding strategies exist among Erotylidae. More likely, Lepidotoramus are mycophagous like the other empocryptine (or cryptophiline) beetles for which feeding habits are known; in this case, they could have been attracted to molds growing on the decaying remains of the pupa. The beetle specimens were also fully grown, but no note was made of beetle larval skins in the cocoon. It is also unknown whether Fruhstorfer's specimens were collected in eastern Brazil, or simply provided by a trader based there; it is thus still unresolved whether L.grouvellei occurs throughout the entire Amazon Basin over a distance of about 4,000 km, or is a restricted-range endemic species of the Aguarico River basin in Ecuadorian Amazonia.
