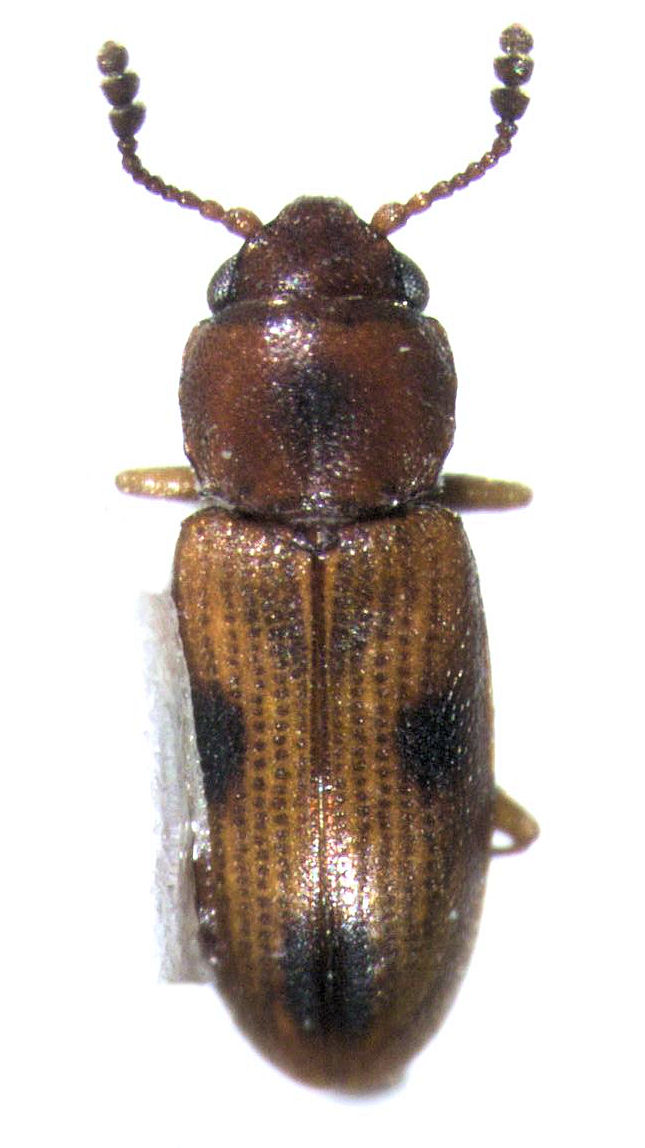
- Cathartocryptus maculosus adult from Mount Pirongia, New Zealand

Scientific classification
- Kingdom: Animalia
- Phylum: Arthropoda
- Clade: Pancrustacea
- Class: Insecta
- Order: Coleoptera
- Suborder: Polyphaga
- Infraorder: Cucujiformia
- Family: Erotylidae
- Genus: Cathartocryptus; Sharp, 1886

Type species
- Cathartocryptus obscurus Sharp, 1886

Synonyms
- Xenoscelinus Grouvelle, 1910

= Cathartocryptus =

Genus of beetle

Cathartocryptus is a small genus of pleasing fungus beetle (family Erotylidae). This genus is mainly found on the western side of the Pacific Ocean, inhabiting places such as Japan, Taiwan, Australia and New Zealand. However, it has also been recorded from Africa. Most members of this genus were placed in a distinct genus Xenoscelinus for most of the 20th century.

Some authors place Cathartocryptus in tribe Cryptophilini of subfamily Cryptophilinae, others accept fewer subfamilies in the Erotylidae and place the Cryptophilini in subfamily Xenoscelinae. But Cathartocryptus and some of its presumed closest relatives (Loberoschema, Stengita, and perhaps Crowsonguptus) differ somewhat from more typical Cryptophilini; they have some similarities to the Tritominae (or Tritomini) which are closer to Erotylidae than to Cryptophilinae, and might actually belong there. Earlier authors often placed these beetles into a distinct tribe Xenoscelinini of the lizard beetles, at that time held to be a distinct family Languriidae but actually was paraphyletic with Erotylidae and eventually was merged into it. Similarly, the Xenoscelinini were eventually merged into the Cryptophilini.

== Description ==
Cathartocryptus adults are small brownish beetles with a flattened body and antennae which end in conspicuous "clubs".

Head and body
On the head, there is a straight suture across the "throat"; file-like structures on the neck for producing squeaking sounds, unlike in many other Erotylidae, are absent. The prothorax is longer than wide and keeled; unlike in most other Cryptophilini, the keel is smooth. The cavities where the foreleg coxae attach are open at the back, and the rear margin of the prosternal process is straight. On the mesosternum, there are no distinct rests for the foreleg coxae; this separates Cathartocryptus and its presumed closest relatives from the core group of the Cryptophilini which have either well-developed coxal rests or at least a V-shaped ridge. The mesosternum also has a process which is pointed to the rear, and has a row of clearly visible punctures, which form a line with their forward edges and each bear a bristle. The joint between meso- and metasternum does not have a double knob. On the metasternum, there are no subcoxal lines, and its endosternite has muscle attachment plates projecting inside the body cavity. On the abdomen, there are no scattered glandular pores.

Wings and legs
The elytra have irregularly scattered punctuations and bear hairs which point backwards and lie flat against the surface (in many Cryptophilini, these hairs are curled downwards). On the parchment-like hindwings, the radial cell is present, as is a submedial dot which meets wing vein CuA2+3+4+AA1+2; the latter trait is characteristic for Cathartocryptus and its presumed closest relatives, whereas in other Cryptophilini this vein does not contact the submedial dot. The foreleg tibiae have a smooth and unornamented outer margin.

== Nomenclature and taxonomy ==
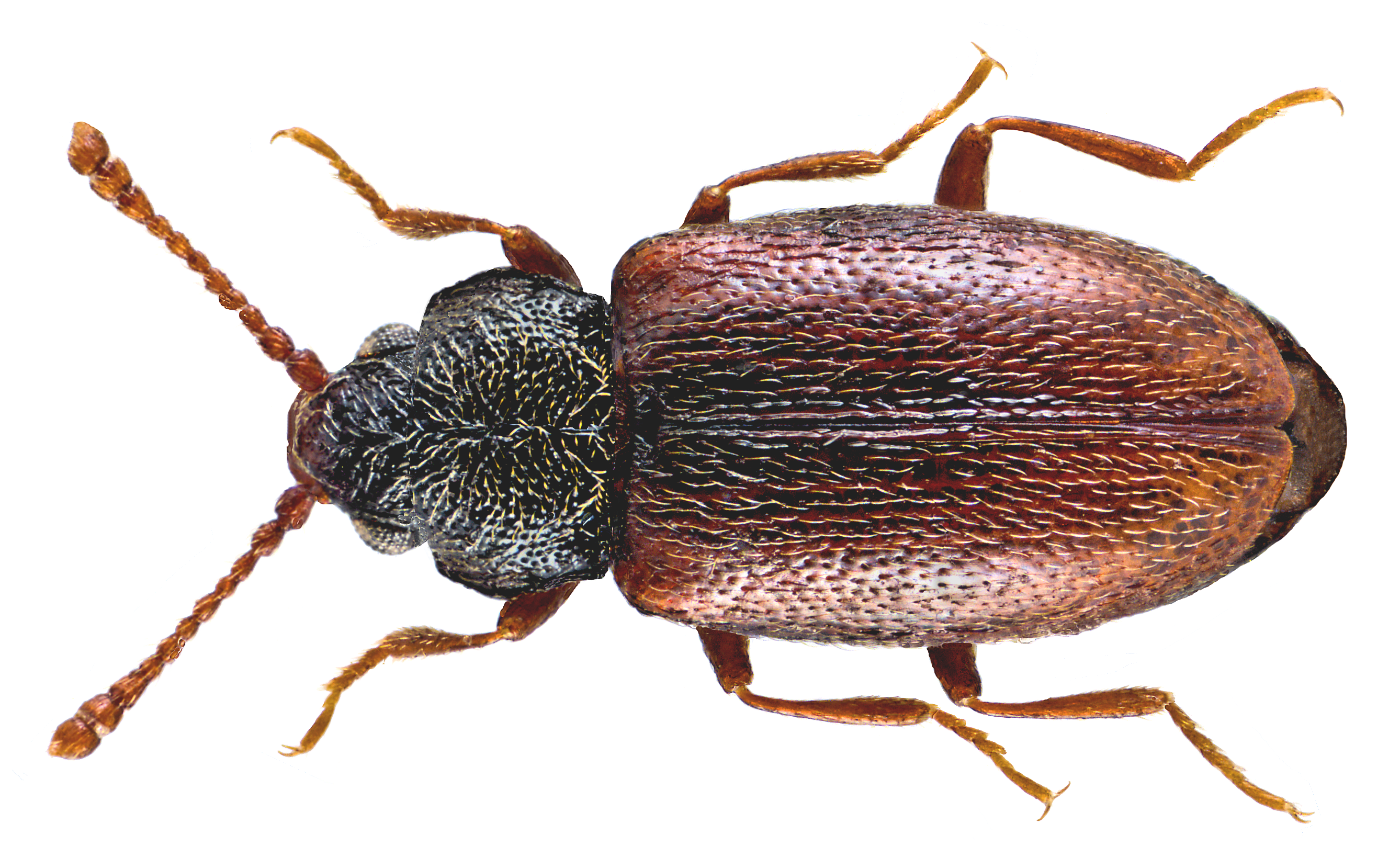
Paramecosoma melanocephalum from Germany, which Thomas Broun erroneously believed to be a close ally of C.maculosus

The type species of this genus is C.maculosus, endemic to the North and Three Kings Islands of New Zealand. However, when English entomologist David Sharp established Cathartocryptus in 1886, he believed the single species he placed therein to be his own new discovery, and named it Cathartocryptus obscurus. He did not realize that five years earlier already, New Zealander Thomas Broun had described the same species in his Manual of the New Zealand Coleoptera as a supposed member of genus Paramecosoma in family Cryptophagidae (silken fungus beetles) under the name P.maculosa.

Meanwhile, Frenchman Antoine Grouvelle in 1910 established genus Xenoscelinus for a Southeast Asian species he named X.malaicus. He, and later authors, added more species to this genus. By the mid-20th century, there was growing suspicion that "P."maculosa was actually a pleasing fungus beetle and congener of X.malaicus. The merging of Xenoscelinus into Cathartocryptus was formalized in 1998.

Post-merge, Cathartocryptus contains 8 species:

- Cathartocryptus ater (Grouvelle, 1914)
- Cathartocryptus australiensis (Sen Gupta & Crowson, 1971)
- Cathartocryptus concolor (Grouvelle, 1916)
- Cathartocryptus hiranoi (Sasaji, 1989)
- Cathartocryptus maculosus (Broun, 1881)
- Cathartocryptus malaicus (Grouvelle, 1910)
- Cathartocryptus tasmanicus (Grouvelle, 1911)
