= Lobosternum =

Scientific classification
- Kingdom: Animalia
- Phylum: Arthropoda
- Clade: Pancrustacea
- Class: Insecta
- Order: Coleoptera
- Suborder: Polyphaga
- Infraorder: Cucujiformia
- Family: Erotylidae
- Genus: Lobosternum; Reitter, 1875
- Species: L. clavicorne

Binomial name
- Lobosternum clavicorne Reitter, 1875

Genus of beetle

Lobosternum is a monotypic genus of the pleasing fungus beetles (family Erotylidae). It was established by Edmund Reitter in 1875 to contain the diminutive species Lobosternum clavicorne from Chile.

Some authors place this genus in tribe Empocryptini of subfamily Cryptophilinae, others accept fewer subfamilies in the Erotylidae and place Lobosternum in tribe Cryptophilini or Empocryptini of subfamily Xenoscelinae. Earlier authors usually allied Lobosternum with the lizard beetles, at that time held to be a distinct family Languriidae, wherein Lobosternum was placed in subfamily Toraminae. But the "Languriidae" was actually paraphyletic with Erotylidae and eventually was merged into it.

== Description ==
L. clavicorne adults are tiny beetles, only 1.4–1.8 mm long, oval and parallel-sided in shape, with a rounded back, and antennae which end in conspicuous loose "clubs". They are blackish-brown all over, with an indistinct lighter spot on the "shoulders" of each elytron.

Head
On the head, there is a weak but distinct straight line across the "throat", and the clypeus has a distinct straight margin but no suture where it meets the "forehead". A single wide row of file-like structures for producing squeaking sounds is present on the rear neck in all adults, with no sexual difference. There is a spine below the cheeks on each side of the head, near the base of which there starts a patch of glandular ducts which extend to the prothorax. Seen from above, the attachment points of the antennae are hidden by the sides of the head. The impressed lines above the hairy compound eyes and the bead-like rounded margin of the labrum are only weakly developed. A line or ridge runs across the mentum of the labium.

Body
The prothorax is wider than long, with a pronotum which is only slightly wider in the back than in the inward-bent front, with roughly parallel sides; the latter are not expanded at the rims but instead bear 6 evenly-distributed teeth (including the rear corners). In each of these teeth, the rounded edge forms a bead-like rim which contains a small glandular duct. Impressions may or may not be present on the base of the pronotum. The cavities where the foreleg coxae attach are closed all around, and the rear margin of the prosternal process is notched. On the mesosternum, there are distinct and well-developed rests for the foreleg coxae. The mesosternum also has a parallel-sided process, and a row of clearly visible punctures, which form an indistinct line with their forward edges and each bear a bristle; at least in some specimens this punctured line is clearly interrupted in the middle. The epimeres of the mesothorax' pleura have an indistinct pit. The joint between meso- and metasternum has an internal double knob, as is typical for most of its relatives (but also for some less closely related pleasing fungus beetles, such as Languriinae). On the metasternum, there are subcoxal lines as well as a lengthwise line in the center, and its endosternite has muscle attachment plates projecting inside the body cavity.

The ventrite of the first abdominal segment has subcoxal lines and two support structures. Abdominal ventrites 3 and 4 likewise have two support structures, but the second abdominal ventrite has four of these. The tergite of abdominal segment 7 is hidden under the elytra. On the abdomen of the males, there are scattered hairless glandular pores like in the presumed close relative Empocryptus, while in females, the abdominal ventrite 5 lacks a tooth in the middle. The male genitalia have an aedeagus with a single elongate strut, and like in its presumed relatives the tip of the stylus of the female genitalia inserts on the sternites of abdominal segment 9 which surround the vulva.

Wings and legs
The elytra bear short hairs which point backwards and lie flat against the surface; they have fine lengthwise stripes formed by small punctuations, but these are only well-visible in the central area of the wing. A scutellary stripe is lacking. The parchment-like hindwings have a weakly-developed submedial spot; they are reduced to a narrow strip, probably rendering this beetle unable to fly. The tibiae are almost parallel-sided, with smooth and unornamented margins. The segments of the tarsi carry lobes on the underside, and in males, the fore- and mid-leg tarsi have modified bristles.

== Relationships, distribution and ecology ==
Most likely, L. clavicorne is the closest living relative of a clade formed by the genera Empocryptus and Lepidotoramus. These three genera are found mainly in South America, with the present species being the only member of the group that does not occur in tropical areas. Instead, it occurs in the temperate regions of southern Chile. Analysis of its gut contents revealed only indeterminable detritus.
