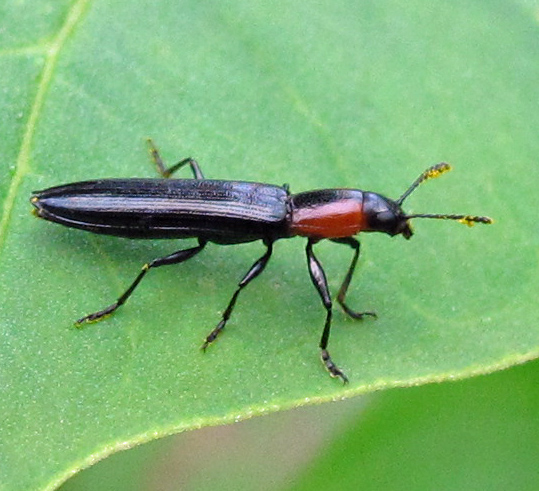
- Adult, Wheatley, Ontario, Canada

Scientific classification
- Kingdom: Animalia
- Phylum: Arthropoda
- Clade: Pancrustacea
- Class: Insecta
- Order: Coleoptera
- Suborder: Polyphaga
- Infraorder: Cucujiformia
- Family: Erotylidae
- Genus: Acropteroxys
- Species: A. gracilis

Binomial name
- Acropteroxys gracilis (Newman, 1838)

Synonyms
- Languria divisa Horn, 1885; Languria gracilis Newman, 1838

= Acropteroxys gracilis =

Species of beetle

Acropteroxys gracilis, the slender lizard beetle, is a species of lizard beetle in the pleasing fungus beetle family (Erotylidae). It is found in Central America and North America, including into Canada.

With a body length range of 6-12mm, adults of this species are narrower and shorter than its only North American congener A. lecontei.

Sometimes, A.gracilis (under its original name Languria gracilis) is cited as type species of Acropteroxys. This is based on the explicit type designation by Henry Gorham after he had established the genus. However, Gorham had already made A.caudatus the type species at the genus' inception, rendering his subsequent designation of A.gracilis invalid.

== Ecology ==
A.gracilis is a stem-boring species reported to feed upon ragweed species such as Ambrosia artemisiifolia. Members of the plant genus Ambrosia are serious agricultural pests and a public-health concern due to causing severe hayfever; thus Acropteroxys gracilis has been investigated for potential use as a biocontrol agent. However, A. gracilis turned itself out to be a pest species due to its highly polyphagous habits: apart from Ambrosia, it infests Trifolium pratense (red clover), Medicago sativa (alfalfa) and Melilotus (sweet clover), as well as a number of other plants in the families Asteraceae (e.g. Conyza and Erigeron fleabanes), Poaceae, and Urticaceae (e.g. common nettle Urtica dioica).
