= Languria convexicollis =

Scientific classification
- Domain: Eukaryota
- Kingdom: Animalia
- Phylum: Arthropoda
- Class: Insecta
- Order: Coleoptera
- Suborder: Polyphaga
- Infraorder: Cucujiformia
- Family: Erotylidae
- Genus: Languria
- Species: L. convexicollis

Binomial name
- Languria convexicollis Horn, 1868

Species of beetle

Languria convexicollis is a species of lizard beetle in the family Erotylidae. It is found in Central America and North America.
