= Dasydactylus =

Scientific classification
- Kingdom: Animalia
- Phylum: Arthropoda
- Clade: Pancrustacea
- Class: Insecta
- Order: Coleoptera
- Suborder: Polyphaga
- Infraorder: Cucujiformia
- Family: Erotylidae
- Tribe: Languriini
- Genus: Dasydactylus; Gorham, 1887

Type species
- Dasydactylus buprestoides Gorham, 1887

Genus of beetles

Dasydactylus is an American genus in the pleasing fungus beetle family (Erotylidae). They belong to the lizard beetle tribe Languriini of subfamily Languriinae; formerly, their subfamily was considered a distinct family, and their tribe up-ranked to subfamily status, whereas some recent authors prefer to merge Languriinae into subfamily Erotylinae.

The roughly 25-30 members of this genus are essentially restricted to Central America, with only one species ranging north into southernmost Texas and a few records from northern Colombia. They are small beetles, about one-quarter to half an inch long (6-10 mm), with an elongated and slender shape, blackish with a metallic sheen, and in some species contrasting red areas.

Species in this genus include:

- Dasydactylus aeneopiceus Gorham, 1898
- Dasydactylus buprestoides Gorham, 1887
- Dasydactylus chalceus (Crotch)
- Dasydactylus cnici Schaeffer, 1904
- Dasydactylus glabricollis Gorham
- Dasydactylus puncticeps Gorham
- Dasydactylus sellatus (Crotch)

Dasydactylus nitidus and D.ventralis are synonyms of Langurites lineatus, while the nomen nudum "Dasydactylus rubioanea" refers to a specimen of Goniolanguria latipes.
