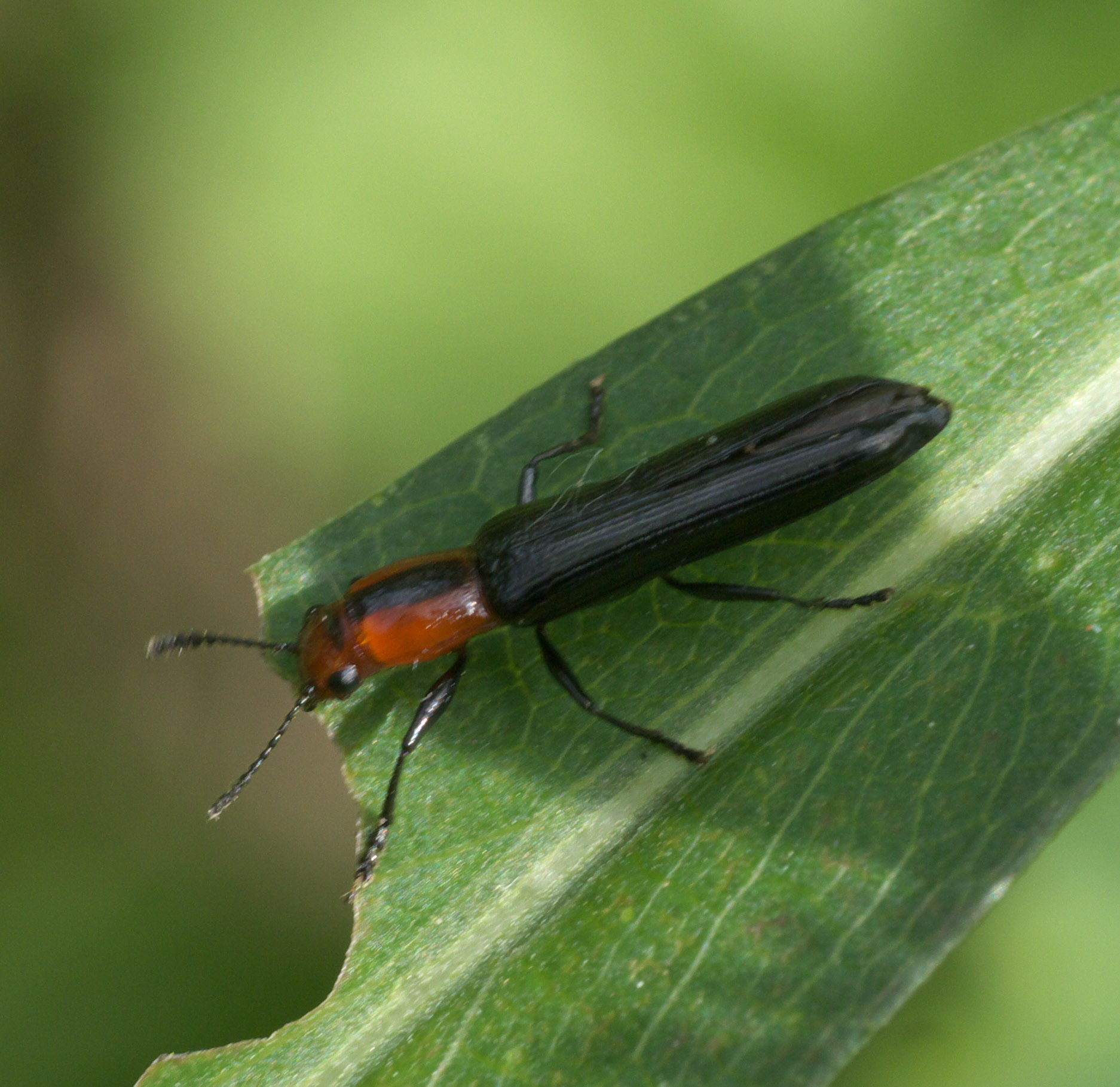
- Acropteroxys gracilis, adult at Pryor Creek, Oklahoma, USA

Scientific classification
- Kingdom: Animalia
- Phylum: Arthropoda
- Clade: Pancrustacea
- Class: Insecta
- Order: Coleoptera
- Suborder: Polyphaga
- Infraorder: Cucujiformia
- Family: Erotylidae
- Tribe: Languriini
- Genus: Acropteroxys; Gorham, 1887

Type species
- Acropteryx caudatus Gorham, 1887

= Acropteroxys =

Genus of beetles

Acropteroxys is a small American genus in the pleasing fungus beetle family (Erotylidae). They belong to the lizard beetle tribe Languriini of subfamily Languriinae; formerly, their subfamily was considered a distinct family, and their tribe upranked to subfamily status, whereas some recent authors prefer to merge Languriinae into subfamily Erotylinae. This genus occurs in North America east of the Rocky Mountains, as well as Central America. Of the handful of species, one ranges as far north as Canada, but most inhabit Neotropical regions.

This genus is presumed to be most closely related to Langurites.

== Description and ecology ==
These beetles are one-quarter to half an inch long (around 1 cm). They are slim and generally blackish with some red on the pronotum, as is typical for their tribe; the 4 or 5 segments at the tops of their antennae are expanded to a club shape. The pronotum has straight sides and is covered in coarse shallow punctures; the elytra tips are smooth and rounded.

Found on the edges of forests and along roads, Acropteroxys adults are active in spring and summer in the cooler parts of the genus' range, but probably year-round in the tropical regions. Like in their closest relatives (but unlike the vast majority of pleasing fungus beetles), Acropteroxys larvae are stem-borers in herbaceous plants; the adults eat pollen and leaves.

== Species ==
Sometimes, A.gracilis (under its original name Languria gracilis) is cited as type species of this genus. This is based on the explicit type designation by Henry Gorham after he had established the genus. However, Gorham had already made A.caudatus the type species at the genus' inception, rendering his subsequent designation of A.gracilis invalid.

Six species of Acropteroxys are accepted as of 2025:

- Acropteroxys acuminatus
- Acropteroxys caudatus Gorham, 1887
- Acropteroxys cervantesi Mora-Aguilar & Delgado, 2023
- Acropteroxys gracilis (Newman, 1838) (slender lizard beetle)
- Acropteroxys lecontei (Crotch, 1873)
- Acropteroxys trifasciatus
