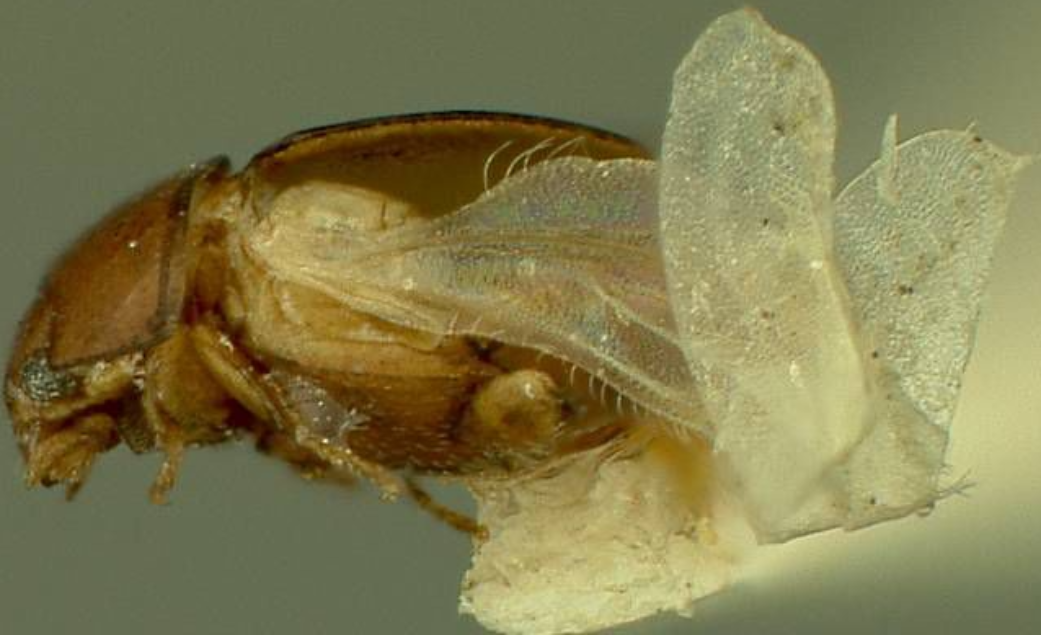
- Holotype specimen

Scientific classification
- Kingdom: Animalia
- Phylum: Arthropoda
- Class: Insecta
- Order: Coleoptera
- Suborder: Polyphaga
- Infraorder: Cucujiformia
- Family: Eupsilobiidae
- Genus: Eidoreus
- Species: E. politus

Binomial name
- Eidoreus politus (Casey, 1895)

= Eidoreus politus =

Species of beetle

Eidoreus politus is a species of beetle in the family Eupsilobiidae. It is found in Central America and North America.
