= Languria trifasciata =

Scientific classification
- Kingdom: Animalia
- Phylum: Arthropoda
- Clade: Pancrustacea
- Class: Insecta
- Order: Coleoptera
- Suborder: Polyphaga
- Infraorder: Cucujiformia
- Family: Erotylidae
- Genus: Languria
- Species: L. trifasciata

Binomial name
- Languria trifasciata Say, 1823

Species of beetle

Languria trifasciata is a species of lizard beetle in the family Erotylidae. It is found in North America.
