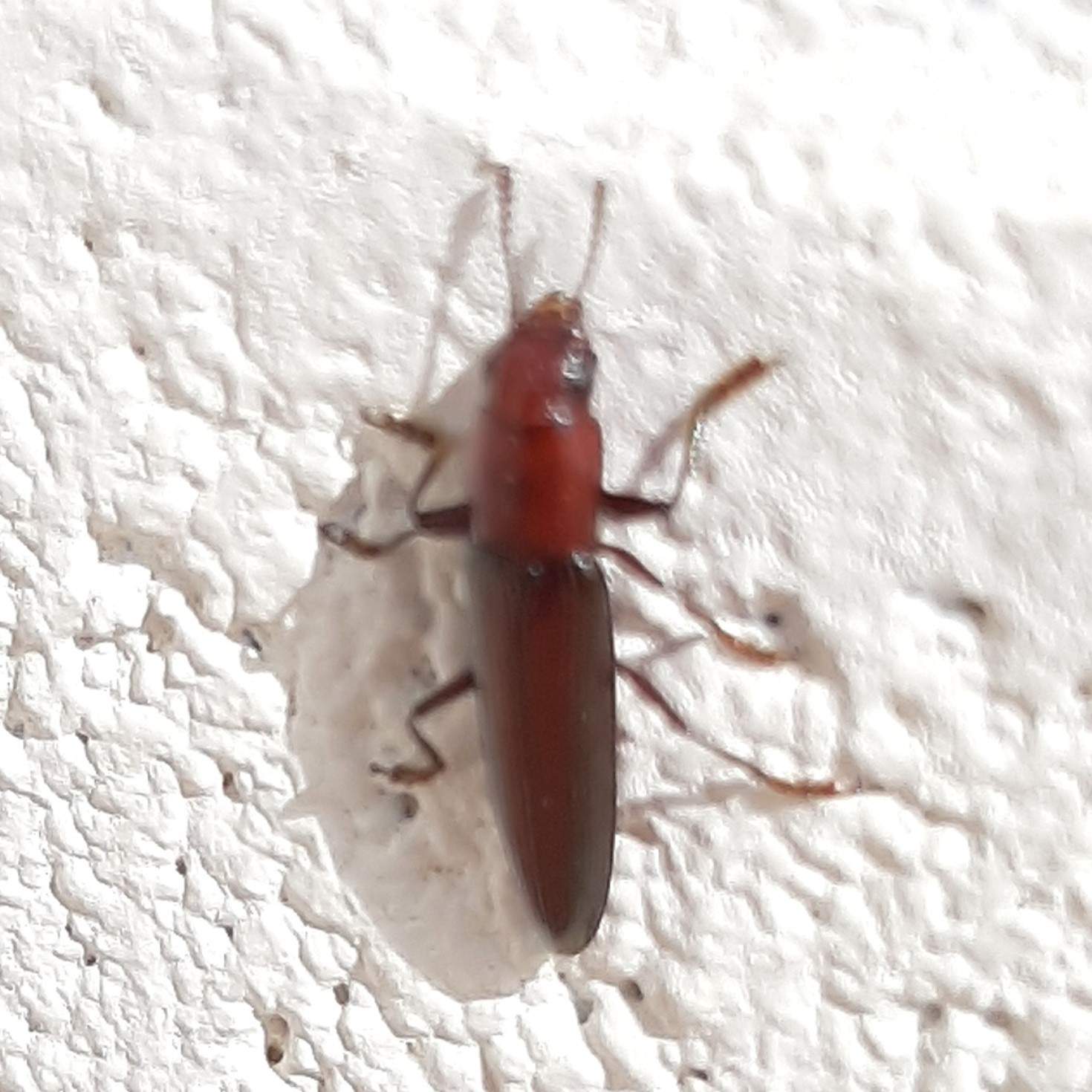
- Adult in San Bernard NWR, Texas

Scientific classification
- Kingdom: Animalia
- Phylum: Arthropoda
- Clade: Pancrustacea
- Class: Insecta
- Order: Coleoptera
- Suborder: Polyphaga
- Infraorder: Cucujiformia
- Family: Erotylidae
- Genus: Languria
- Species: L. taedata

Binomial name
- Languria taedata LeConte, 1854

Synonyms
- Languria erythrocephala Blatchley, 1924; Languria erythrocephalus (lapsus); Languria rufiventris Motschulsky 1860

= Languria taedata =

Species of beetle

Languria taedata is a species of lizard beetle (tribe Languriini within the family Erotylidae, the pleasing fungus beetles). It is found in North America, especially along the eastern coastal states.

Dark and elongate, adults are 9mm to 11mm long. They occur in three color morphs which initially were believed to be distinct species.

Its larvae burrow inside the stems of various Poaceae grasses, namely Panicum hemitomon (maidencane), Sporobolus alterniflorus (smooth cordgrass), and Urochloa mutica (para grass).
