= Thallisellini =

Scientific classification
- Kingdom: Animalia
- Phylum: Arthropoda
- Clade: Pancrustacea
- Class: Insecta
- Order: Coleoptera
- Suborder: Polyphaga
- Infraorder: Cucujiformia
- Family: Erotylidae
- Subfamily: Languriinae
- Tribe: Thallisellini; Sen Gupta, 1968

Tribe of beetle

Thallisellini is a small tribe of pleasing fungus beetles (family Erotylidae) in the subfamily Languriinae.

About two dozen species in 4 genera are placed in this tribe. They are found in the Neotropics.

== Taxonomy ==
Formerly, when the Languriinae were still considered a distinct and more encompassing family, some Thallisellini were placed in tribe Loberini of subfamily Xenoscelinae.

The tribe contains the following genera:

- Acryptophagus Grouvelle, 1919
- Platoberus Sharp, 1900
- Pseudhapalips Champion, 1913 (= Pseudohapalips)
- Thallisella Crotch, 1875 (= Thalasiella, Thalisella)

In addition to the living members of Thallisellini, two prehistoric genera described from fossils are also placed here:

- † Serramorphus Lyubarsky & Perkovsky, 2017
- † Thallisellites Kupryjanowicz, Lyubarsky & Perkovsky, 2022
