= Languria denticulata =

Scientific classification
- Domain: Eukaryota
- Kingdom: Animalia
- Phylum: Arthropoda
- Class: Insecta
- Order: Coleoptera
- Suborder: Polyphaga
- Infraorder: Cucujiformia
- Family: Erotylidae
- Genus: Languria
- Species: L. denticulata

Binomial name
- Languria denticulata Schaeffer, 1918

Species of beetle

Languria denticulata is a species of lizard beetle in the family Erotylidae. It is found in North America.
