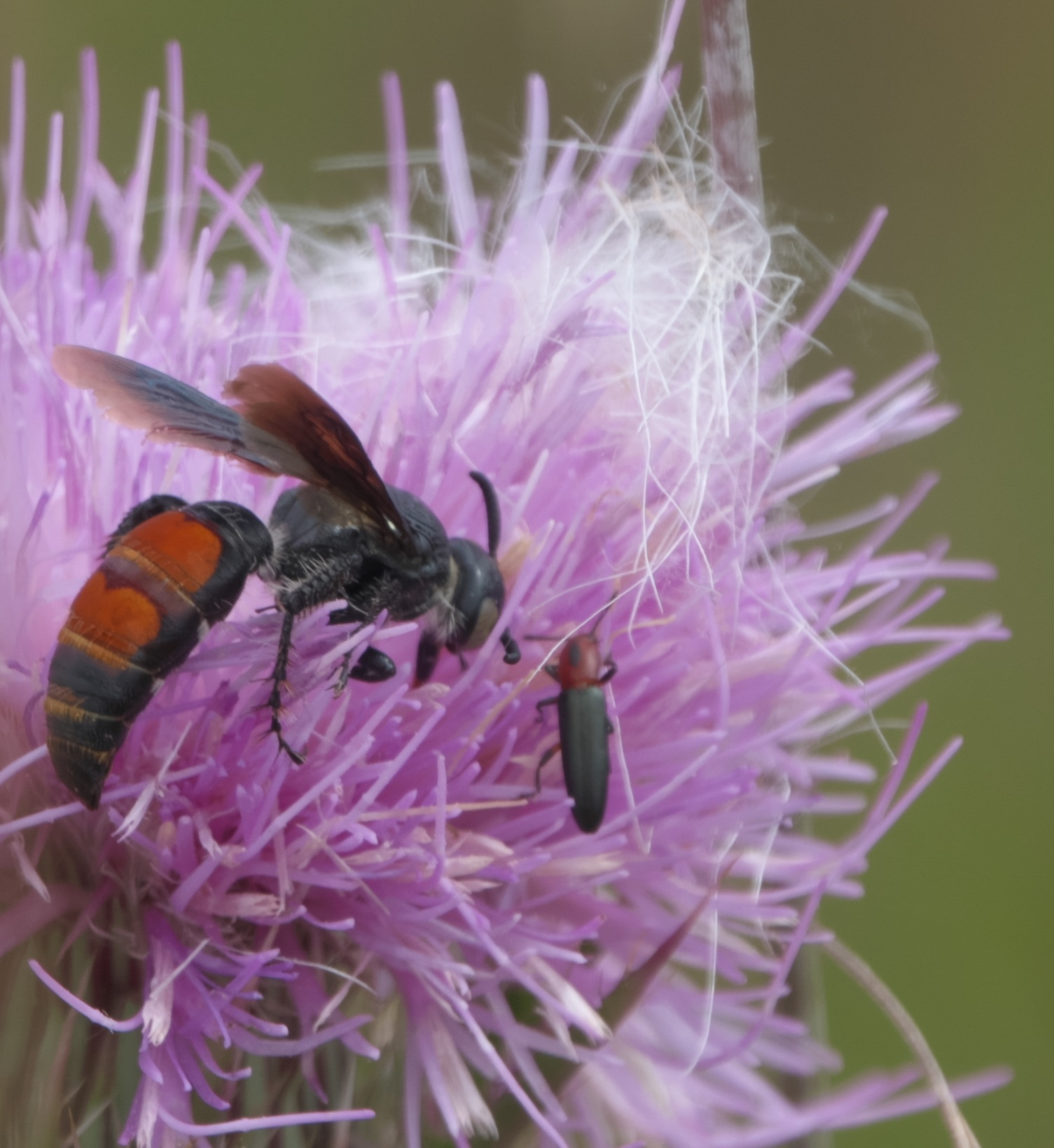
- Languria discoidea, the small beetle in front of the wasp, Florida

Scientific classification
- Domain: Eukaryota
- Kingdom: Animalia
- Phylum: Arthropoda
- Class: Insecta
- Order: Coleoptera
- Suborder: Polyphaga
- Infraorder: Cucujiformia
- Family: Erotylidae
- Genus: Languria
- Species: L. discoidea

Binomial name
- Languria discoidea LeConte, 1854

= Languria discoidea =

Species of beetle

Languria discoidea is a species of lizard beetle in the family Erotylidae. It is found in Florida and the southeastern United States.
