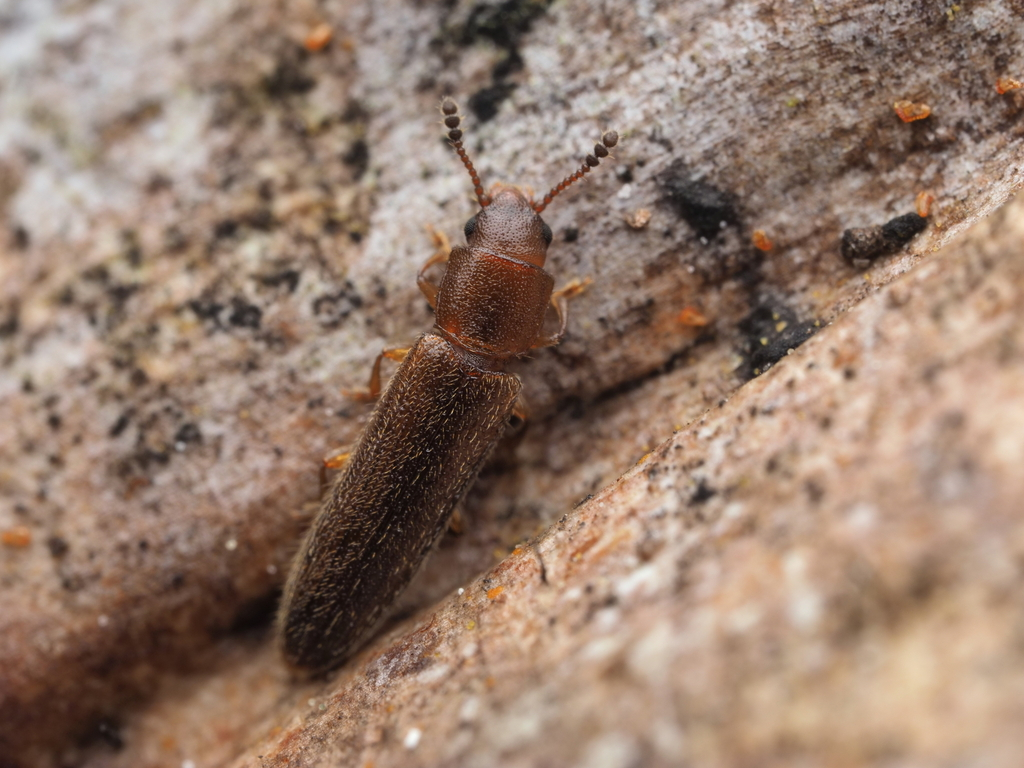
- Hapalips prolixus in Auckland, New Zealand

Scientific classification
- Kingdom: Animalia
- Phylum: Arthropoda
- Clade: Pancrustacea
- Class: Insecta
- Order: Coleoptera
- Suborder: Polyphaga
- Infraorder: Cucujiformia
- Family: Erotylidae
- Subfamily: Languriinae
- Tribe: Hapalipini; Leschen, 2003

= Hapalipini =

Tribe of beetle

Hapalipini is a tribe of pleasing fungus beetle in the subfamily Languriinae.

== Taxonomy ==
Hapalipini contains the following three genera:

- Bolerus Grouvelle, 1919 (=Thallisellodes)
- Hapalips Reitter, 1877
- Truquiella Champion, 1913 (may belong into Hapalips)
