= Languriomorpha =

Scientific classification
- Kingdom: Animalia
- Phylum: Arthropoda
- Clade: Pancrustacea
- Class: Insecta
- Order: Coleoptera
- Suborder: Polyphaga
- Infraorder: Cucujiformia
- Family: Erotylidae
- Subfamily: Languriinae
- Tribe: Languriini
- Genus: Languriomorpha; Gorham, 1887

Type species
- Languria lewisii Crotch, 1873

Genus of insects

Languriomorpha is a small genus of pleasing fungus beetles (family Erotylidae) in tribe Languriini of the "lizard beetle" subfamily Languriinae. Some authors subsume it in Pachylanguria.

A handful of Languriomorpha species spottily occur in the temperate Pacific coastal areas of East Asia almost to the Arctic:

- Languriomorpha kunashiriana Kôno, 1936
- Languriomorpha lewisii (Crotch, 1873)
- Languriomorpha nara (Lewis, 1884)
- Languriomorpha nigritarsis (Waterhouse, 1873)
- Languriomorpha yamamotoi (Miwa & Chûjô, 1937)
