= Acropteroxys lecontei =

Scientific classification
- Domain: Eukaryota
- Kingdom: Animalia
- Phylum: Arthropoda
- Class: Insecta
- Order: Coleoptera
- Suborder: Polyphaga
- Infraorder: Cucujiformia
- Family: Erotylidae
- Genus: Acropteroxys
- Species: A. lecontei

Binomial name
- Acropteroxys lecontei (Crotch, 1873)

Species of beetle

Acropteroxys lecontei is a species of lizard beetle in the family Erotylidae. It is found in North America.
