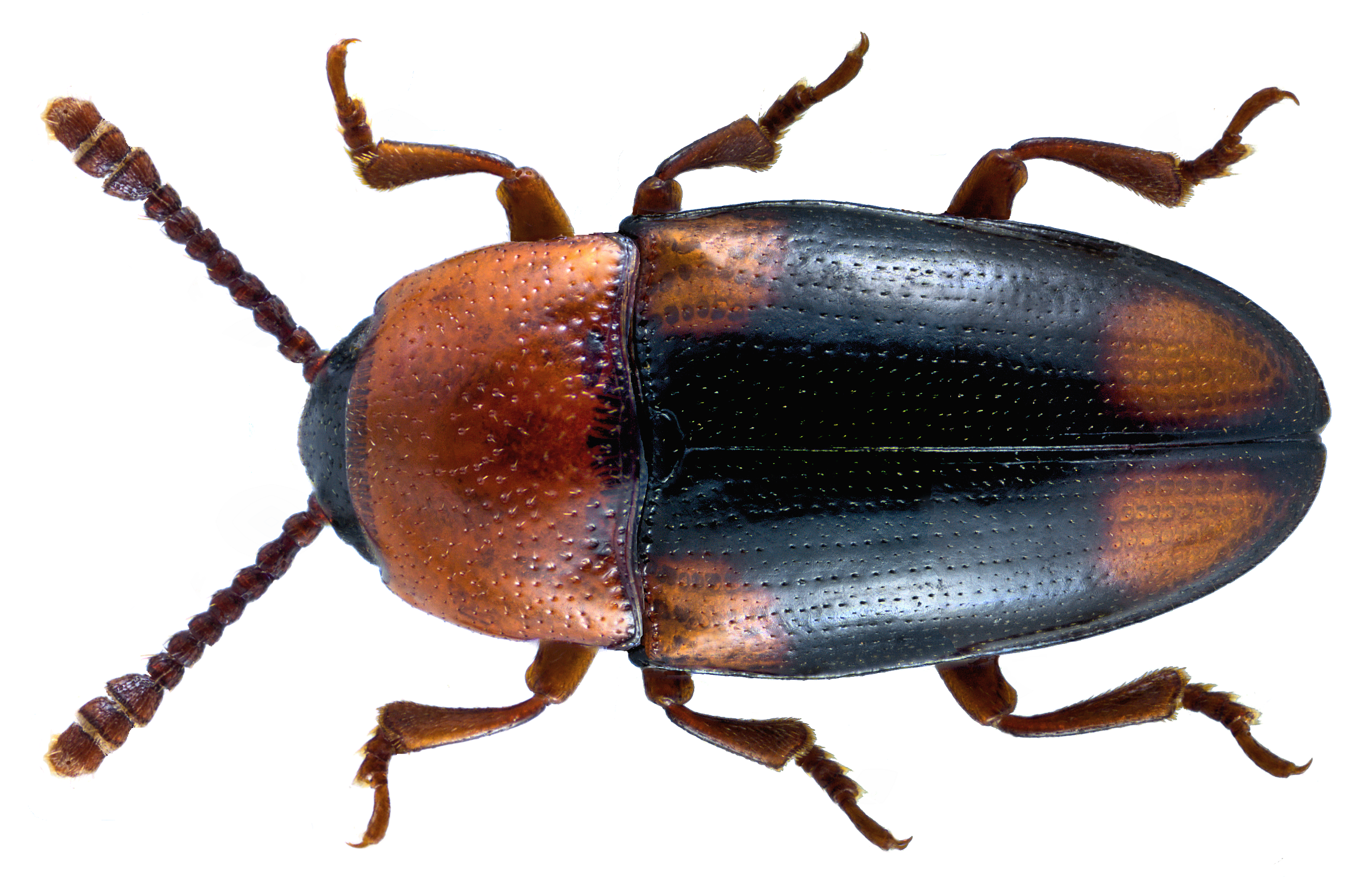
- Adult from Utzenfeld in the Black Forest

Scientific classification
- Kingdom: Animalia
- Phylum: Arthropoda
- Clade: Pancrustacea
- Class: Insecta
- Order: Coleoptera
- Suborder: Polyphaga
- Infraorder: Cucujiformia
- Family: Erotylidae
- Genus: Combocerus; Bedel, 1868
- Species: C. glaber

Binomial name
- Combocerus glaber (Schaller, 1783)

Synonyms
- Numerous, see text

= Combocerus =

Genus of beetles

Combocerus is a genus of the pleasing fungus beetles family (Erotylidae). Its only species is Combocerus glaber, which occurs in Europe up to the Urals and Caucasus. Within its family, it is placed in tribe Dacnini of subfamily Erotylinae, or in a distinct subfamily Dacninae if the Erotylinae are more narrowly circumscribed.

The genus was established by Ernest Bedel in 1868 for the European species first described as Silpha glaber by Johann Schaller in 1783 and erroneously affiliated with the carrion beetles due to it being attracted to dung and decaying plants on the ground. In the next years, other authors, assuming the species to be hitherto unknown, re-described it as a presumed bark beetle or skin beetle, until it was correctly identified as a pleasing fungus beetle in its re-description by Johann Friedrich Wilhelm Herbst in 1793.

The invalid synonyms this species has formerly been known under are:

- Combocerus fasciatus Kolenati, 1846
- Combocerus quadrimaculatus (Herbst, 1793)
- Combocerus quadripustulatus Panzer, 1793
- Combocerus sanguinicollis (Fabricius, 1787)
- Dermestes quadripustulatus Panzer, 1793
- Engis glaber (Schaller, 1783)
- Engis sanguinicollis (Fabricius, 1787)
- Ips sanguinicollis Fabricius, 1787
- Mycetophagus sanguinicollis (Fabricius, 1787)
- Silpha glaber Schaller, 1783
- Triplax quadrimaculatus Herbst, 1793
