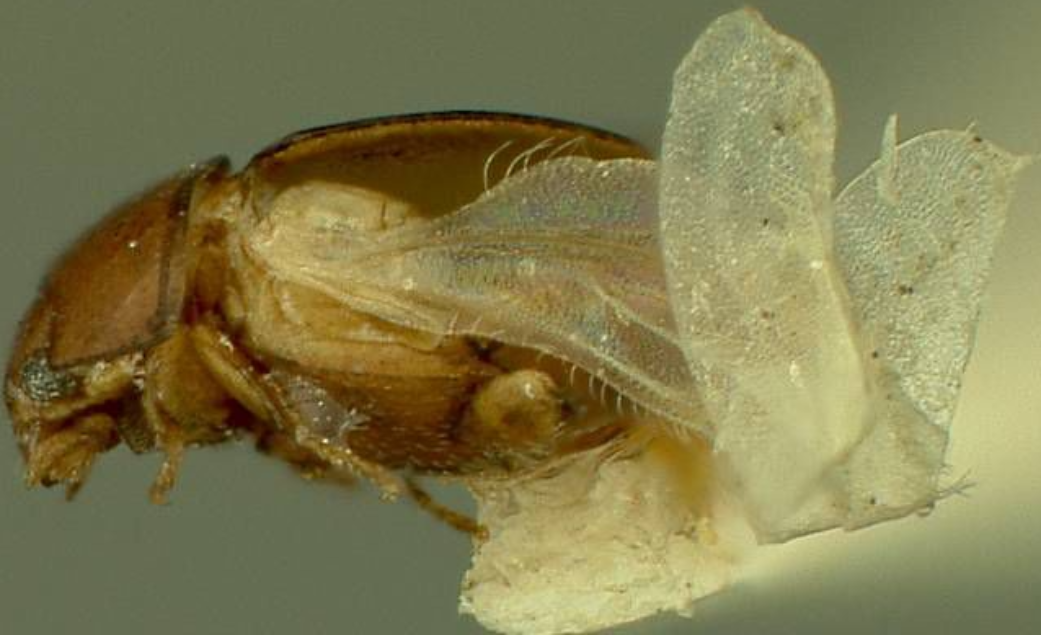

Scientific classification
- Kingdom: Animalia
- Phylum: Arthropoda
- Clade: Pancrustacea
- Class: Insecta
- Order: Coleoptera
- Suborder: Polyphaga
- Infraorder: Cucujiformia
- Family: Eupsilobiidae
- Genus: Eidoreus; Sharp, 1885

Synonyms
- Eupsilobius Casey, 1895

= Eidoreus =

Genus of beetles

Eidoreus is a genus of beetles in the family Eupsilobiidae, formerly placed in Endomychidae or Erotylidae. There are three described species in this genus.

This genus resembles certain Erotylidae, such as Thaumastodacne, in overall appearance. A remarkable trait of these genera is that the mesosternum is so reduced as to be invisible, with prosternum and metasternum being directly adjacent.

== Selected species ==
- Eidoreus minutus Sharp, 1885
- Eidoreus politus (Casey, 1895)
