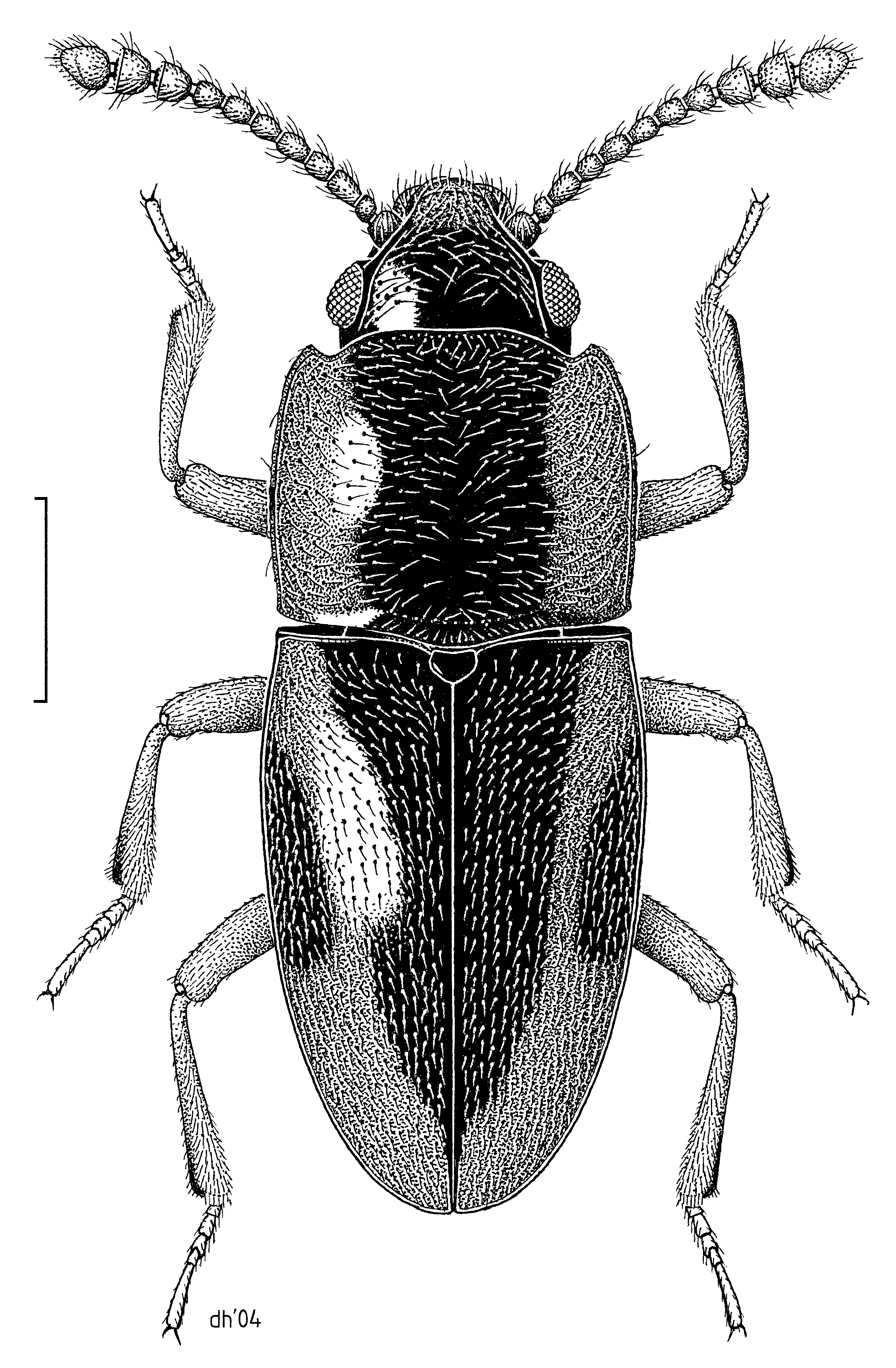
- Adult Cryptodacne synthetica drawing by Des Helmore

Scientific classification
- Kingdom: Animalia
- Phylum: Arthropoda
- Clade: Pancrustacea
- Class: Insecta
- Order: Coleoptera
- Suborder: Polyphaga
- Infraorder: Cucujiformia
- Family: Erotylidae
- Genus: Cryptodacne; Sharp, 1878

= Cryptodacne =

Genus of beetle

Cryptodacne is a genus of pleasing fungus beetle (family Erotylidae). in the subfamily Dacninae (or tribe Dacnini if the subfamily Erotylinae is more widely defined).

With their closest relatives, they share the traits of having antennae that are thickened at the end, an end segment of the maxillary palps that is not conspicuously widened, and a similar width of all the first three segments of the tarsi. They differ most obviously in the shape of their antennae – rather than consisting of a thin "stalk" and a thick "club" at the end as is usual among Erotylidae, Cryptodacne antennae gradually gradually widen towards the final segments which are wider than long.

== Taxonomy ==
Cryptodacne contains the following 4 described species:

- Cryptodacne nui Skelley & Leschen, 2007
- Cryptodacne rangiauria Skelley & Leschen, 2007
- Cryptodacne synthetica Sharp, 1878
- Cryptodacne vagepunctata Broun, 1883
