= Langurites =

Scientific classification
- Kingdom: Animalia
- Phylum: Arthropoda
- Clade: Pancrustacea
- Class: Insecta
- Order: Coleoptera
- Suborder: Polyphaga
- Infraorder: Cucujiformia
- Family: Erotylidae
- Tribe: Languriini
- Genus: Langurites; Motschulsky, 1860

Type species
- Languria lineata Laporte de Castelnau, 1832

Genus of beetles

Langurites is a small American genus in the pleasing fungus beetle family (Erotylidae). They belong to the lizard beetle tribe Languriini of subfamily Languriinae; formerly, their subfamily was considered a distinct family, and their tribe upranked to subfamily status, whereas some recent authors prefer to merge Languriinae into subfamily Erotylinae.

This genus is mostly found in Central America; it barely reaches northern Colombia and the southern USA (Arizona and Florida). Presumably closest to Acropteroxys, they are similarly blackish-and-red in color, but in Langurites the red coloration occurs on the sides of the pronotum and the elytra, with a black stripe running along the midline. Also, they can usually be distinguished from relatives occurring in the same region by the characteristic "toothed" wingtip shape.

== Species ==
Sometimes, Languria vitticollis is cited as type species of this genus. This is based on a designation by Patricia Vaurie in 1948, who noted that the original type species, Languria lineata, was not listed in the genus when this was established. However, L.vitticollis was synonymized with L.lineata when the latter was designated type species by George Crotch in 1876, making Vaurie's change unnecessary.

Many sources list only a single species, L.lineatus, which was historically described times and again as supposedly new, leading to a considerable number of junior synonyms. However, the genus appears to contain at least two valid species, and possibly more:

- Langurites apiciventris Casey
- Langurites lineatus (Laporte de Castelnau, 1832) (= L.infuscatus, "L.latitarsa" (nomen nudum), L.lineata (lapsus), L.scapularis, L.ventralis, L.vittatus, L.vitticollis)
- Langurites superciliatus Casey
- Langurites verticalis (Erichson, 1847)
