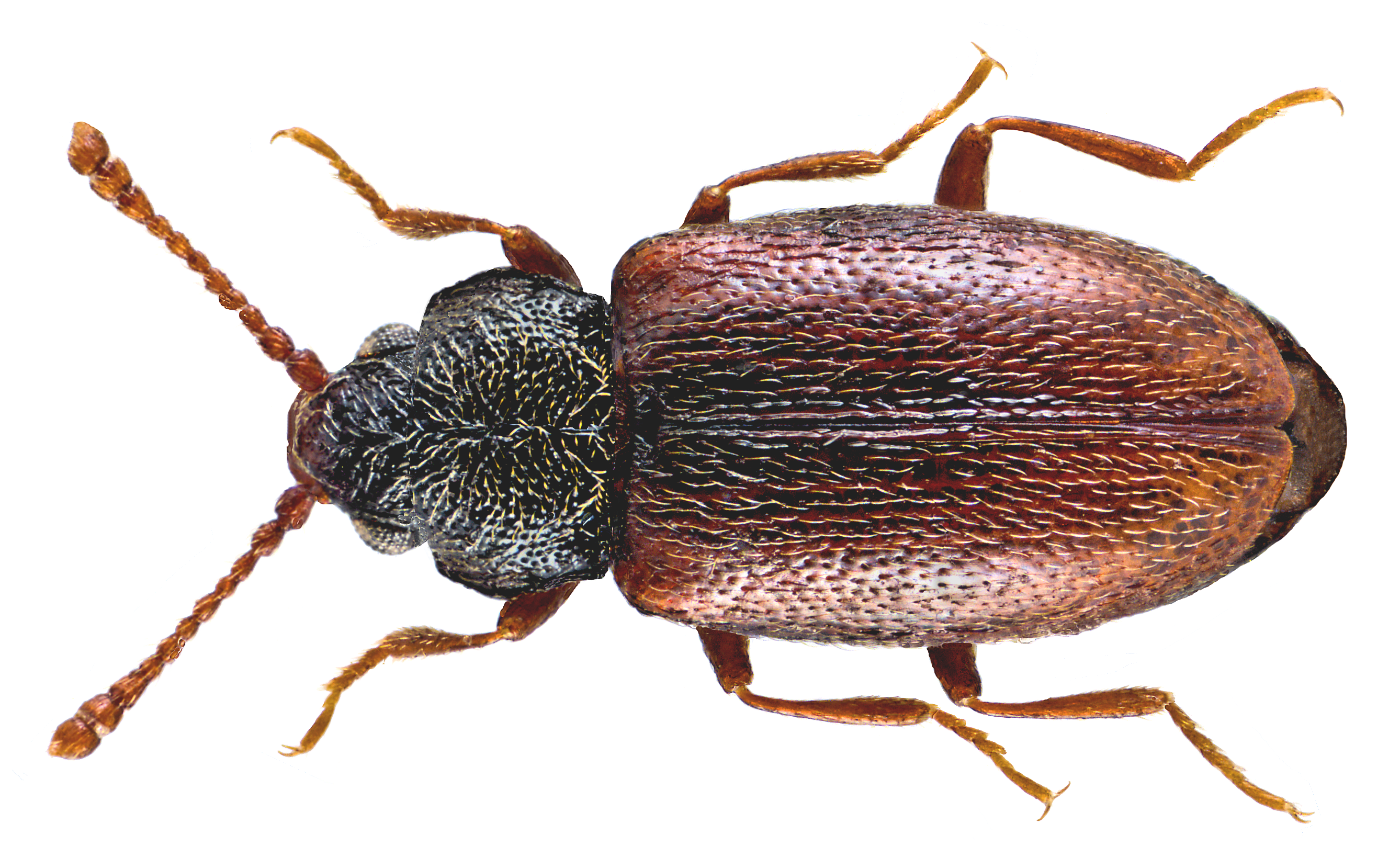
- Paramecosoma melanocephalum 2,0 mm (1,6 to 2,0 mm)

Scientific classification
- Kingdom: Animalia
- Phylum: Arthropoda
- Class: Insecta
- Order: Coleoptera
- Suborder: Polyphaga
- Infraorder: Cucujiformia
- Family: Cryptophagidae
- Genus: Paramecosoma
- Species: P. melanocephalum

Binomial name
- Paramecosoma melanocephalum ( Herbst, 1793)

= Paramecosoma melanocephalum =

Species of beetle

Paramecosoma melanocephalum is a species of silken fungus beetle native to Europe.
