= Paramecosoma =

Scientific classification
- Domain: Eukaryota
- Kingdom: Animalia
- Phylum: Arthropoda
- Class: Insecta
- Order: Coleoptera
- Suborder: Polyphaga
- Infraorder: Cucujiformia
- Family: Cryptophagidae
- Genus: Paramecosoma; Curtis, 1833

Genus of beetles

Paramecosoma is a genus of beetles belonging to the family Cryptophagidae.

Species:

- Paramecosoma melanocephalum (Herbst, 1793)
