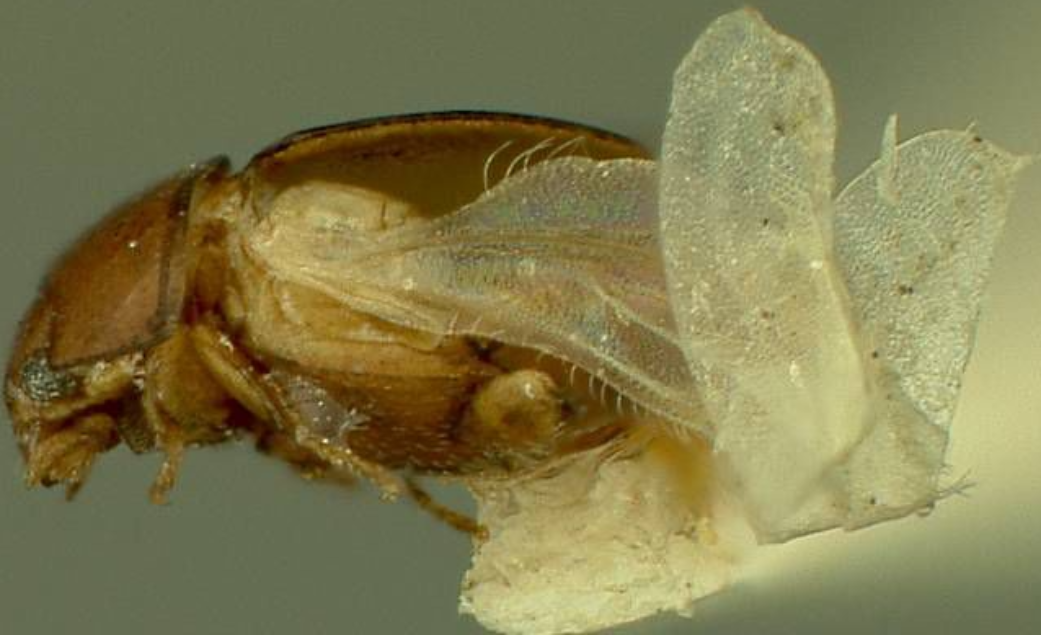
- Holotype specimen of Eidoreus politus

Scientific classification
- Kingdom: Animalia
- Phylum: Arthropoda
- Clade: Pancrustacea
- Class: Insecta
- Order: Coleoptera
- Suborder: Polyphaga
- Infraorder: Cucujiformia
- Superfamily: Coccinelloidea
- Family: Eupsilobiidae; Casey, 1895

Genera
- See text

Synonyms
- Eupsilobiinae

= Eupsilobiidae =

Family of beetles

Eupsilobiidae is a family of beetles in the superfamily Coccinelloidea, formerly included within the family Endomychidae or Erotylidae.

Most genera are restricted to the Neotropics, while the genus Eidoreus is found worldwide. They are fungivores, and have been observed living commensally in bee and ant nests.

== Genera ==
The following seven genera, altogether comprising 16 species, are currently included in Eupsilobiidae:

- Cerasommatidia Brèthes, 1925
- Chileolobius Pakaluk & Ślipiński, 1990
- Eidoreus Sharp, 1885
- Evolocera Sharp, 1902
- Ibicarella Pakaluk & Ślipiński, 1990
- Microxenus Wollaston, 1861 – South Africa
- Natalinus Tomaszewska, 2011 – South Africa
