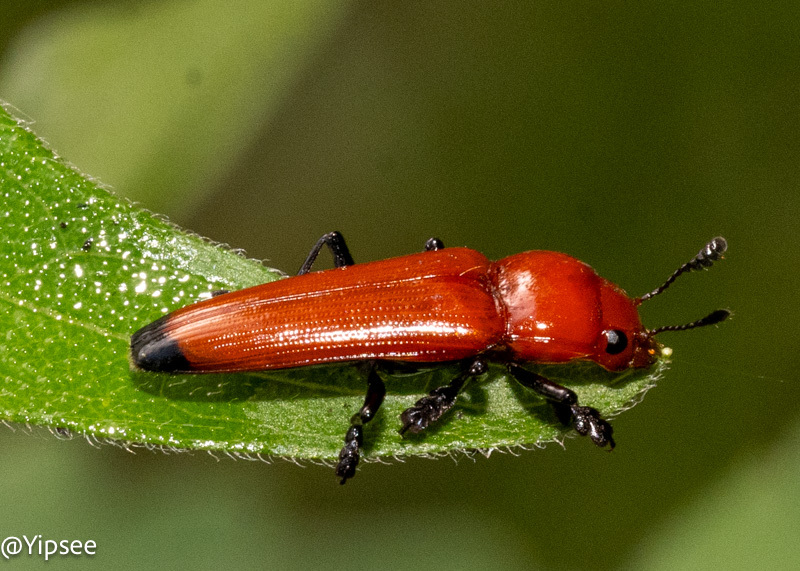
- Doubledaya ustulata in Mae On District, Thailand

Scientific classification
- Kingdom: Animalia
- Phylum: Arthropoda
- Clade: Pancrustacea
- Class: Insecta
- Order: Coleoptera
- Suborder: Polyphaga
- Infraorder: Cucujiformia
- Family: Erotylidae
- Subfamily: Languriinae
- Tribe: Languriini; Hope, 1840 ["1841"]

Synonyms
- Cladoxenini Arrow, 1925; Languriini Crotch, 1873 (lapsus)

= Languriini =

Tribe of beetles

Languriini is a tribe of pleasing fungus beetles (family Erotylidae) commonly known as the lizard beetles. They belong to subfamily Languriinae, formerly a distinct family (in which case the Languriini were up-ranked to subfamily and named Languriinae); sometimes the Languriinae are entirely merged into subfamily Erotylinae. The name Languriini was mistakenly attributed to George Robert Crotch for some time before the early 21st century.

Lizard beetles are a mostly tropical group; while they are very common in temperate North America east of the Rocky Mountains, with less than 20 species in a mere handful of genera they are not particularly diverse there. Adults are generally narrow, parallel-sided or somewhat tapering towards the elytra tips, and often metallic and/or with a red thorax. Unlike other Erotylidae, they are commonly found on leaves or flowers, and their larvae bore into plant stems instead of eating fungi like most of their relatives.

== Genera ==
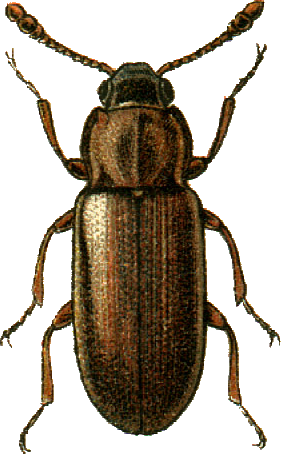
Leucohimatium langi

Languriini unite about 670 species in roughly 60 genera:

- Acropteroxys
- Amyduvea Zia, 1934
- Anadastus Gorham, 1887 (=Neolanguria, Perilanguria, Stenodastus)
- Anisoderomorpha Arrow, 1925
- Anomalolanguria Villiers, 1943
- Apterodastus Arrow, 1925
- Basulanguria Sengupta & Mukherjee, 1977
- Brasilanguria Martins & Perreira, 1965
- Caenolanguria Gorham, 1887 (=Acrolanguria, Coenolanguria (lapsus), Caenoelanguria (lapsus), Gurilana)
- Callilanguria Crotch, 1876
- Camptocarpus Gorham, 1887
- Celolanguria Arrow, 1925
- Chromauges Gorham, 1887
- Cladoxena Motschulsky, 1866
- Clerolanguria Villiers, 1943
- Compsolanguria Fowler, 1886
- Congodastus Villiers, 1961
- Crotchia Fowler, 1886 (=Croatchia (lapsus), "Cladophila" (nomen nudum), Deerratus)
- Dasydactylus
- Doubledaya White, 1850 (=Coptolanguria, Cosmolanguria, Glyphilanguria, Languriosoma)
- Ectrapezidera Fowler, 1909
- Epilanguria Fowler, 1908 (=Leptolanguria)
- Fatua Crotch, 1876 (=Macromelea)
- Ganluria Heller, 1918
- Goniolanguria Crotch, 1875 (="Goniocephala", nomen nudum)
- Idiolanguria Arrow, 1925
- Ischnolanguria Kraatz, 1900 (=Ischonolanguria (lapsus))
- Labidolanguria Fowler, 1908
- Languria (=Janessa)
- Languriomorpha (sometimes in Pachylanguria)
- Languriophasma Arrow, 1925 (= Languriiphasma (lapsus))
- Langurites
- Leucohimatium Rosenhauer, 1856 (= Leucohivatium (lapsus))
- Ligurana Chûjô, 1974
- Malleolanguria Martins & Perreira, 1965
- Megalanguria Arrow, 1925
- Meristobelus Gorham, 1887
- Microlanguria Lewis, 1884 (=Microcladoxena, Platycladoxena)
- Neanadastus Zia, 1959
- Neocladoxena Maeda, 1974
- Neoloberolus Leschen, 2003
- Nomotus Gorham, 1887
- Ortholanguria Crotch, 1875 (=Ortholanguroides)
- Oxylanguria Crotch, 1876
- Pachylanguria Crotch, 1876
- Paederolanguria Mader, 1939 (=Sinolanguria)
- Paracladoxena Fowler, 1886 (=Parachladoxena (lapsus))
- Paulianus Villiers, 1943
- Penolanguria Kolbe, 1897
- Pentelanguria Crotch, 1876 (=Pentalanguria (lapsus))
- Promecolanguria Fowler, 1885 (=Barbaropus)
- Serralanguria Huang, 2025
- Slipinskiella Leschen & Węgrzynowicz, 1998 (=Promecolanguria auct. nec Fowler, 1885: preoccupied)
- Stenolanguria Fowler, 1885
- Teretilanguria Crotch, 1875
- Tetraphala Sturm, 1843 (=Metabellus (lapsus), Metabelus, Tetralanguria, Tetralanguroides)
- Tomolanguria Huang, 2020
- Trapezidera Motschulsky, 1860
- Trapezidistes Fowler, 1887 (=Chirolanguria, Lacertobelus)
