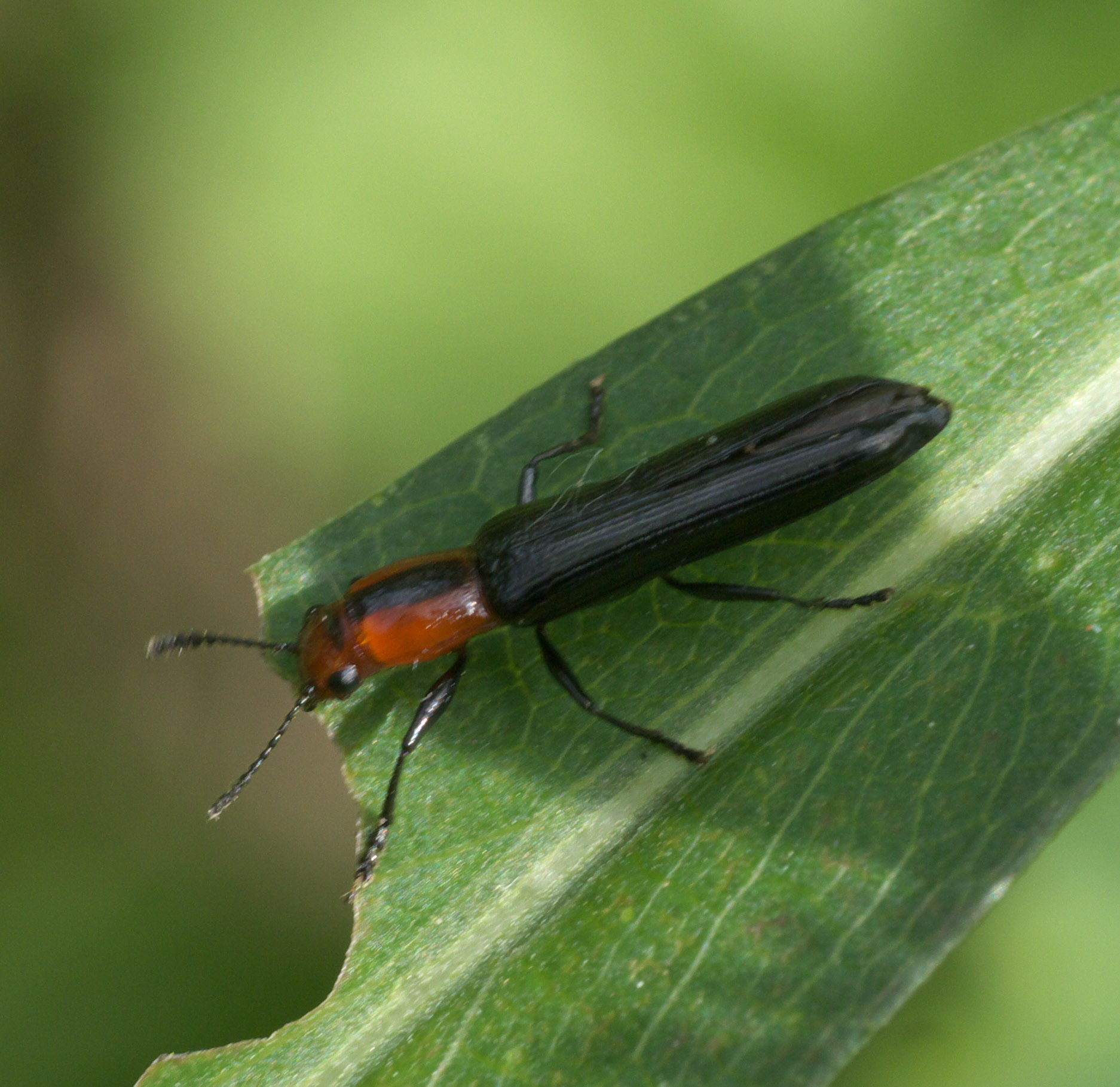
- Acropteroxys gracilis

Scientific classification
- Kingdom: Animalia
- Phylum: Arthropoda
- Clade: Pancrustacea
- Class: Insecta
- Order: Coleoptera
- Suborder: Polyphaga
- Infraorder: Cucujiformia
- Family: Erotylidae
- Subfamily: Languriinae; Hope, 1840

= Languriinae =

Subfamily of beetle

Languriinae is a subfamily of pleasing fungus beetle in the family Erotylidae.

== Taxonomy ==
There are three tribes in Languriinae:

- Hapalipini Leschen, 2003
- Languriini Hope, 1840 - lizard beetles
- Thallisellini Sen Gupta, 1968
