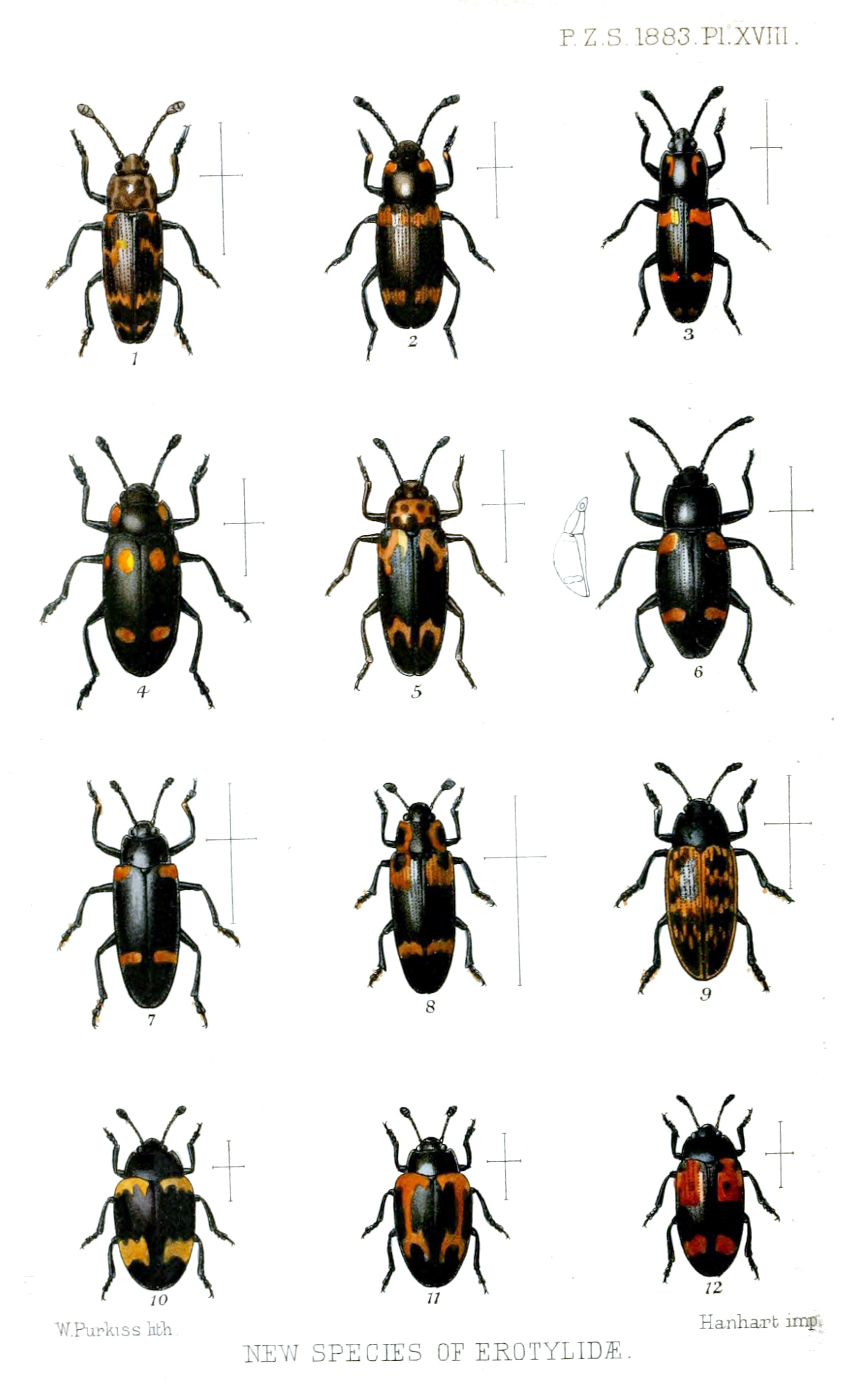
- Tropical Erotylidae described by Henry Stephen Gorham in 1888

Scientific classification
- Kingdom: Animalia
- Phylum: Arthropoda
- Clade: Pancrustacea
- Class: Insecta
- Order: Coleoptera
- Suborder: Polyphaga
- Infraorder: Cucujiformia
- Superfamily: Cucujoidea
- Family: Erotylidae; Latreille, 1802

Subfamilies
- Cryptophilinae Casey, 1900; Dacninae Gistel, 1856; Encaustinae Crotch, 1876; Erotylinae Latreille, 1802; Languriinae Hope, 1840; Loberinae Bruce, 1951; Megalodacninae Sen Gupta, 1969; Pharaxonothinae Crowson, 1952; Tritominae Curtis, 1834; Xenoscelinae Ganglbauer, 1899; (but see text)

= Erotylidae =

Pleasing fungus beetles Temporal range: Barremian–Recent

Family of beetles

Erotylidae, or the pleasing fungus beetles, is a family of small beetles. At most some 2 cm (less than 1 inch) long, some species of Erotylidae are as small as 2 mm. They belong to superfamily Cucujoidea and contain hundreds of genera, with much more than 3.000 described species, and new ones being discovered even today. The family name, like the common name referring to their often colorful, shiny and rounded "cute" appearance, means "darling" or "beloved" (from Ancient Greek ἐρωτύλος); they were historically popular with insect collectors.

In the present circumscription, the family contains up to 10 subfamilies (Cryptophilinae, Dacninae, Encaustinae, Erotylinae, Languriinae, Loberinae, Megalodacninae, Pharaxonothinae, Tritominae, and Xenoscelinae, but see below). In other words, the narrowly circumscribed Erotylidae correspond to the subfamily Erotylinae in the former definition sensu lato; other subfamilies of the old loosely-defined Erotylidae have nowadays been restored to independent family status within the Cucujoidea.

Pleasing fungus beetles are an ancient lineage, probably originating considerably more than 100 million years ago. The oldest fossil assigned to this group is an undescribed species known from Early Cretaceous (Barremian) Lebanese amber.

== Description and ecology ==
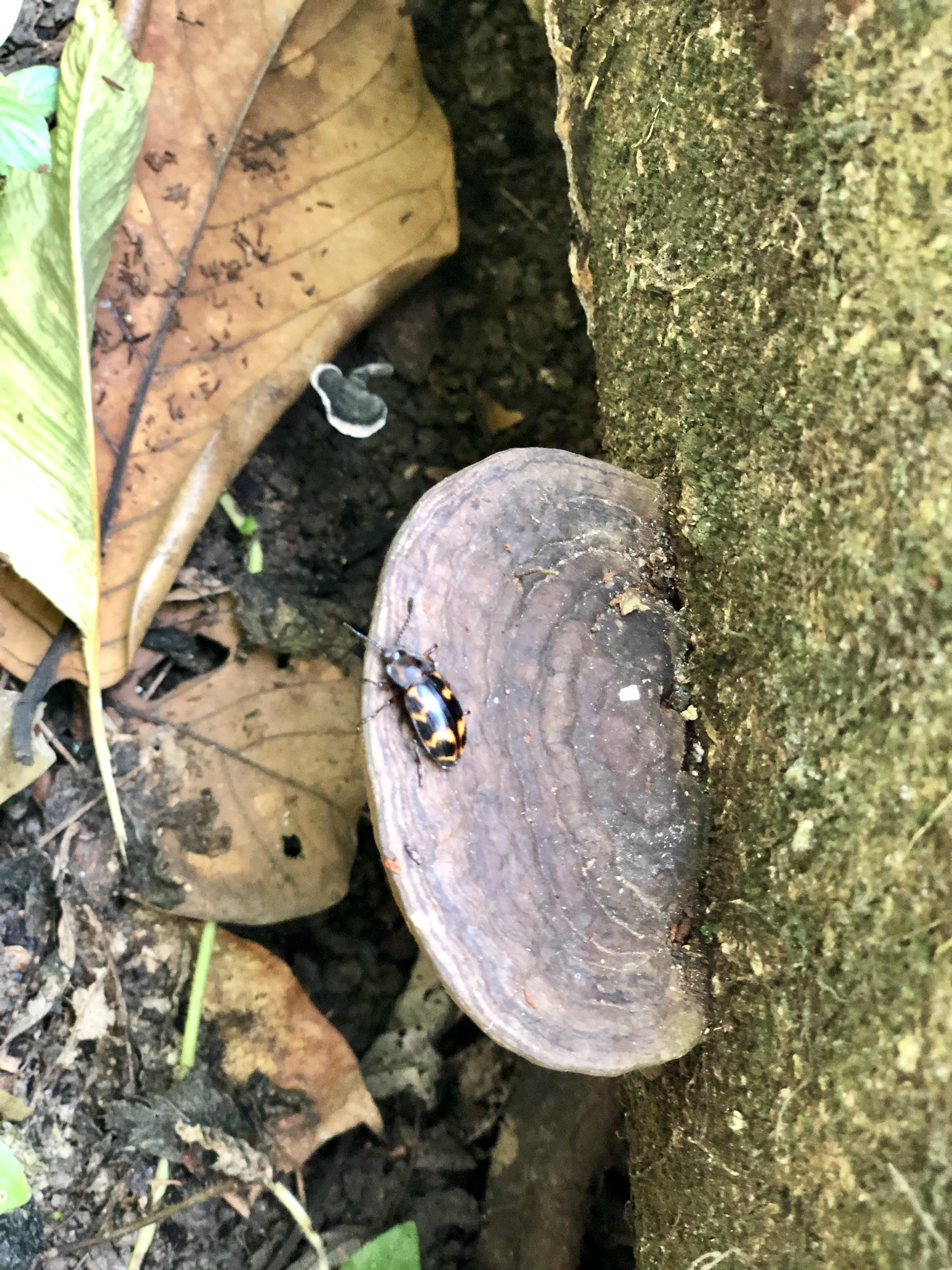
Unidentified pleasing fungus beetle on bracket fungus in Singapore

These beetles are typically smallish (less than 1 cm long) as adults, and have a more or less oval "pill-shaped" form; some genera are elongated, some are more rounded. Their antennae are rather large compared to their overall size, and usually prominently expanded at the tip. The usual coloration of pleasing fungus beetles is either black (often with a few jagged bands across or large spots on the elytra in a contrasting reddish-ochre to yellowish color), tan to chestnut brown (often with numerous small black dots on the upperside), or part black part brown without pattern. While most genera have a shiny surface, occasionally with metallic iridescence, some are hairy.

The members of this family have a characteristic combination of synapomorphies which distinguishes them from their relatives: gland ducts below and an impressed line above the compound eyes, the keel on the pronotum sides is simple, the coxal cavities of the forelegs are laterally extended, a trochantinal notch is present, the sides of the midleg cavities are closed by a forward expansion of the metasternum, and the aedeagus of the male genitalia has fairly long struts on the penis and is laterally compressed.

Erotylidae feed on plant and fungal matter; some are important pollinators (e.g. of the ancient cycads), while a few have gained notoriety as pests of some significance. Sometimes, useful and harmful species are found in one genus, e.g. Pharaxonotha. Most pleasing fungus beetles, however, are inoffensive animals of little significance to humans.

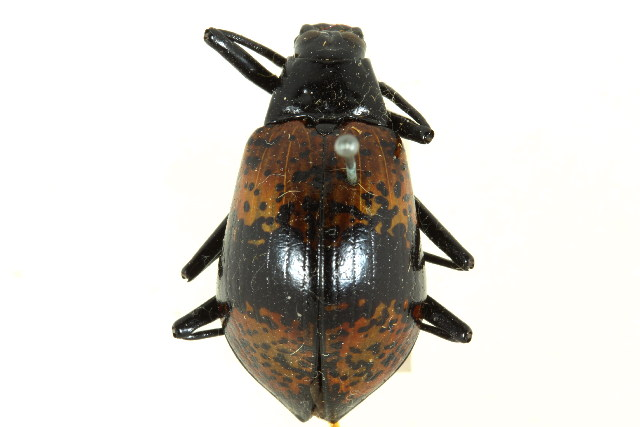
With the "feet" hidden, this Cuphotes sphacelatus darkling beetle is indistinguishable from the pleasing fungus beetle Cypherotylus duponcheli

It is sometimes asserted that the contrasting coloration of many Erotylidae signals a revolting taste or even toxicity. However, actual data are almost non-existent beyond the recognition of apparent mimicry complexes, e.g. involving Megalodacne and the sap beetles of genus Glischrochilus, Cypherotylus and the darkling beetles of genus Cuphotes, or various genera of pleasing fungus beetles and carrion beetles or handsome fungus beetles or the darkling beetles of genus Diaperis. Also, there are anecdotal observations, such as an American five-lined skink (Plestiodon fasciatus) – usually a voracious hunter of small beetles – which ignored individuals of I.quadripunctatus even when the beetles came as close as to touch the predator. But it is not clear which species mimics which, or if they are actually all repulsive to predators (making the mimicry Müllerian).

== Systematics ==
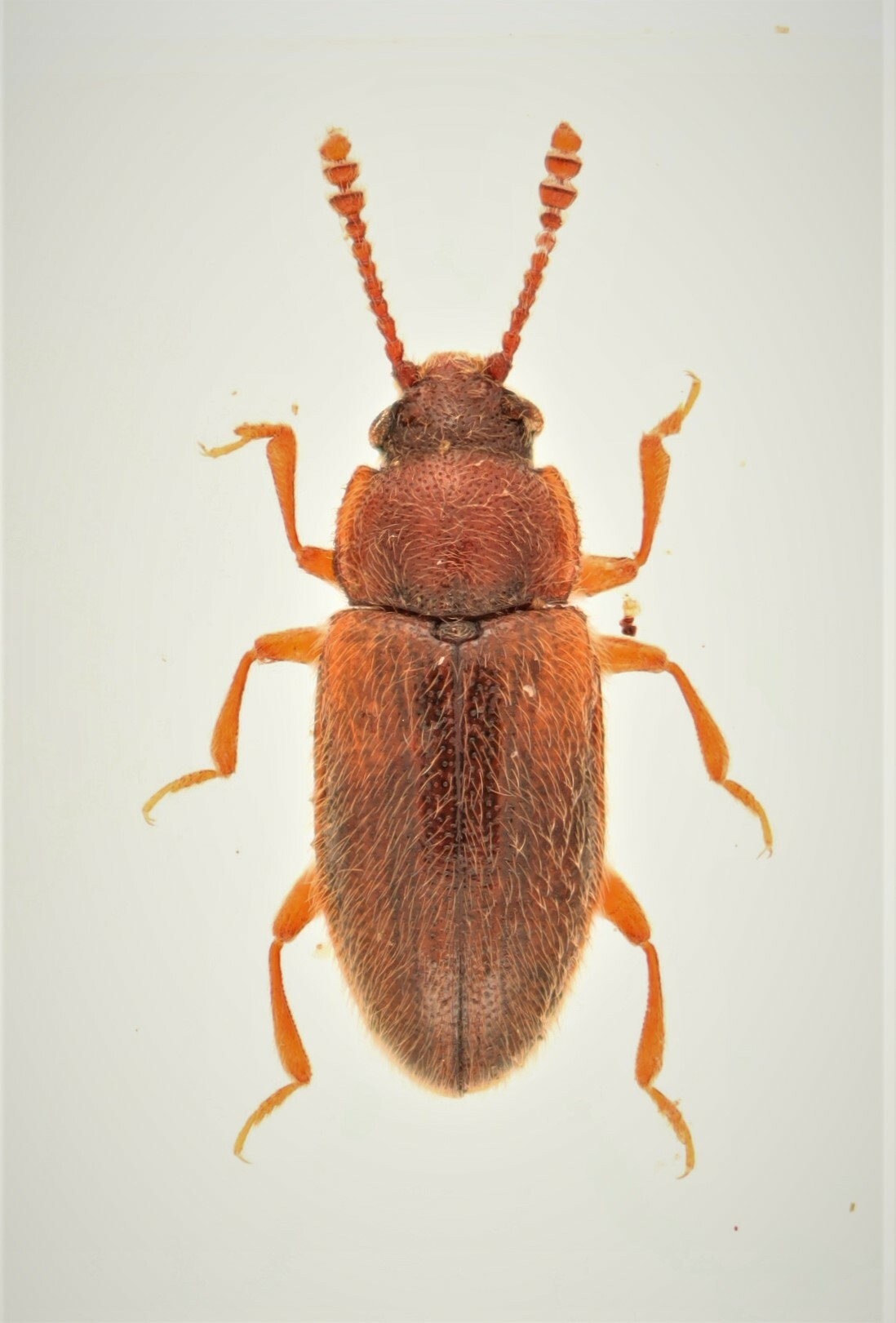
Cryptophilus obliteratus (Cryptophilinae or Xenoscelinae)

Dacne japonica (Dacninae or Erotylinae)

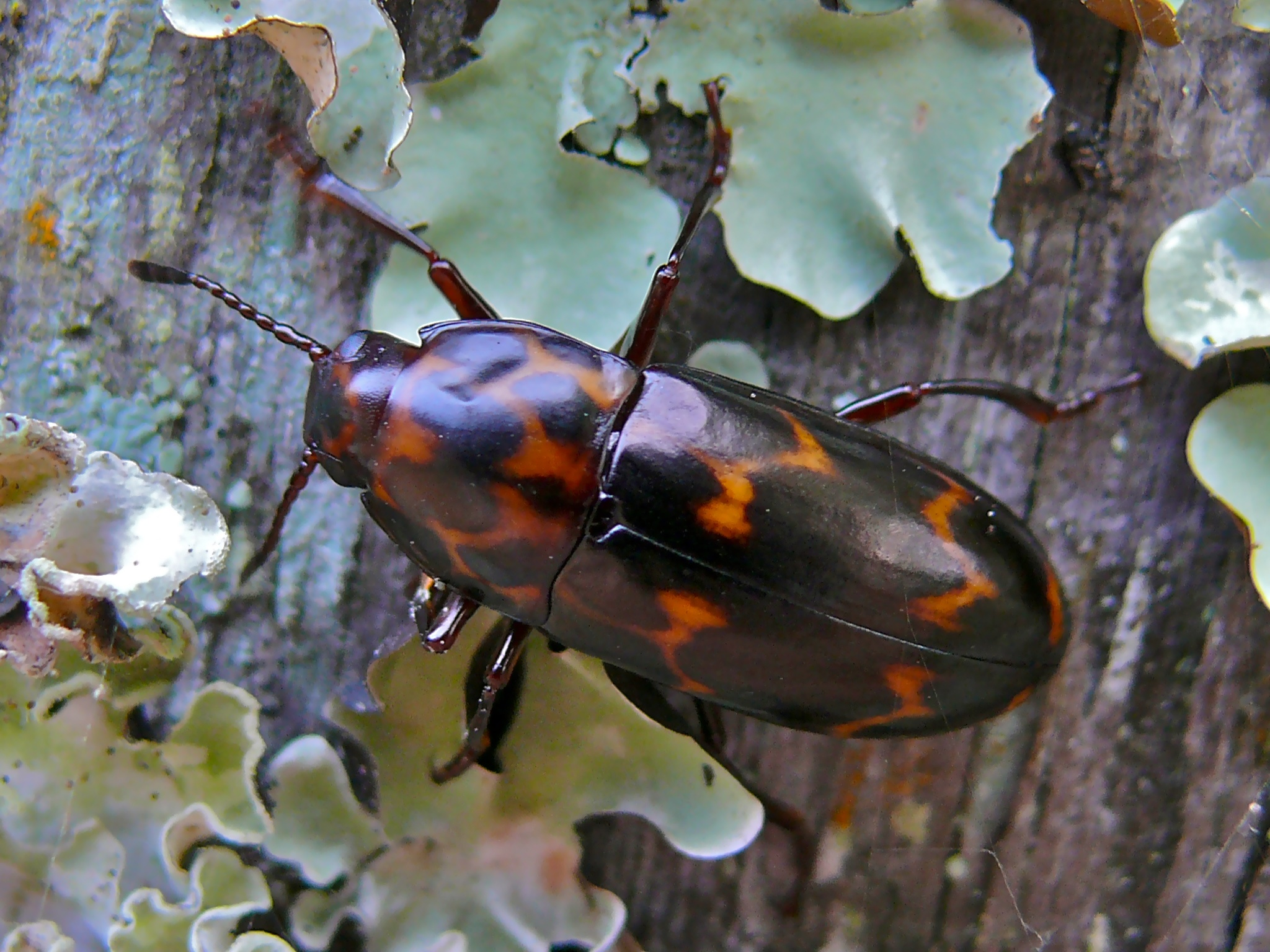
Micrencaustes lunulata (Encaustinae or Erotylinae)

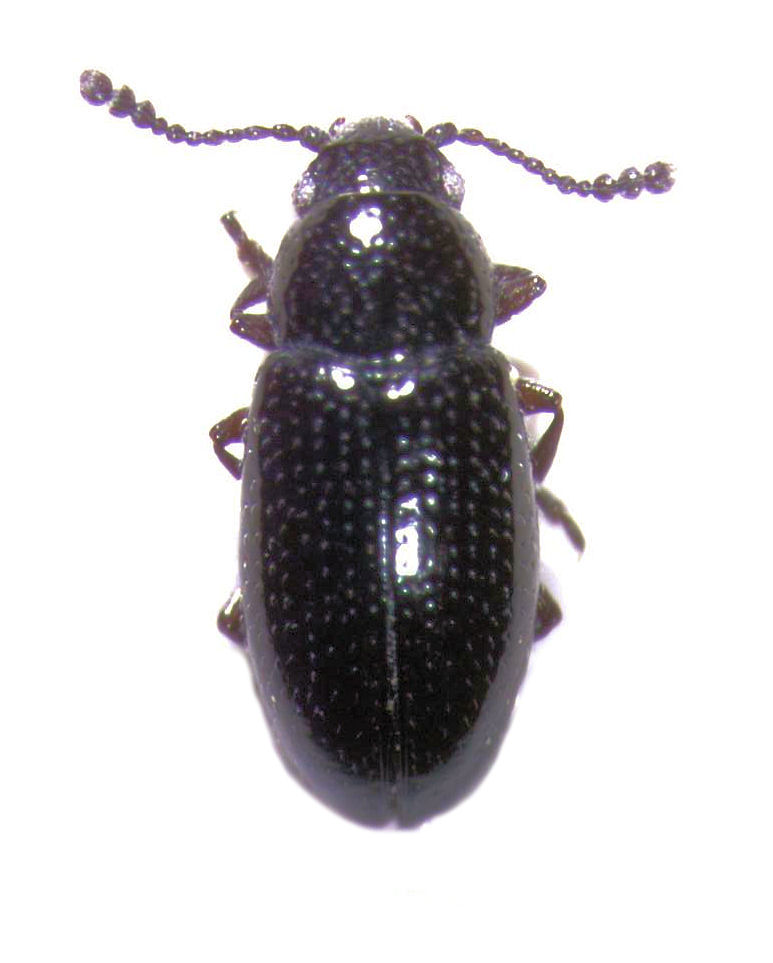
Loberus anthracinus (Loberinae)

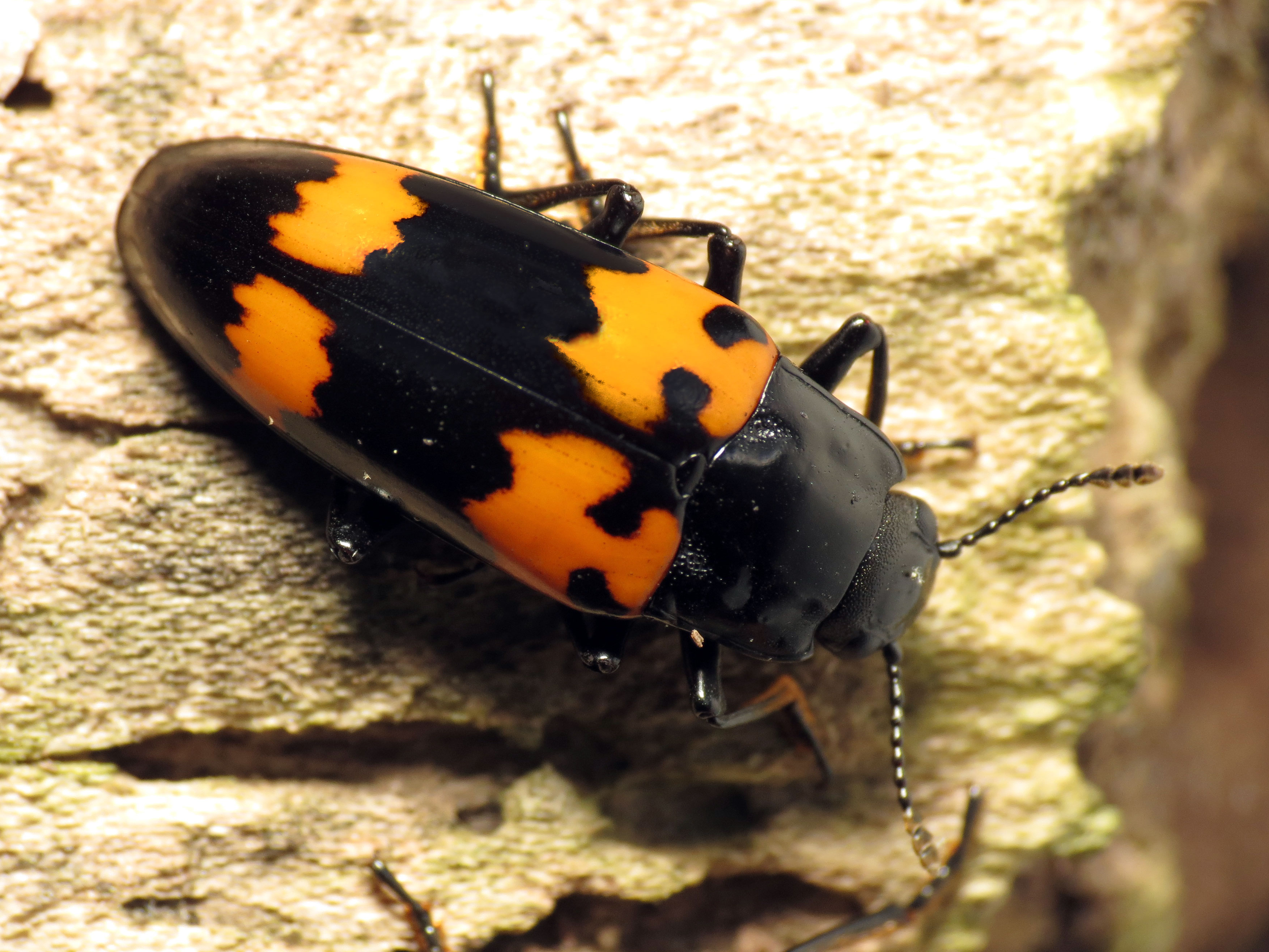
Megalodacne heros (Megalodacninae or Erotylinae)

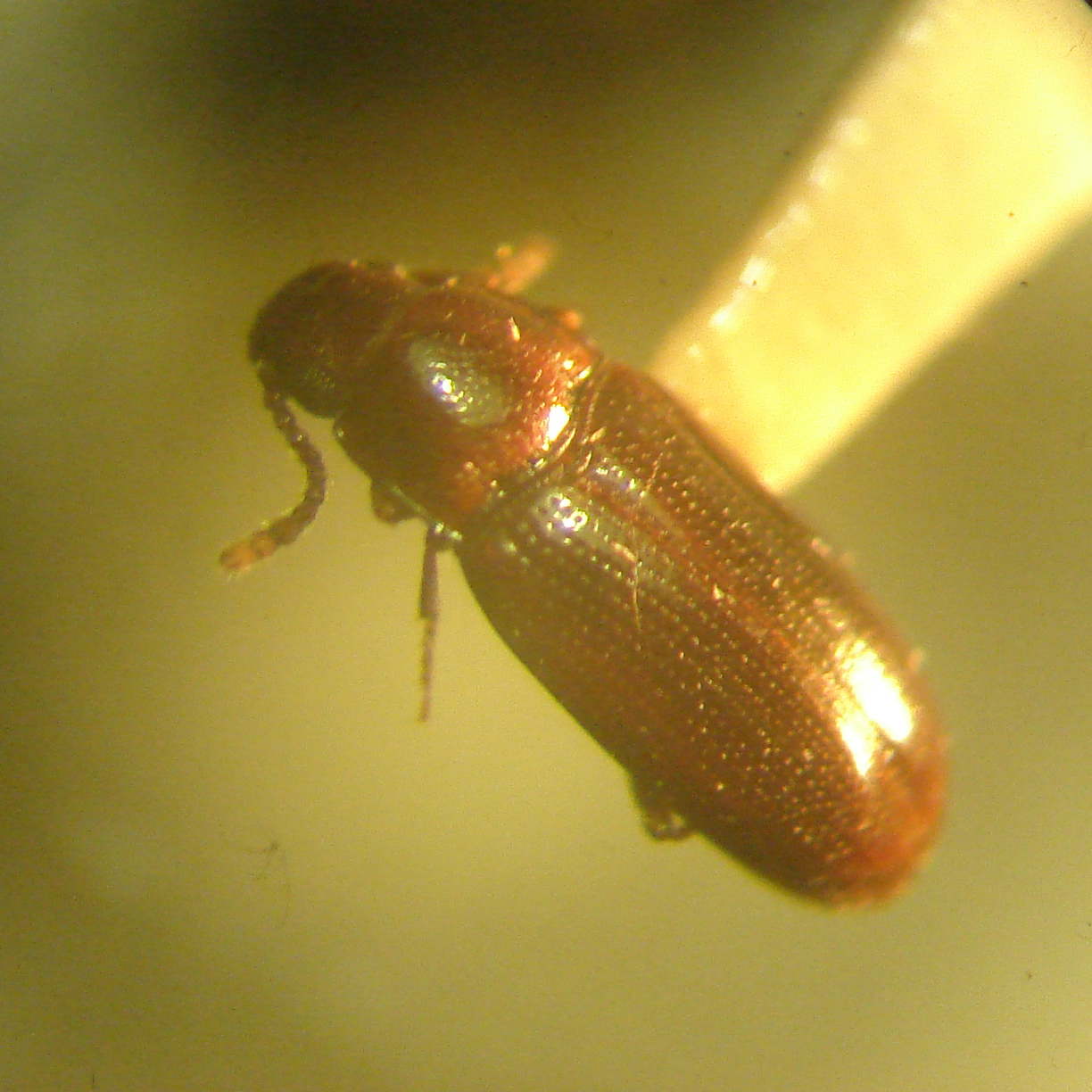
Pharaxonotha kirschii (Pharaxonothinae or Xenoscelinae)

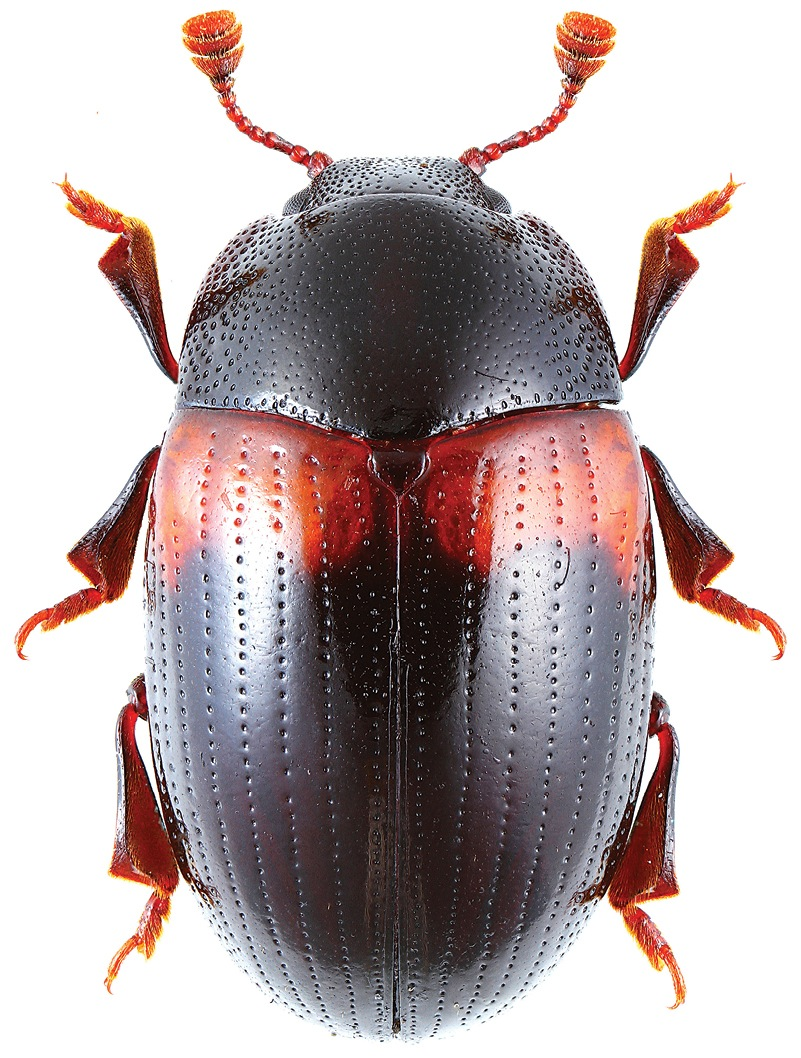
Scelidopetalon biwenxuani (Tritominae or Erotylinae)

Historically, the pleasing fungus beetles with their prominent "clubbed" antenna tips were long affiliated with the "Clavicornia". These were eventually resolved to be a polyphyletic assemblage of more-or-less-closely related Cucujiformia families and replaced by several superfamilies, with the Erotylidae assigned to the "flat-bodied" bark and fungus beetle superfamily Cucujoidea. Their closest relatives are still undetermined, but many have been proposed throughout the years: Some of these, like the Alexiidae/Cerylonidae and the handsome fungus beetles (Endomychidae), or the false skin beetles (Biphyllidae), turned out to be unrelated Cucujiformia which simply look similar (mainly in having "clavicorn" antennae). Other authors proposed the Erotylidae to be part of a clade with silken fungus beetles (Cryptophagidae) and the small cucujiform family Propalticidae, or with the Phloeostichidae (another unusual family of fungus beetles) and the singular Australian genus Lamingtonium. Molecular data tentatively support the enigmatic Propalticidae as closely related to pleasing fungus beetles, but as part of a clade containing lined and the "typical" flat bark beetles (Laemophloeidae and Cucujidae), the shining flower beetles (Phalacridae), but not the silken fungus beetles; a clade uniting the Erotylidae with Monotomidae, Helotidae, and the relict genus Ericmodes was considered about as likely however.

The division into subfamilies and tribes is not definitely established. For example, the Cryptophilinae, Loberinae and Pharaxonothinae are sometimes included as tribes in the Xenoscelinae, and similarly the Dacninae, Encaustinae, Megalodacninae and Tritominae in the Erotylinae, resulting in a 3-subfamily arrangement. The lasting doubts on the monophyly of lower ranked taxa within Erotylidae necessitate further phylogenetic studies with better sampling and studies of unexplored character sets, for example the metendosternite and penile flagellum, which are generally lacking detailed morphological studies within the Coleoptera literature.

=== Selected genera ===
The following genera are a sample of those usually retained in the reduced Erotylidae:

- Acropteroxys
- Aegithus
- Afrodacne Delkeskamp, 1954
- Ameridacne Skelley, 2009
- Antillengis Skelley, 2009
- Apetus Delkeskamp, 1935
- Apteronesitis Arrow, 1928
- Asmonax Gorham, 1892
- Atomarops Reitter, 1889
- Aulacocheilus
- Brachydacne Arrow, 1937
- Brachypterosa Zablotny & Leschen, 1996
- Cardiodacne Philipp, 1965
- Cathartocryptus (= Xenoscelinus)
- Chinophagus Ljubarsky, 1997
- Cnecosa Pascoe, 1866
- Combocerus
- Coptengis Crotch, 1876
- Crowsonguptus Leschen & Węgrzynowicz, 1998 (= Coelocryptus Sharp, 1900 nec Thomson, 1873: preoccupied)
- Cryptodacne
- Cryptophagops Grouvelle, 1919
- Cryptophilus
- Cycadophila Xu, Tang & Skelley, 2015
- Cypherotylus (= Gibbifer)
- Cyrtengis Reitter, 1900
- Cyrtomorphus
- Dacne (= Cnesophages, Engis)
- Dasydactylus
- Dromodacne Arrow, 1925
- Echinothallis Skelley, Leschen & Liu 2021
- Empocryptus Sharp, 1900 (= Pseudhenoticus)
- Encaustes Lacordaire, 1842
- Endytus Bedel, 1882
- Episcapha
- Episcaphula Crotch, 1876 (= Cadne, Cedna, Decna, Lanugodacne; sometimes in Megalodacne)
- Epytus (= Oocyanus)
- Erotylus
- Euzostria Gorham, 1888
- Fitoa Dajoz, 1973
- Haematochiton (may belong into Mycotretus)
- Hapalips
- Henoticonus Reitter, 1878
- Hirsutotriplax (= Hirsotriplax)
- Hoplepiscapha Lea, 1922
- Hornerotylus Chûjô, 1941 (formerly in Aulacocheilus)
- Hybosoma Gorham, 1883
- Idiodacne Arrow, 1925
- Iphiclus (= Brachysphoenus)
- Ischyrus Lacordaire, 1842 (= Micrischyrus)
- Kuschelengis Skelley & Leschen, 2007
- Languria (= Janessa)
- Languriomorpha
- Langurites
- Laurenticola Philipp, 1965
- Lepidotoramus
- Linodesmus Bedel, 1882
- Loberogosmus Reitter, 1876
- Loberolus Grouvelle, 1919
- Loberopsyllus Martinez & Barrera, 1966
- Loberoschema Reitter, 1896
- Loberus
- Lobosternum
- Macrodacne Heller, 1918 (1920) (sometimes in Megalodacne)
- Madadacne Philipp, 1965
- Masahiria Wegrzynowicz, 2005
- Megalodacne (= Psephodacne, Romodacne)
- Megischyrus (= Ischyrus Dejean, 1836 ("1837"; unavailable))
- Metallencaustes Heller, 1918 (1920)
- Micrencaustes Crotch, 1875 (= Mimencaustes)
- Microdacne Skelley, Leschen & Liu 2021
- Microsternus
- Mimodacne (sometimes in Megalodacne)
- Mycolybas
- Mycomystes
- Mycotretus
- Neoblytus Bedel, 1882
- Neocoptengis Heller, 1900
- Neodacne Chûjô, 1976 (sometimes in Megalodacne)
- Neopriotelus
- Neosternus Dai & Zhao, 2013 (formerly in Microsternus)
- Neothallis Fauvel, 1891 (= Monothallis)
- Nesitis Bedel, 1882
- Oretylus Heller, 1920 (sometimes in Megalodacne)
- Paphezia Zablotny & Leschen, 1996
- Paracoptengis Heller, 1918 (1920)
- Pharaxonotha
- Phonodacne Arrow, 1925
- Plagiopisthen Thomson, 1856
- Pseudischyrus (may belong into Tritoma)
- Satelia Lewis, 1887
- Scaphidomorphus
- Scaphodacne Heller, 1918 (formerly in Megalodacne)
- Setariola Jakobson, 1915
- Simocoptengis Heller, 1918 (1920)
- Stengita Reitter, 1875
- Stenodina Fairmaire, 1898
- Subana Heller, 1918 (1920)
- Tamboria Heller, 1918 (1920)
- Telmatoscius Sharp, 1900
- Tetrathallis Crotch, 1876
- Thallis Erichson, 1842
- Thaumastodacne Deelder, 1942
- Tomarops Grouvelle, 1903
- Toramus (= Itomarus)
- Trichulus Bedel, 1882
- Triplatoma Westwood, 1832 (= Pantheropterus)
- Triplax (= Paratritoma, Tritomapara)
- Tritoma (= Cyrtotriplax)
- Xenodacne Boyle, 1956
- Zavaljus

Earlier authors did not include the lizard beetles and relatives in the Erotylidae; instead, genera such as Pseudodacne (and sometimes its entire family Euxestidae) or Eidoreus (today family Eupsilobiidae) were assigned to the pleasing fungus beetle family.
