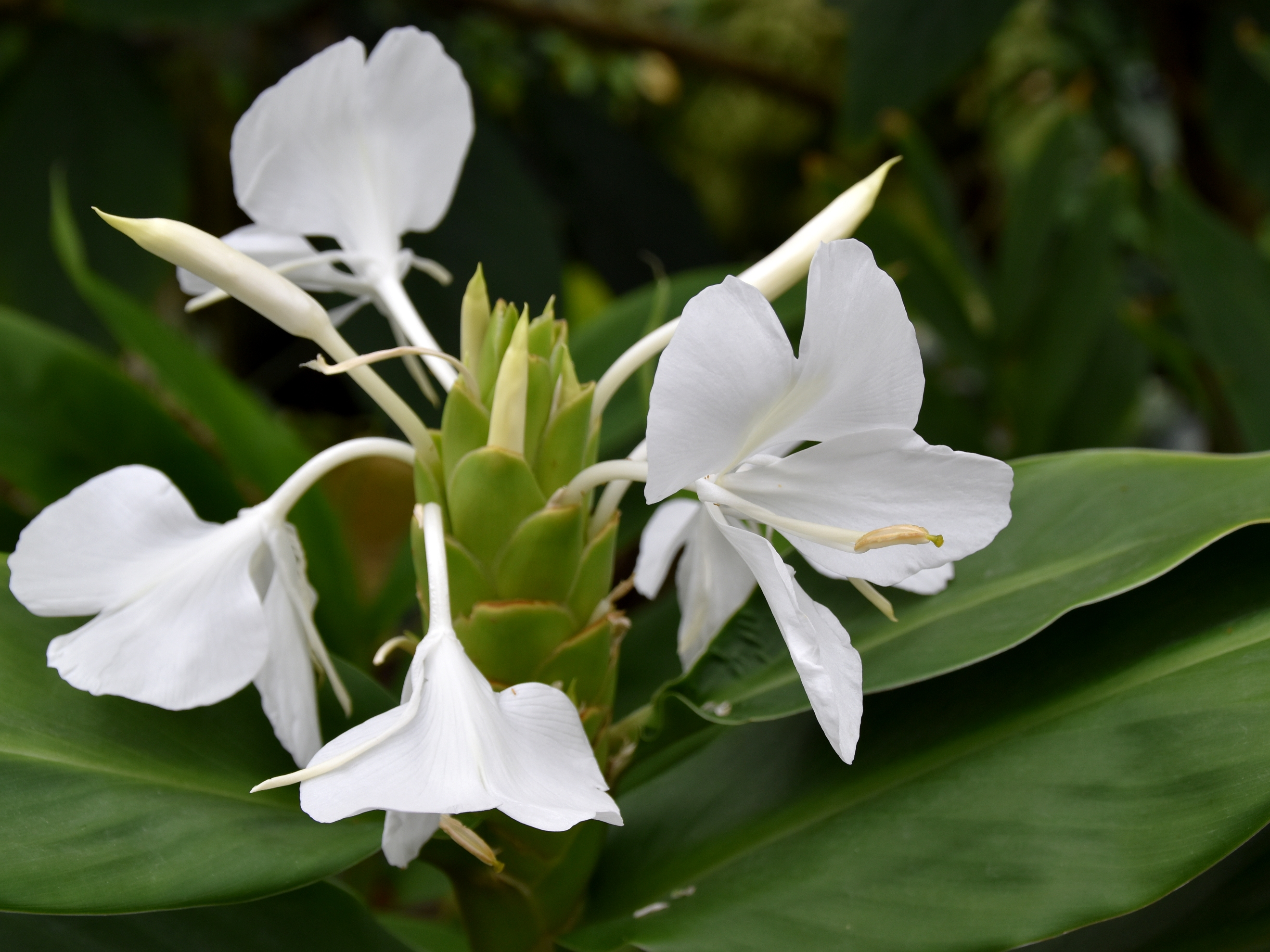

Conservation status
- Data Deficient (IUCN 3.1)

Scientific classification
- Kingdom: Plantae
- Clade: Tracheophytes
- Clade: Angiosperms
- Clade: Monocots
- Clade: Commelinids
- Order: Zingiberales
- Family: Zingiberaceae
- Genus: Hedychium
- Species: H. coronarium

Binomial name
- Hedychium coronarium J.Koenig

Synonyms
- Kaempferia hedychium Lam.; Hedychium spicatum G.Lodd.; Hedychium maximum Roscoe; Hedychium lingulatum Hassk.; Hedychium chrysoleucum Hook.; Hedychium gandasulium Buch.-Ham. ex Wall.; Hedychium prophetae Buch.-Ham. ex Wall.; Hedychium sulphureum Wall.; Hedychium coronarium var. maximum (Roscoe) Eichler; Gandasulium coronarium (J.Koenig) Kuntze; Gandasulium lingulatum (Hassk.) Kuntze; Hedychium coronarium var. chrysoleucum (Hook.) Baker; Amomum filiforme W.Hunter; Hedychium flavescens var. chrysoleucum (Hook.) C.E.C.Fisch.

= Hedychium coronarium =

Species of flowering plant

Hedychium coronarium, the white garland-lily or white ginger lily, is a perennial flowering plant in the ginger family, Zingiberaceae. It is native to the forest understorey of Asia.

Other common names include butterfly lily, Khumpui, fragrant garland flower, Indian garland flower, white butterfly ginger lily, and white ginger.

== Description ==
It is an upright perennial which may reach 1–3 m (3.3–9.8 ft) in height. It has long pointed leaves, with heavily scented white flowers with yellow bases. In its native environment flowering occurs between August and December.

== Distribution and habitat ==
It is native to the Eastern Himalayas of India (Sikkim and Tripura), Bangladesh, Nepal and Bhutan, through northernmost Myanmar and Thailand, southern China (Yunnan, Sichuan, Hunan, Guangxi and Guangdong) to Taiwan in the East.

It is typically found growing in forests.

== As an invasive species ==
Beyond its native range, H. coronarium may be invasive in shallow water systems, along streams and in waterlogged areas. Once established, it is difficult to control due to vegetative reproduction through the underground spread of rhizomes. It was introduced in Brazil in the era of slavery, said to have been brought to the country by African slaves who used its leaves as mattresses, and is now considered naturalised in the states of Rio de Janeiro (where it is classed as invasive), Bahia and Espírito Santo. This species was first introduced as an ornamental to Hawaii around 1888 by Chinese immigrants, and is now considered a serious invader in mesic to wet areas of Maui and Hawaii island. Additionally, it is invasive in South Africa, where it is a declared weed, and propagation of plant material is considered prohibited. It is also invasive in New Caledonia.

== Cultivation ==
It is cultivated in warm temperate and subtropical regions of the world as an ornamental. In China it is cultivated for use in medicine and production of aromatic oil, due to the strong characteristic fragrance of the flowers, said to be reminiscent of jasmine.

In the UK, it has received the Royal Horticultural Society's Award of Garden Merit.

=== Hardiness ===
It is evergreen in warmer climates, but deciduous in mild winter temperate regions of North America and Europe. In the UK it is rated by the Royal Horticultural Society as hardy down to −5 °C (23 °F) in mild or coastal areas (H3).

=== India ===
It is also grown in state Tripura, the Northeastern region of India and is known as Khumpui. Hedychium coronarium is regarded sacred and is mentioned in folk tales of the Tripuri people.

=== Cuba ===
Hedychium coronarium is the national flower of Cuba, where it is known as mariposa (literally "butterfly") due to its shape. Women used to adorn themselves with these fragrant flowers in Spanish colonial times; because of the intricate structure of the inflorescence, women hid and carried secret messages important to the independence cause under it. The plant has become naturalized in the cool rainy mountains in Sierra del Rosario, Pinar del Rio Province in the west, the Escambray Mountains in the center of the island, and in the Sierra Maestra in the very east of it.

== Uses ==
The flower buds and young flowers are edible. The rhizomes of the plant are used to derive essential oils due to their monoterpenoids and sesquiterpenoids compounds.

== Gallery ==
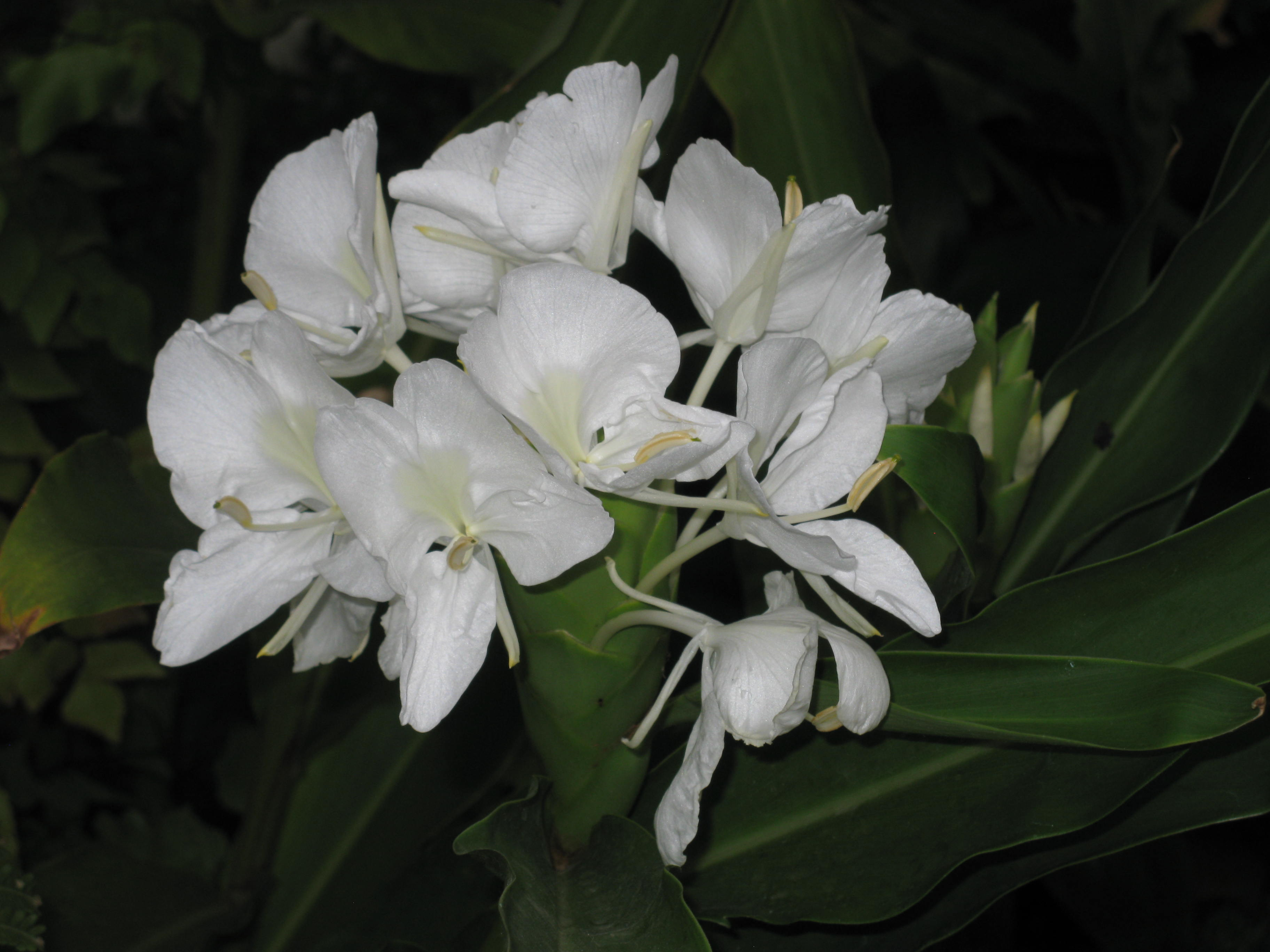

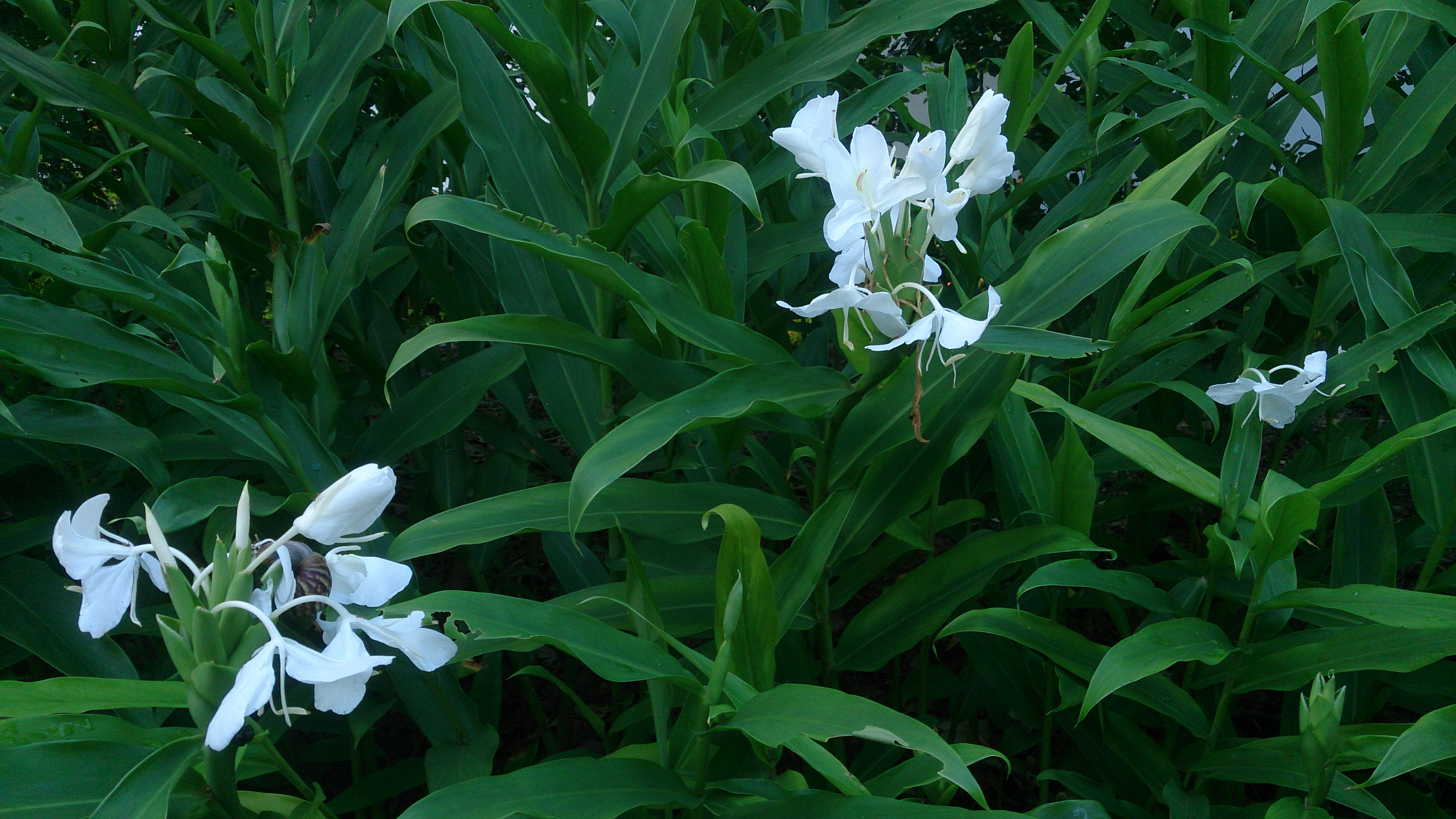

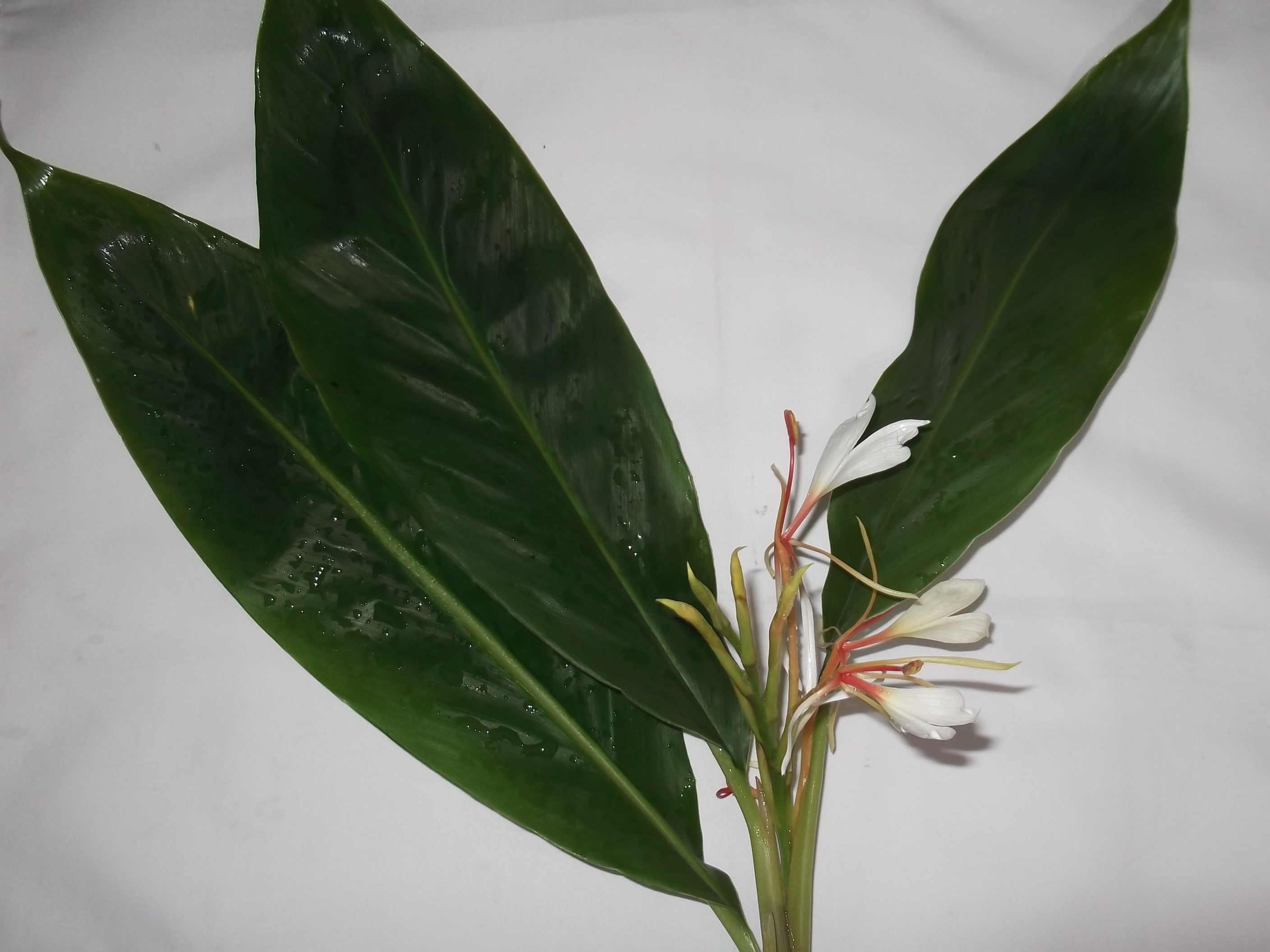

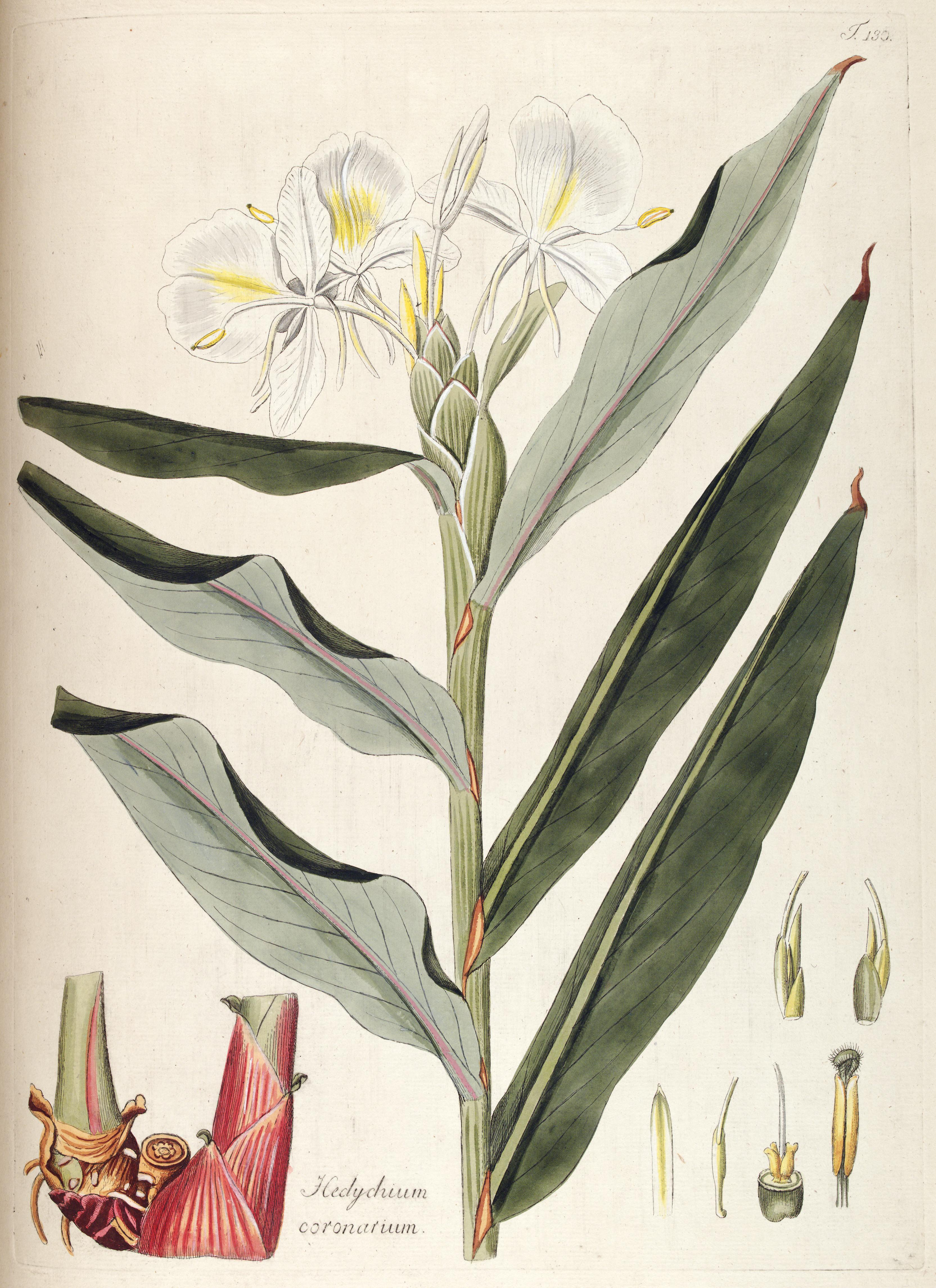
Botanical illustration (Curtis)

== See also ==
- Domesticated plants and animals of Austronesia
