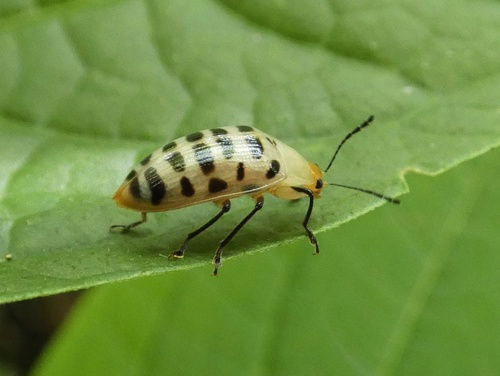
- The only Central American species, N. apiatus

Scientific classification
- Kingdom: Animalia
- Phylum: Arthropoda
- Clade: Pancrustacea
- Class: Insecta
- Order: Coleoptera
- Suborder: Polyphaga
- Infraorder: Cucujiformia
- Family: Erotylidae
- Genus: Neopriotelus; Alvarenga, 1965

Type species
- Erotylus octomaculatus Olivier, 1792

Synonyms
- Priotelus Hope, 1841 (non G.R.Gray, 1840: preoccupied)

= Neopriotelus =

Genus of beetle

Neopriotelus is a genus of Erotylidae, the pleasing fungus beetle family. Long known under the erroneous name Priotelus, these beetles belong to subfamily Erotylinae. Neopriotelus beetles are sizeable by the standards of their family, and often brightly colored in pale yellowish hues with bold black patterns.

They are a Neotropical genus, with one species (N.apiatus) occurring from southern Mexico through Central America to northern Colombia. Most, however, are found in and around the Amazon Basin, and the genus is especially diverse in the foothills of northern South America, from the Guiana Shield to the Andes foothills of Bolivia and northern Peru.

== Taxonomy ==
This genus includes the beetles traditionally known in entomology as Priotelus, established in a 1841 issue of Frederick William Hope's Coleopterists Manual. However, in 1840, the ornithologist George Robert Gray had used the same name for the Caribbean trogons, because their commonly accepted name Temnurus, proposed by William Swainson in 1837, had turned out to have already been given to the ratchet-tailed treepie by René Lesson in 1830.

Since the Caribbean trogons were often included with their mainland relatives in genus Trogon throughout most of the 19th and 20th century, the ornithological name fell into disuse, while in entomology the technically illegitimate junior homonym of the beetles remained in use unchallenged. This was rectified by Moacyr Alvarenga in 1965 by establishing Neopriotelus and subsuming the former "Priotelus" beetles into it. As the Caribbean trogons are now considered to be the basal living branch of the typical trogons, the genus name Priotelus became widely used again in the 21st century. The ratchet-tailed treepie, whose distinctness and need for a genus name caused all this confusion, is also maintained in its monotypic genus Temnurus today, distinct from the black magpies in Platysmurus.

=== Species ===
Neopriotelus contains the following species:

- Neopriotelus apiatus (Chevrolat, 1835)
- Neopriotelus bimaculatus (Mader, 1942)
- Neopriotelus calceatus (Lacordaire, 1842)
- Neopriotelus debilis (Crotch, 1876)
- Neopriotelus dejeani (Lacordaire, 1842)
- Neopriotelus detrahens (Crotch, 1876)
- Neopriotelus difficilis (Crotch, 1876)
- Neopriotelus elegans (Mader, 1942)
- Neopriotelus equestris (Lacordaire, 1842)
- Neopriotelus femoralis (Kirsch, 1865)
- Neopriotelus habrodactyloides (Crotch, 1876)
- Neopriotelus horioni (Delkeskamp, 1957)
- Neopriotelus ignobilis (Kirsch, 1865)
- Neopriotelus irroratus (Lacordaire, 1842)
- Neopriotelus limbatus (Crotch, 1876)
- Neopriotelus lineatulus (Crotch, 1876)
- Neopriotelus lividus (Lacordaire, 1842)
- Neopriotelus macasensis (Crotch, 1876)
- Neopriotelus minor (Crotch, 1876)
- Neopriotelus nitidior (Crotch, 1876)
- Neopriotelus obsoletus (Crotch, 1876)
- Neopriotelus octomaculatus (Olivier, 1792)
- Neopriotelus orphanus (Crotch, 1876)
- Neopriotelus ovatus (Crotch, 1876)
- Neopriotelus peruvianus (Mader, 1942)
- Neopriotelus quadrimaculatus (Guérin, 1956)
- Neopriotelus rugithorax (Crotch, 1876)
- Neopriotelus sexmaculatus (Crotch, 1876)
- Neopriotelus spinolae (Guérin-Méneville, 1844)
- Neopriotelus stellio (Erichson, 1847)
- Neopriotelus tigrinipennis (Lacordaire, 1842)
- Neopriotelus transversofasciatus (Crotch, 1876)
- Neopriotelus tricolor (Fabricius, 1801) (= N.jucundus)
- Neopriotelus truncatus (Lacordaire, 1842)
- Neopriotelus zebra (Kuhnt, 1910)
