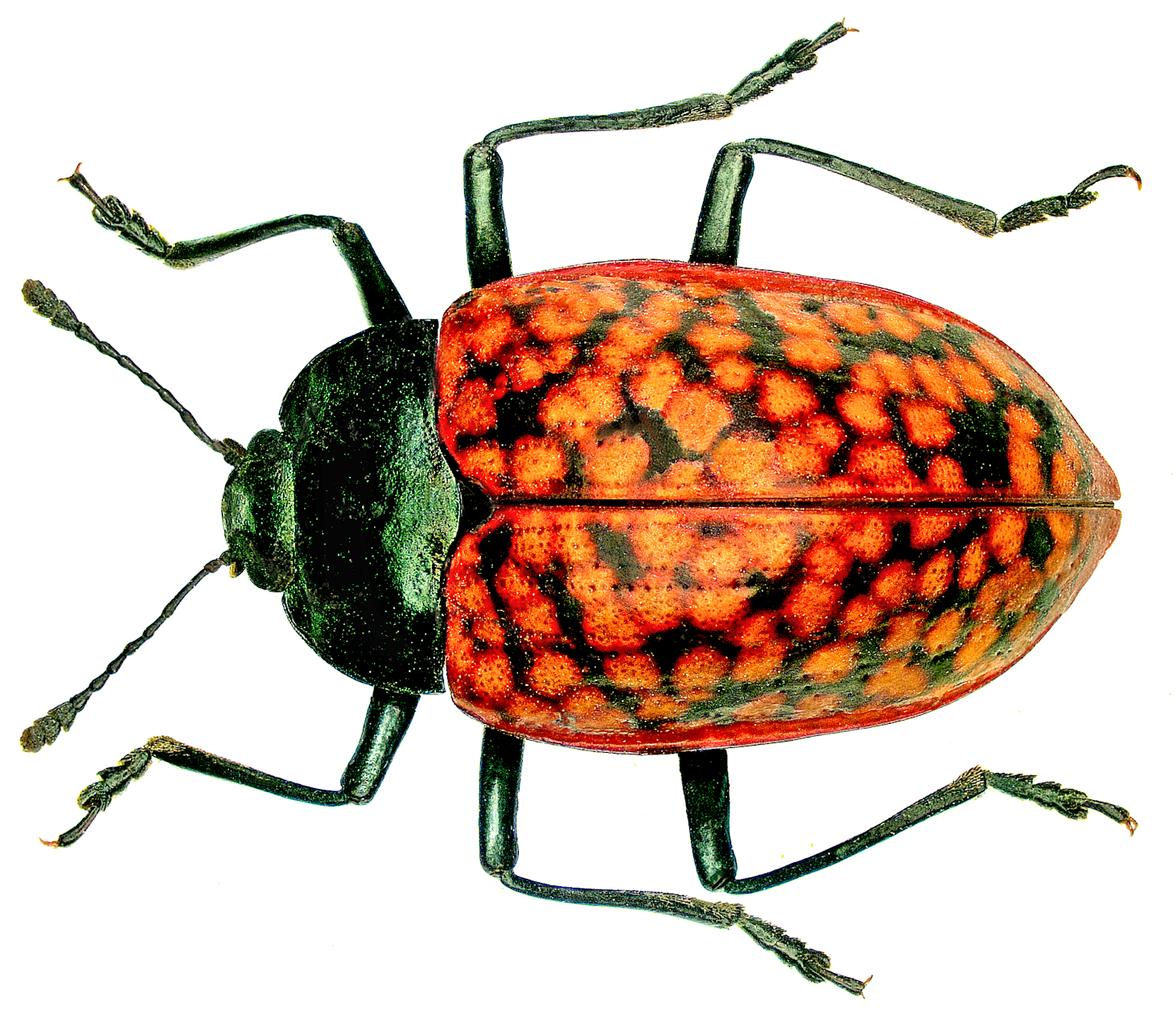
- Adult Erotylina leoparda from Manu National Park, Peru

Scientific classification
- Kingdom: Animalia
- Phylum: Arthropoda
- Clade: Pancrustacea
- Class: Insecta
- Order: Coleoptera
- Suborder: Polyphaga
- Infraorder: Cucujiformia
- Family: Erotylidae
- Subfamily: Erotylinae; Latreille, 1802

= Erotylinae =

Subfamily of beetles

Erotylinae is a subfamily of pleasing fungus beetles (family Erotylidae). It contains a lot of large (by their family's standards) and prominently-colored species.

Formerly, the name "Erotylinae" was applied to the entire present-day pleasing fungus beetle family; "Erotylidae" was at that time circumscribed more loosely and contained several lineages which are nowadays considered independent families again. Some recent authors include the subfamilies Dacninae, Encaustinae, Megalodacninae and Tritominae in the Erotylinae as tribes Dacnini, Encaustini, Megalodacnini and Tritomini; in this case the tribe Erotylini is approximately equivalent to the subfamily Erotylinae as circumscribed here.

== Selected genera ==
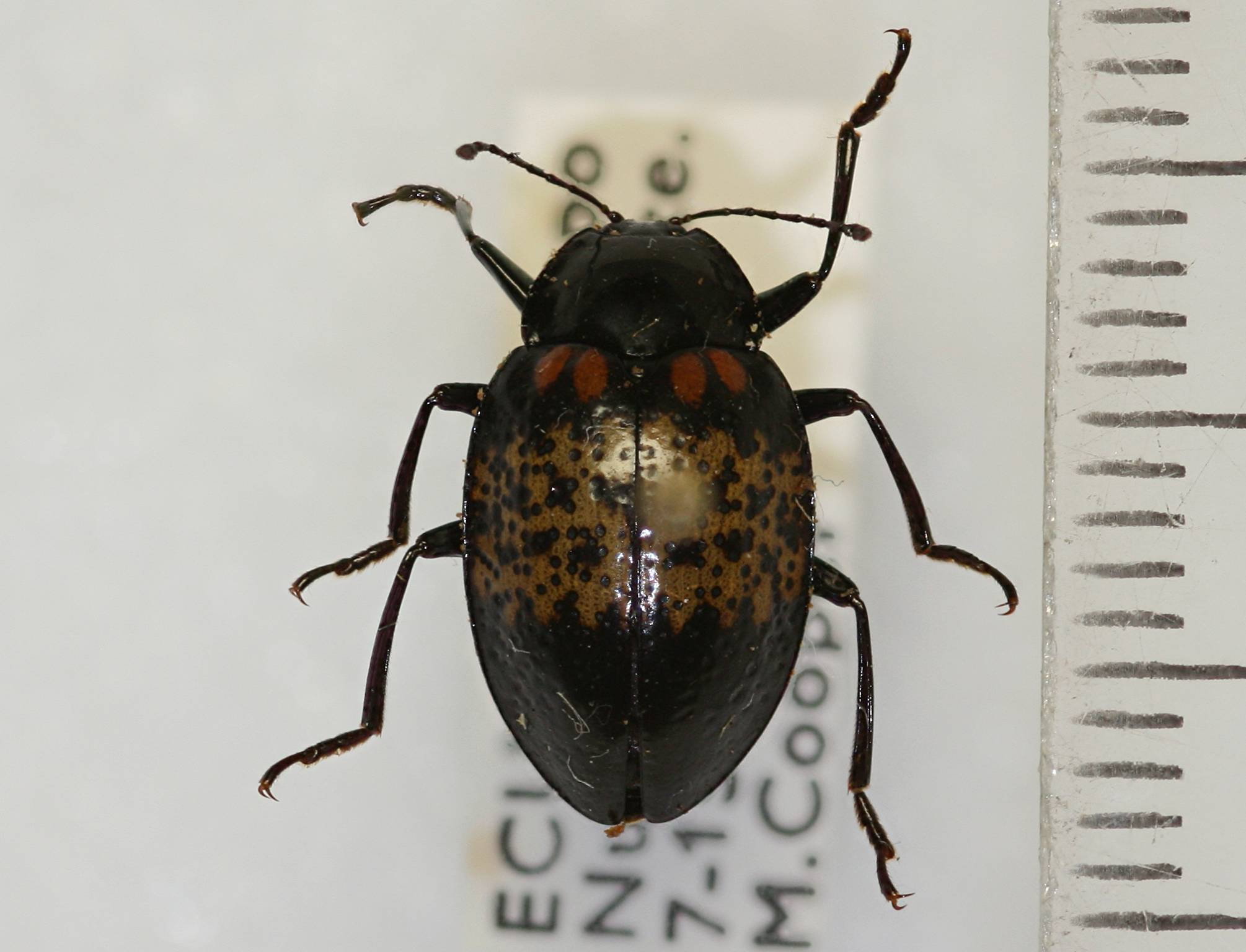
Prepopharus notatus specimen from Nueva Rocafuerte, Ecuador

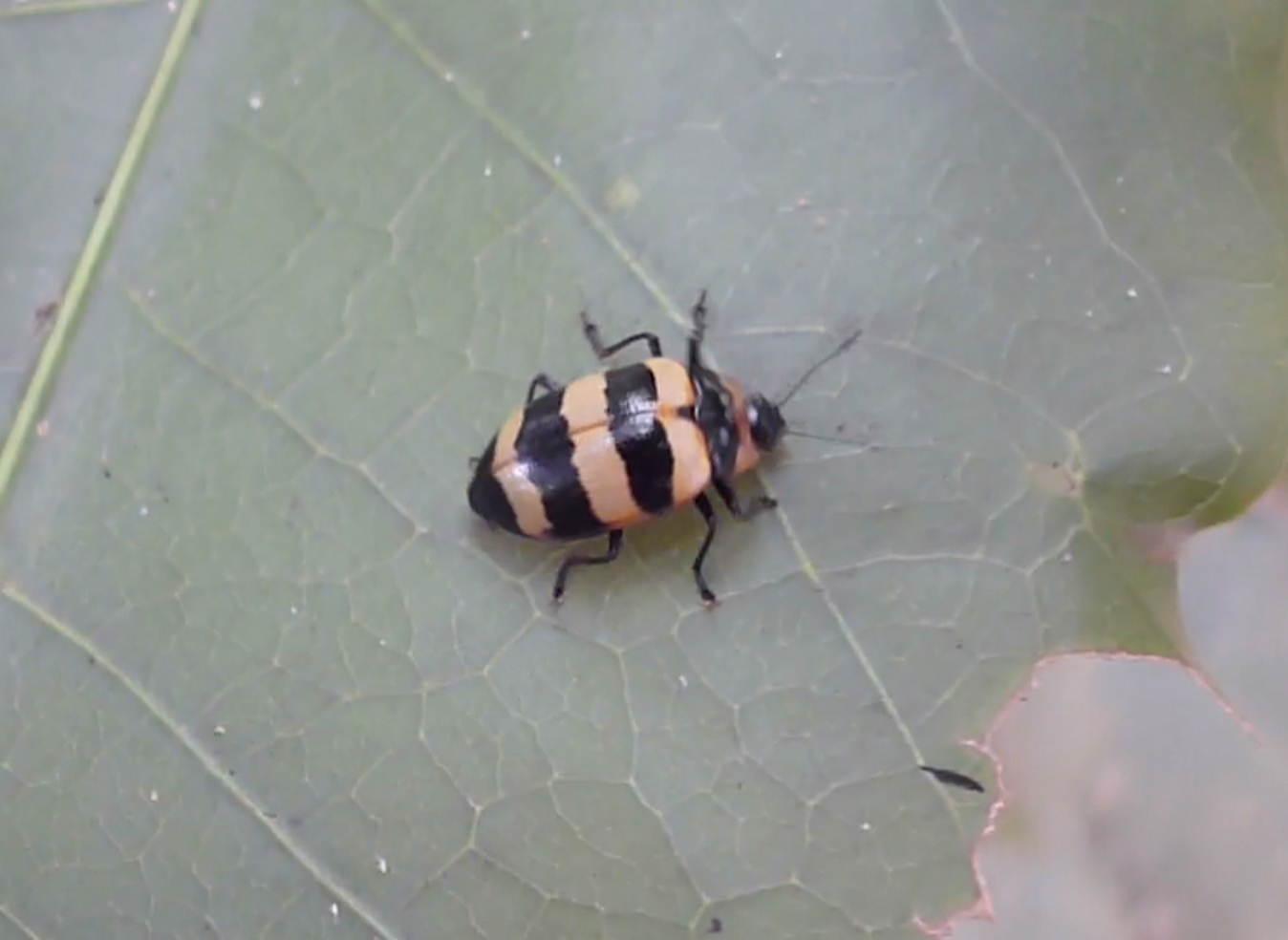
Zonarius zebra in Valencia, Venezuela

- Aegithus
- Bacis Dejean, 1837
- Barytopus Chevrolat, 1836 (= Micrerotylus)
- Brachylon Gorham, 1898
- Cyclomorphus Hope, 1841
- Cypherotylus (= Gibbifer)
- Cytorea Laporte, 1840 (= Typocephalus)
- Dichomorpha Kuhnt, 1909
- Ellipticus Chevrolat, 1836 (= Calenus, Gemellarotelus, Glabratotelus, Homeotelus, Homoeotelus, lnflatotelus, Omoiotelus)
- Erotylina Curran, 1944
- Erotylus
- Euphanistes Lacordaire, 1842
- Eurycardius Lacordaire, 1842
- Iphiclus (= Brachysphoenus)
- Kakoia Alvarenga, 1971
- Neopriotelus (= Priotelus Hope, 1841 nec G.R.Gray, 1840: preoccupied)
- Perithonius Crotch, 1876
- Phricobacis Crotch, 1876
- Plastococcus Gorham, 1888
- Prepopharus Erichson, 1847
- Rhynchothonius Crotch, 1876
- Scaphengis Gorham, 1888
- Scaphidomorphus
- Sphenoxus Lacordaire, 1842
- Strongylosomus Chevrolat, 1837 (= Coccimorphus)
- Tapinotarsus Kirsch, 1865
- Thonius Lacordaire, 1842
- Zonarius (= Oligocorynus)

== Further reading and external links ==
- Arnett, R.H. Jr.; Thomas, M. C.; Skelley, P. E.; Frank, J. H., eds. (2002). American Beetles, Volume II: Polyphaga: Scarabaeoidea through Curculionoidea. CRC Press LLC, Boca Raton, FL.
- Arnett, Ross H. (2000). American Insects: A Handbook of the Insects of America North of Mexico. CRC Press.
- White, Richard E. (1983). Peterson Field Guides: Beetles. Houghton Mifflin Company.
