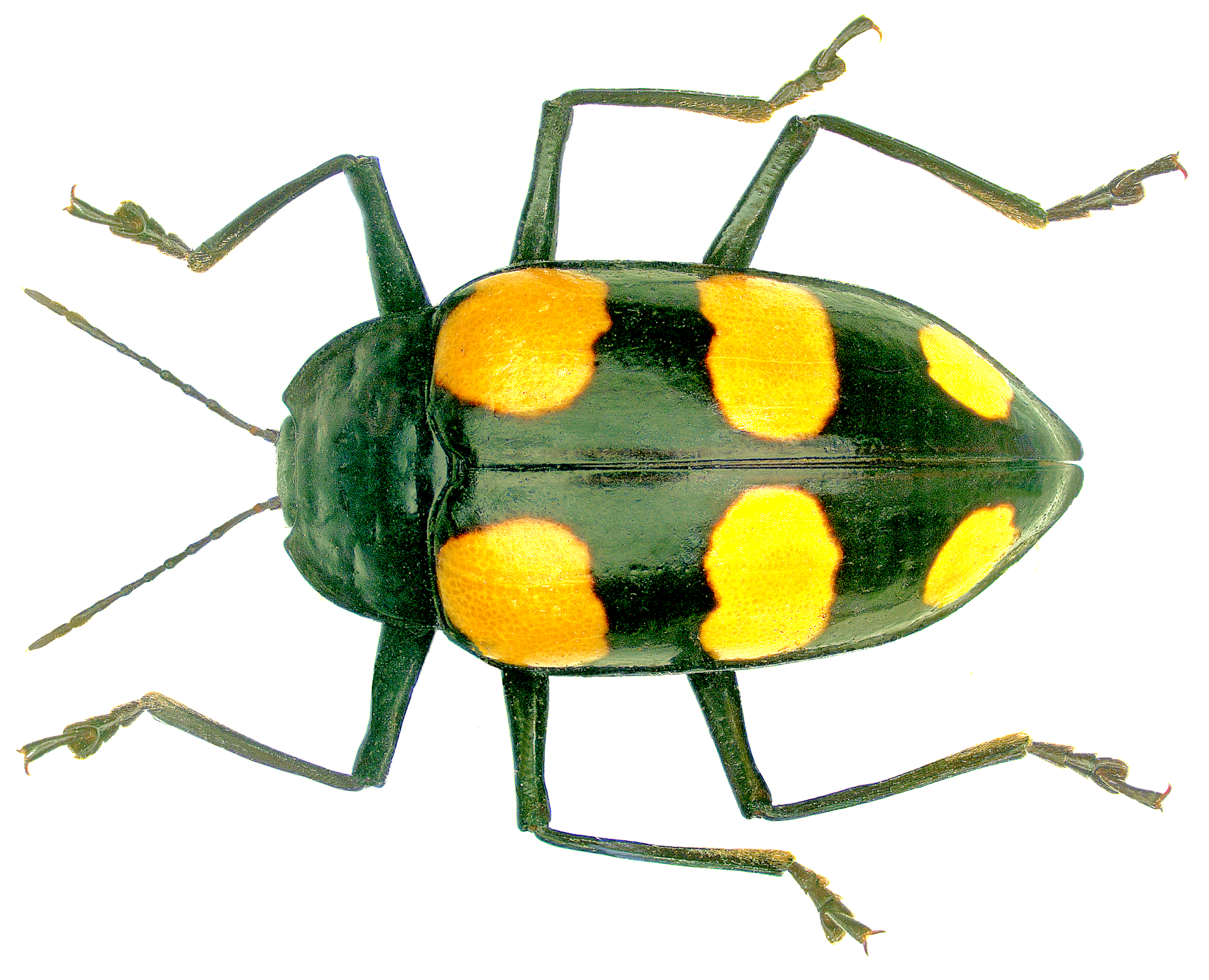
- Scaphidomorphus bosci adult specimen

Scientific classification
- Kingdom: Animalia
- Phylum: Arthropoda
- Clade: Pancrustacea
- Class: Insecta
- Order: Coleoptera
- Suborder: Polyphaga
- Infraorder: Cucujiformia
- Family: Erotylidae
- Genus: Scaphidomorphus; Hope, 1841

= Scaphidomorphus =

Genus of beetles

Scaphidomorphus is a genus of pleasing fungus beetles (family Erotylidae). It belongs to subfamily Erotylinae. The members of this genus are found in the Neotropics lowlands, from Panama to northern Argentina.

Most species formerly placed here are now in Prepopharus, which most obviously differs in having a keeled prosternum. This left Scaphidomorphus a small genus, with only three species:

- Scaphidomorphus bosci Guérin-Méneville, 1841
- Scaphidomorphus quinquepunctatus (Linnaeus, 1767)
- Scaphidomorphus tripunctatus Guérin, 1946
