= National symbols of Cuba =

This is a list of the national symbols of Cuba.

== National symbols ==
Title	Symbol	Image	Notes
National flag	Flag of Cuba	Flag of Cuba	A 1:2 rectangular flag, consisting of five blue and white alternating horizontal stripes, with a red equilateral triangle at the hoist, bearing a white, five-pointed star in its center. It was designed by Narciso López and Miguel Teurbe Tolón, and adopted on May 20, 1849.
National emblem	Coat of arms of Cuba	Coat of arms of Cuba	Crest: In place of a crest, atop a fasces, a red phrygian cap charged with a Mullet of five points Argent. Escutcheon: Per pale, the first bendy sinister of five Azure and Argent; the second a landscape with a palmtree and two mountains in the distance, all proper; and on a chief under a rising sun a strait closed by a golden key, all proper. Supporters: Oak branch, laurel wreath, and sunset.
National anthem	La Bayamesa		Adopted as the national anthem in 1902, La Bayamesa was written and composed by Perucho Figueredo during the Battle of Bayamo.
National motto	"Patria o Muerte"		Translated in English as "Homeland or Death"
National currency	Cuban peso		The Cuban peso is the only currency used in Cuba effective November 2020. Previously there were two currencies, the other being convertible peso. State workers generally receive their wages in Cuban pesos (CUP). Most non-essential goods are bought and sold using CUP, and luxury items, and those aimed at tourists, were usually bought using CUC (convertible pesos).
National hero	José Martí	MartiJohnManuel K TRestauration	José Julián Martí Pérez (January 28, 1853 – May 19, 1895) was a Cuban poet, essayist, revolutionairy philosopher, translator, professor, publisher, and political theorist, as well as a noted Freemason and Georgist. Through his writing and political works, he became a symbol for Cuba's bid for independence from Spain in the 19th century. He promoted the ideas of liberty, political independence for Cuba, and intellectual independence for all Spanish Americans. Sometimes referred to as the "Apostle of Cuban Independence," he died in military action at the Battle of Dos Rios on May 19, 1895. His legacy continues, through UNESCO's International José Martí Prize, and he has been adopted as a symbol of both the Communist Party of Cuba, as well as the Cuban exiles.
Patron Saint	La Virgen de la Caridad de Cobre	OurLadyofCarity	La Virgen de la Caridad de Cobre, or Our Lady of Charity, is a popular Marian title of the Blessed Virgin Mary. She was declared Patroness of Cuba by Pope Benedict XV on May 10, 1916. In Cuba, she is often syncretized with Oshun, the orisha of beauty, love, fertility, sexuality, fresh water, and luxury.
National flower	White Mariposa	Hedychium coronarium by Wilder	The White Mariposa, or Jasmine Butterfly, is a subspecies of Hedychium coronarium, native to the Himalayas, which grows plentifully in the mountains of Cuba. During the Spanish Colonial era, women would use the flowers to adorn their hair, and later during the Cuban War of Independence, women would use the plant's intricate inflorescence to carry secret messages.
National tree	Royal Palm		The Royal Palm is a large, ornamental species of palm tree, native to the Caribbean, and the mainland surrounding it. The tree has great significance in Santería, in which it is associated with the orisha Changó and his father, Aganyú. In Roman Catholicism, the Royal Palm's leaves are commonly used in Palm Sunday observances.
National bird	Tocororo	Priotelus temnurus -Camaguey, Camaguey Province, Cuba-8	The Tocororo, or Cuban Trogon, is a forest-dwelling bird species endemic to Cuba, with a colorful plumage featuring a green back, a blue crest, a red belly and beak, and a white throat and chest. When seen from the front, these colors mimic those found on the Cuban flag, which is why it was chosen as the national bird of the country. Its Spanish name (Tocororo) is derived from its most common call.
National instrument	Cuban Tres	Tres cubano	Originating in Cuba, the tres is a guitar-like three-course chordophone, popular in Afro-Cuban music genres. Each course in the Cuban version features two strings, as opposed to the later Puerto Rican version, where each course features three strings.
National dance	Danzón	CCMDonation25	Both the official music and dance of Cuba, the danzón is a slow, formal partner dance requiring set footwork, and incorporates pauses, as the couples listen to instrumental passages. The danzón evolved from Cuban contradanza, which itself evolved from European dances, introduced to Cuba by the Spanish, and influenced by African rhythm and dance. The creation of Danzón as a distinct music genre is generally credited to Miguel Failde, with his Las laturas de Simpson, composed in 1879.
National sport	Baseball	Norberto González on March 9, 2013	Baseball was introduced to Cuba during the Cuban War of Independence against Spain, after the United States intervention and the formation of the US Protectorate over Cuba. Since then, it has continued to remain a popular sport in the country.
National dish	Ropa vieja	Cubanfood	Spanish for old clothes, ropa vieja is a dish made of shredded flank steak, stewed with some onions and garlic in a tomato base.
National fruit	Mamey sapote		The Mamey sapote, or mamey colorado, is a berry cultivated and consumed in multiple South American and Caribbean countries. The skin is brown, with texture ranging from that of sandpaper to that of a ripe peach, and the meat is salmon-colored and soft. The fruit is commonly used to make milkshakes, smoothies, ice cream, and baked goods.
