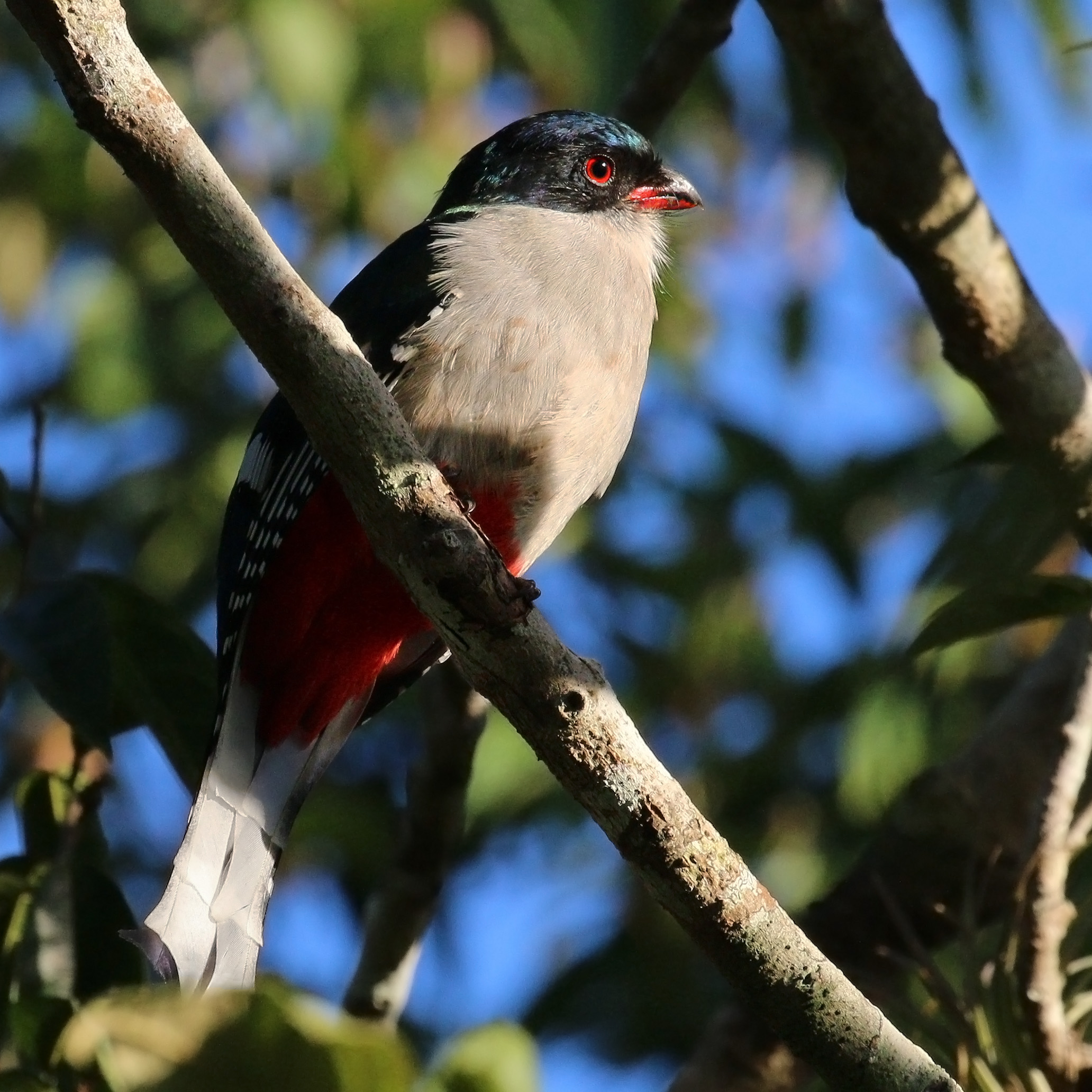
- A tocororo in Viñales Valley, Cuba

Conservation status
- Least Concern (IUCN 3.1)

Scientific classification
- Kingdom: Animalia
- Phylum: Chordata
- Class: Aves
- Order: Trogoniformes
- Family: Trogonidae
- Genus: Priotelus
- Species: P. temnurus

Binomial name
- Priotelus temnurus (Temminck, 1825)

= Cuban trogon =

Species of bird

The Cuban trogon or tocororo (Priotelus temnurus) is a species of bird in the family Trogonidae. It is endemic to Cuba, where it is also the national bird.

== Taxonomy and systematics ==
The Cuban trogon shares its genus with the Hispaniolan trogon (P. roseigaster). It has two subspecies, the nominate P. t. temnurus and P. t. vescus.

In Cuban Spanish, the bird is known as the tocororo, derived from its onomatopoeic call of "toco-toco-tocoro-tocoro".

It is the national bird of Cuba.

== Description ==
is 23 to 28 cm (9.1 to 11 in) long and weighs 47 to 75 g (1.7 to 2.6 oz). Its plumage colors match those of Cuba's flag, and are the same for both sexes. The two subspecies also differ only slightly. Their beak is reddish pink with a dark culmen. Adults have a blackish face with reddish eyes, a dark metallic blue crown and nape, and a metallic green back and rump. Their cheeks, chin, and throat are white becoming clear gray on the breast and upper belly. Their lower belly and undertail coverts are red. Their tail is graduated, with the innermost feathers forming a point. The three innermost pairs of tail feathers are glossy blue-black with some bronzy highlights. The three outer pairs have blue-black bases and are mostly white beyond. The flight feathers and wing coverts are generally dark metallic green to black with a complex pattern of white spots. Juveniles have similar plumage to adults but generally are duller, with buffy gray underparts and reddish pink undertail coverts.

== Distribution and habitat ==
The nominate subspecies of the Cuban trogon is found throughout the main island of Cuba and on several large cays off the Camagüey Province shore. P. t. vescus is found only on Isla de la Juventud. The species inhabits both primary and secondary forest and also shrublands and smaller woodlands near watercourses. It favors humid shady areas within those landscapes and occurs at all elevations but is most common at higher ones.

== Behavior ==
=== Movement ===
The Cuban trogan is mostly sedentary but makes seasonal local movements in elevation or in response to the availability of food. Their flight style is rather choppy and noisy.

=== Social behavior ===
The Cuban trogon is usually found in pairs though sometimes in groups of three or four. They seem "indifferent to human presence in the immediate vicinity."

=== Feeding ===
The Cuban trogon usually forages at the middle level of the forest; it takes food by sallying from a perch or by hovering at foliage or fruit. Its diet is mostly insects, fruit, and buds but it also feeds small lizards to young.

=== Breeding ===
The Cuban trogon's breeding season is mostly April to July. It nests in natural cavities or abandoned woodpecker holes, usually in trees but sometimes in arboreal termitaria. The clutch size is three or four eggs. The incubation period is about 18 days and fledging occurs about 21 days after hatch

=== Vocalization ===
The Cuban trogon's song is "a pleasant toco-toco-tocoro-tocoro..., repeated for long periods at frequent intervals." It also gives "a steady, rapid series of staccato notes" and "a low and short mournful call that makes it difficult to locate."

== Status ==
The IUCN has assessed the Cuban trogon as being of Least Concern. It has a large range, but nonetheless, its population size is not known and is believed to be decreasing. No immediate threats have been identified. It is considered common and widespread throughout the main island of Cuba, but is rare on the small offshore cays and uncommon on Isla de la Juventud. Deforestation and habitat loss are two of the greatest threats to the Cuban trogon.

== Cultural significance ==
The Cuban trogon has appeared on Cuban stamps, as well as on Cuban money.

== Gallery ==
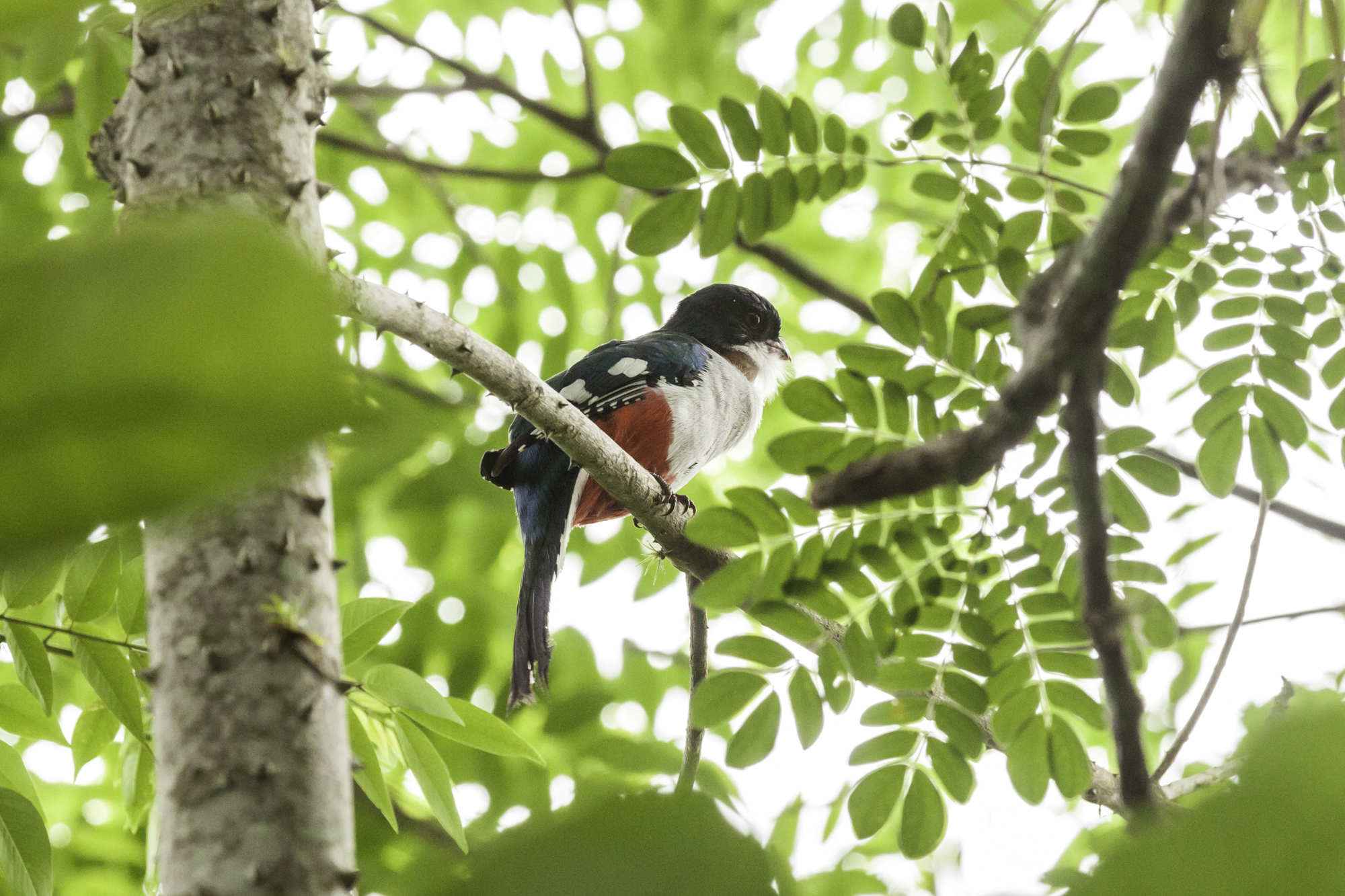
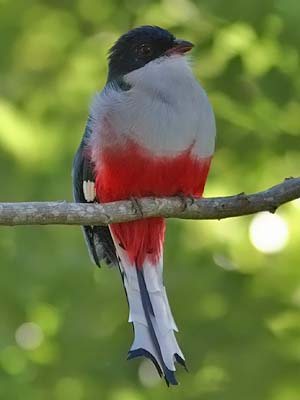
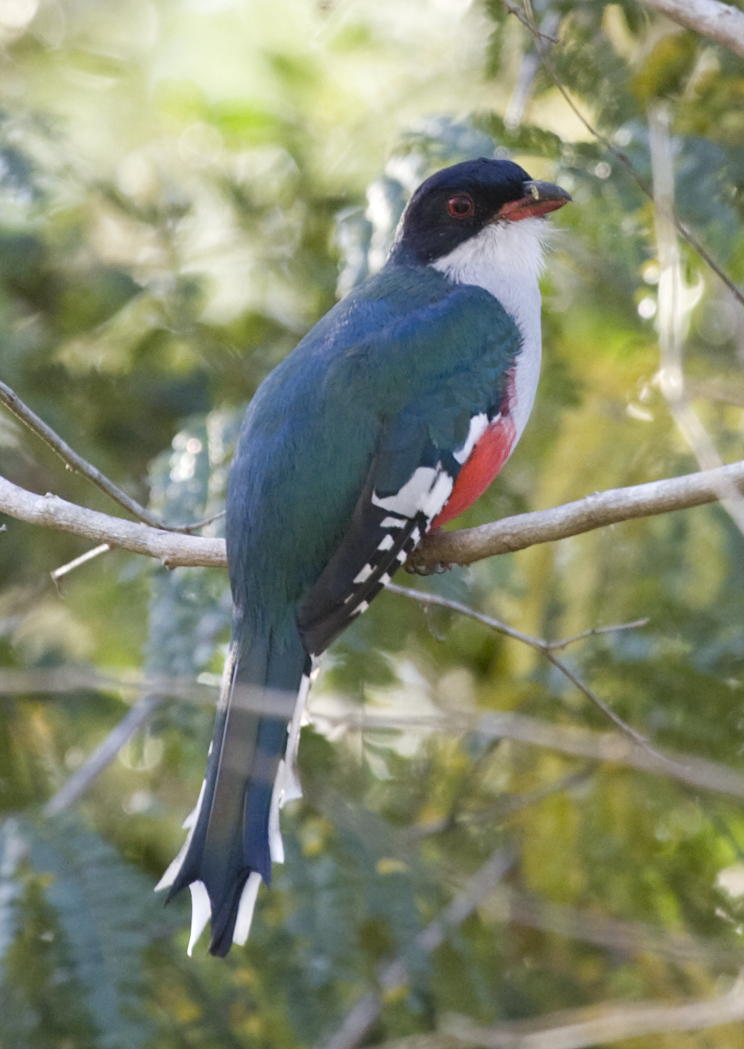
