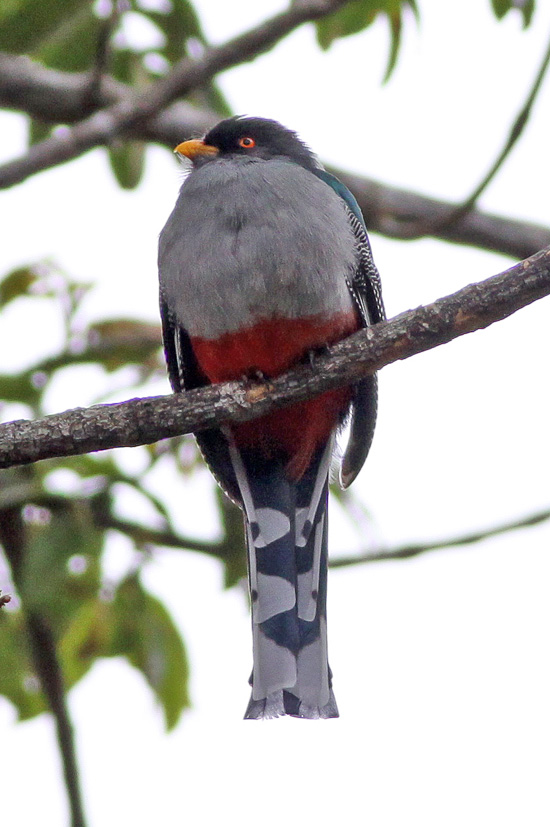
- In Sierra de Bahoruco National Park, Dominican Republic

Conservation status
- Least Concern (IUCN 3.1)

Scientific classification
- Kingdom: Animalia
- Phylum: Chordata
- Class: Aves
- Order: Trogoniformes
- Family: Trogonidae
- Genus: Priotelus
- Species: P. roseigaster

Binomial name
- Priotelus roseigaster (Vieillot, 1817)
- Range in green

Synonyms
- Temnotrogon roseigaster

= Hispaniolan trogon =

Species of bird endemic to Hispaniola

The Hispaniolan trogon (Priotelus roseigaster, also known as cacos) is a species of bird in the family Trogonidae. It is endemic to Hispaniola in the Caribbean. It is one of the only two trogon species found in the Caribbean. It is the national bird of Haiti.

== Identification ==
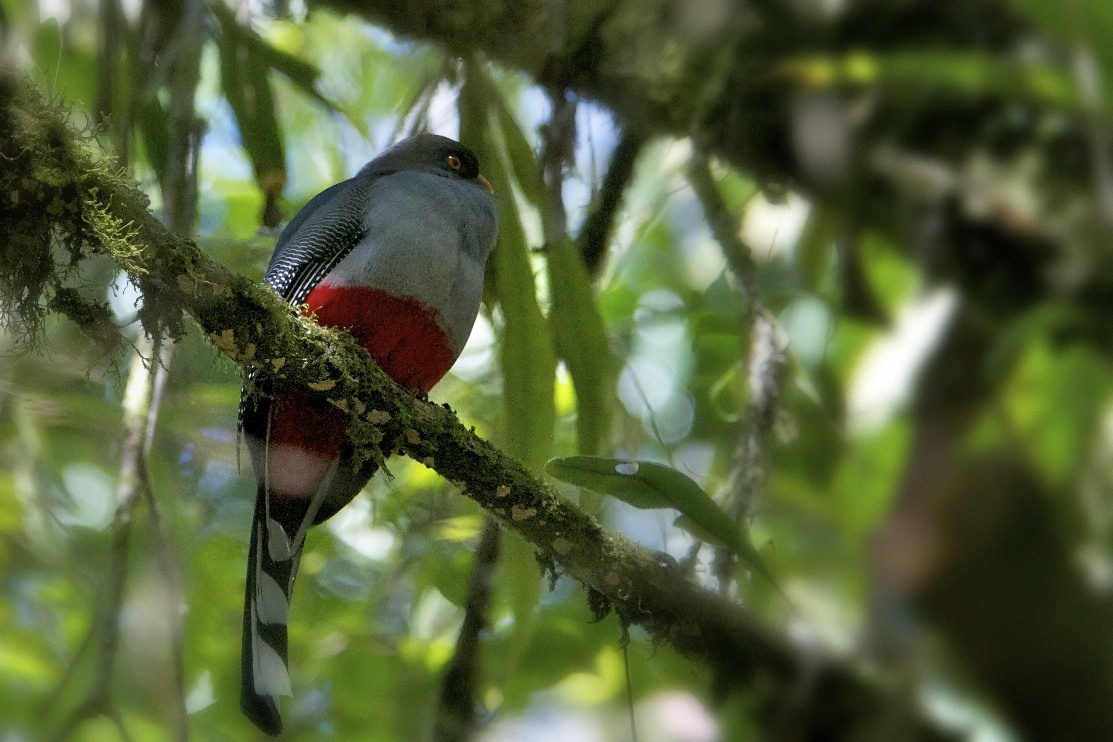
Hispaniolan trogon

Trogons are brightly coloured birds with long, strongly graduated tails, small feet, and short, thick bills. The Hispaniolan trogon has metallic green upper parts, a gray throat and breast, and a red belly and is separated from the closely related Cuban trogon by the more typical tail of this species. The underside of the tail is dark, but each rectrix is broadly tipped with white. Males and females look similar, but the females' wing coverts and secondaries lack the narrow white bars. The male average measurements for wing, tail, culem from base and tarsus are 135.2, 154, 17.3, and 16.8 mm respectively. The female averages are 136.6, 154, 16.5, and 16.4 mm respectively.

== Vocalizations ==
The song is rather slow and can be heard from quite a distance. It has a low rattle.

== Habitat ==
Its natural habitats are subtropical or tropical moist montane forests and heavily degraded forest. It is threatened by habitat loss. It is mostly confined to a few remaining protected areas. It inhabits rain, dry, pine and broadleaved deciduous forests. Several early records included mangrove swamps west of Miragoane but whether these were visitors or a resident population is unknown. It requires large, old decayed trees with holes for nesting. It primarily occurs at elevations of 500–3,000 m, but there appears to be some altitudinal migration with birds observed at lower elevations in winter. In Haiti, it is restricted to the Massif de la Hotte and Chaîne de la Selle, due to extensive habitat loss. It is still quite common in the Dominican Republic, especially in the relatively undisturbed Sierra de Baoruco, although there has been a moderately rapid population reduction, owing to deforestation.

== Diet ==
It is known to mainly eat insects, though it also takes small vertebrates such as anoles and fruits, especially those of the West Indian sumac (Brunellia comocladifolia).

== Behaviour ==
Its foraging behaviour is presumed to be similar to that of other species of trogon: most food is taken in aerial sallies to fruit or to surrounding vegetation. The species primarily forages in the midstory of humid deciduous and pine forests. A study of mixed-species flocks on Hispaniola recorded two encounters with the Hispaniolan trogon, both of which were associated with mixed flocks.

== Reproduction ==
Its breeding season is thought to be March to July. The nest is a cavity in a tree, including cavities of the Hispaniolan woodpecker (Melanerpes striatus). The only known clutches are of two eggs; eggs are pale green and unmarked. Egg measurements ranged from 27.9 by 23.5 mm to 31.4 by 23.9 mm. The lengths of the incubation period and nestling periods are unknown. Generation length is estimated at 7.3 years.

== Population and conservation ==
The Hispaniolan trogon is a forest-dependent species and is vulnerable to habitat loss or degradation. The IUCN Red List conservation status of the Hispaniolan trogon is assessed as Least Concern; however, its population is continuing to decline throughout its small range, owing to forest degradation and fragmentation. Forest loss and fragmentation owing to shifting agriculture are causing a decline, particularly in moist forest areas. Dry forests have been considerably altered by charcoal production, and pine forests have been reduced as a consequence of indiscriminate logging and clear-cutting. In particular, recent habitat destruction along highways has caused a drastic decline of the population in the Cordillera Central, but it is occasionally seen on abandoned coffee farms and old cocoa groves in the Cordillera Septentrional. The species is also subject to hunting. However, as the range is relatively wide and not yet severely fragmented, the species is classified as Least Concern.

Some populations are afforded protection by national parks, such as in the Sierra de Baoruco. Proposed conservation actions include monitoring the population regularly, effectively protecting national parks that hold populations of the species, encouraging forms of agriculture which do not require forest clearance, discouraging charcoal production in native forests, and raising awareness of the uniqueness of the species, as well as discourage hunting.
