= Indian calligraphy =

Practice of calligraphy in India

Indian calligraphy is the Indian tradition of calligraphy. The art form has served multiple purposes since its inception in the second century BCE, including the duplication of religious texts and as a form of basic communication.

== History ==
=== Early calligraphy (2nd century BCE – 6th century CE) ===
Beginning in the 2nd century AD, Indic languages was transferred using birch bark as a writing surface. Locally, the birch bark was called Bhojpatra in India – patra meaning leaf/bark/sheet in Sanskrit. Palm leaves were used as a substitute to paper, even after paper was available for Indic manuscripts. The leaves were commonly used because they were a good surface for pen writing, which created the delicate and decorative handwriting that is known as calligraphy today. Both sides of these leaves were used and they were stacked on top of each other. People then created holes on the leaves and held them together by string, thus creating the early Indian manuscripts, also common in Southeast Asia at the time.

=== Middle Ages (6th century – 16th century) ===
Indian calligraphy took off starting around 500 AD when Indian traders, colonists, military adventurers, Buddhist monks and missionaries brought the Indic script to Central Asia and South East Asia. Different concepts and ideas were being created throughout the late 400s to late 1400s, in a 1000-year span. The Gilgit scripts are the earliest notable form of calligraphy in India that date back to the 5th and 6th centuries. The earliest painted covers of manuscripts were created between the 7th and 9th centuries, and the earliest illustrated manuscript in South Asia was not formed until around the 10th century.

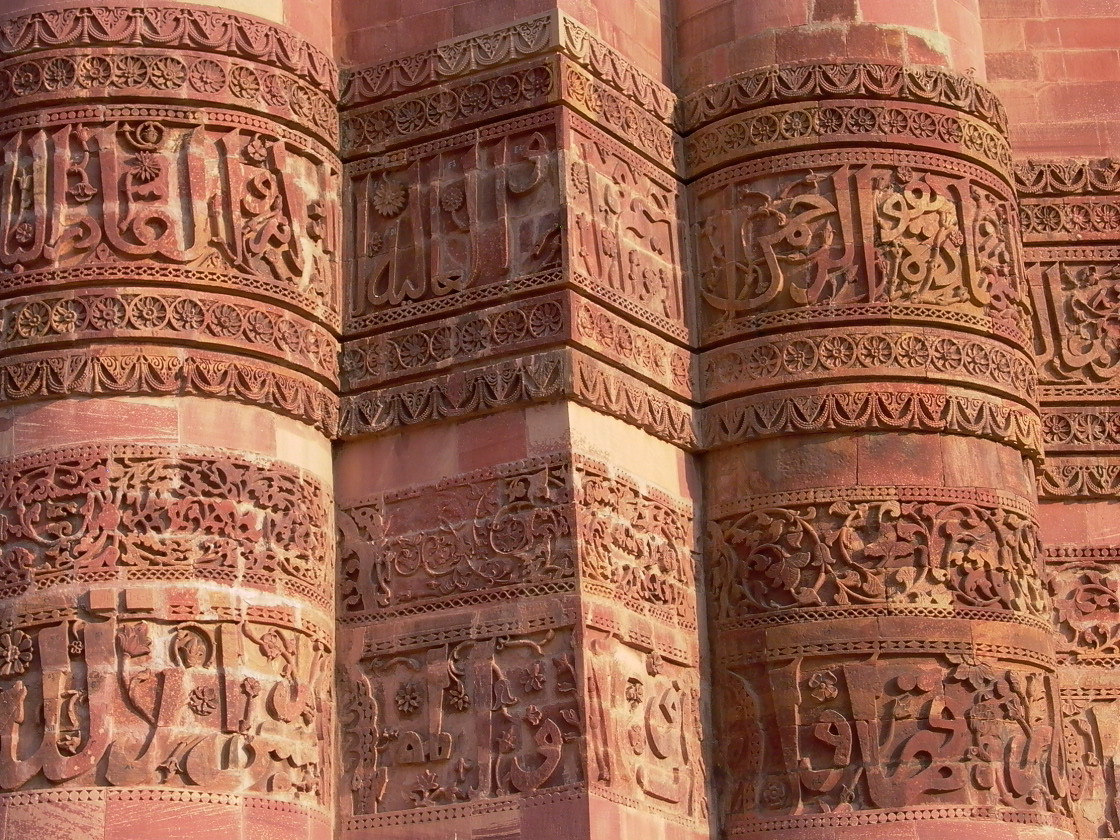
Inscriptions in Arabic calligraphy form regular bands throughout the Qutb Minar, Delhi, built 1192 CE

The languages of South East Asia were influenced by Indic language and culture. The languages that were created came in the form of the basic internal structure, the arrangement and construction of syllabic units, manner of representation of characters, and the direction of writing (left to right). Before this left to right reading, the technique of Pothi was utilized, which is the format of a book that is written vertically. This was useful for the illustrations made in these early manuscripts. Persian influence in Indian calligraphy gave rise to a unique and influential blend in Indian calligraphy, although a number of different calligraphic traditions existed in India already, and Indic scripts were fundamentally different from scripts used in Arabic and Persian traditions. The notable achievements of the Mughals included some of their fine manuscripts, which were usually autobiographies and chronicles of the noble class. They were initially written in flowing Persian script, which was one of the main forms of communication during this time, and which showed a multi-directionality and mutuality of influence on Indic calligraphers.

From the 16th century onwards Sikhism played a key role in the history of Indian calligraphy. Sikhs have traditionally handwritten their holy book, the Guru Granth Sahib, and furnished it with illumination. Sikh calligrapher Pratap Singh Giani (1855–1920) is known for one of the first definitive translations of Sikh scriptures into English.

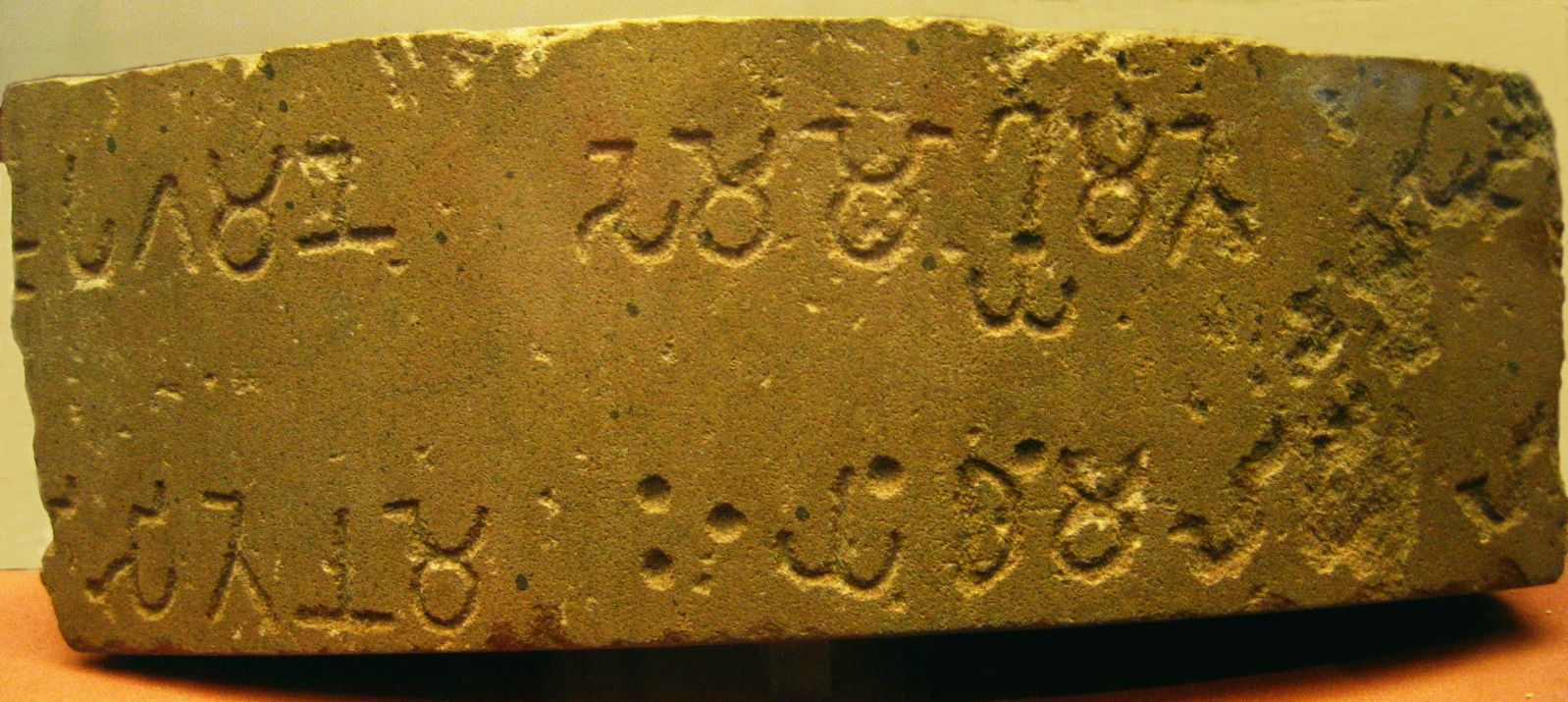
A fragment of Ashoka's 6th pillar edict.

== Features of Indian calligraphy ==
Religious texts are the most frequent vehicle for calligraphy in India. Monastic Buddhist communities had members trained in calligraphy and shared responsibility for duplicating sacred scriptures. Jain traders incorporated illustrated manuscripts celebrating Jain saints. These manuscripts were produced using inexpensive material, like palm leaves and birch, with fine calligraphy.

== See also ==
- Islamic calligraphy
  - Persian calligraphy
