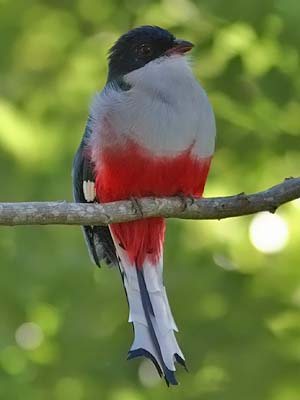
- Cuban trogon

Scientific classification
- Kingdom: Animalia
- Phylum: Chordata
- Class: Aves
- Order: Trogoniformes
- Family: Trogonidae
- Genus: Priotelus; G.R. Gray, 1840

Type species
- Trogon temnurus Temminck, 1825

Species
- P. temnurus P. roseigaster

= Priotelus =

Genus of birds

Priotelus is a genus of birds in the trogon family endemic to Caribbean islands.

== Species ==
It contains two species:

Genus Priotelus – G.R. Gray, 1840 – two species
Common name	Scientific name and subspecies	Range	Size and ecology	IUCN status and estimated population
Hispaniolan trogon	Priotelus roseigaster (Vieillot, 1817)	Hispaniola (Haiti and the Dominican Republic)	Size: Habitat: Diet:	LC
Cuban trogon, tocororo	Priotelus temnurus (Temminck, 1825)	Cuba, Isla de la Juventud	Size: Habitat: Diet:	LC
