= Fragrance oil =

Type of essential oil

Fragrance oils, also known as aroma oils, aromatic oils, and flavor oils, are blended synthetic aroma compounds or natural essential oils that are diluted with a carrier like propylene glycol, vegetable oil, or mineral oil.

To allergic or otherwise sensitive people, synthetic fragrance oils are often less desirable than plant-derived essential oils as components of perfume. Essential oils, widely used in society, emit numerous volatile organic compounds (VOCs). Some of these VOCs are considered as potentially hazardous under federal regulations. Most high quality essential oils are extracted from natural sources such as plants, herbs, and flowers. However, synthetic versions of the same compound as a natural essential oil are usually very comparable. Furthermore, natural oils are in many cases significantly more expensive than their synthetic equivalents.

Aromatic oils are used in perfumery, candles, cosmetics, flavoring of food.

Some include (out of a very diverse range):

- Ylang ylang
- Vanilla
- Sandalwood
- Cedar wood
- Mandarin orange
- Cinnamon
- Lemongrass
- Rosehip
- Peppermint
- Frankincense
- Bergamot
- Patchouli
- Blackcurrant

== Candle fragrance oils ==
Scented candles are produced when fragrance oils are combined with hot wax like paraffin, forming a homogenous solution. Fragrance oils are retained like a sponge when the wax is cooled to room temperature. Lighting the candle wick increases the wax temperature, gradually releasing an aroma through the evaporation of the fragrance oil.

== See also ==
- Perfume
- Essential oil
- Aroma compound
- Fragrance allergy
