= List of Epuraea species =

These are some of the almost 200 species in the genus Epuraea:

- Epuraea adumbrata (Mannerheim, 1852)
- Epuraea aestiva (Linnaeus, 1758)
- Epuraea alternans Grouvelle, 1912
- Epuraea alternata Parsons, 1969
- Epuraea ambigua Mannerheim, 1843
- Epuraea avara (Randall, 1838)
- Epuraea boreella (Zetterstedt, 1828)
- Epuraea californica (Gillogly, 1946)
- Epuraea corticina Erichson, 1843
- Epuraea depressa (Illiger, 1798)
- Epuraea erichsoni Reitter, 1873
- Epuraea eximia Parsons, 1969
- Epuraea flavomaculata Mäklin, 1853
- Epuraea fulvescens Horn, 1879
- Epuraea guttata (Olivier, 1790)
- Epuraea helvola Erichson, 1843
- Epuraea horni Crotch, 1874
- Epuraea integra Horn, 1879
- Epuraea labilis Erichson, 1843
- Epuraea lengi Parsons, 1969
- Epuraea linearis Mäklin, 1853
- Epuraea luteola Erichson, 1843 – pineapple sap beetle
- Epuraea macrophthalma Reitter, 1873
- Epuraea melanocephala (Marsham, 1802)
- Epuraea monogama (Crotch, 1874)
- Epuraea munda (Sharp, 1878)
- Epuraea nearctica
- Epuraea obliquus Hatch, 1962
- Epuraea obtusicollis Reitter, 1873
- Epuraea ocularis Fairmaire, 1849
- Epuraea pallescens (Stephens, 1830)
- Epuraea papagona Casey, 1884
- Epuraea parsonsi Connell, 1981
- Epuraea peltoides Horn, 1879
- Epuraea planulata Erichson, 1843
- Epuraea populi Dodge, 1939
- Epuraea quadricollis
- Epuraea rectangula Connell, 1981
- Epuraea rufa (Say, 1825)
- Epuraea rufida (Melsheimer, 1846)
- Epuraea rufomarginata (Stephens, 1830)
- Epuraea scaphoides Horn, 1879
- Epuraea terminalis Mannerheim, 1843
- Epuraea truncatella Mannerheim, 1846
- Epuraea umbrosa Horn, 1879
