= Hapalips =

Scientific classification
- Kingdom: Animalia
- Phylum: Arthropoda
- Clade: Pancrustacea
- Class: Insecta
- Order: Coleoptera
- Suborder: Polyphaga
- Infraorder: Cucujiformia
- Family: Erotylidae
- Subfamily: Xenoscelinae
- Genus: Hapalips; Reitter, 1877

Type species
- Hapalips mexicanus Reitter, 1877

Synonyms
- Cavophorus Sen Gupta, 1968; Isolanguria Lea, 1929; Loberina Grouvelle, 1902; Xenosceloides Sen Gupta, 1968

Genus of beetles

Hapalips is a nondescript-looking but quite diverse genus of pleasing fungus beetles (family Erotylidae). Some authors place this genus in subfamily Loberinae, others accept fewer subfamilies in the Erotylidae and merge the Loberinae into subfamily Xenoscelinae as tribe Loberini.

Hapalips adults have a rather long, narrow, and flat body, with fairly parallel sides. At a casual glance, they resemble Xenoscelis. The closely related monotypic genus Truquiella is very similar to and may easily be confused with Hapalips; it might warrant merging here.

== Description ==
=== Adult ===
The very similar (and possibly not generically distinct) Truquiella gibbifera can be distinguished from Hapalips species by having a hump between each compound eye and the "forehead" region, and very indistinct prebasal impressions on the pronotum.

Head
On the top of the head, there is no transverse line, and neither a suture between forehead and the conspicuously wide clypeus with a smoothly rounded tip. However, the forward throat region has a transverse groove, and in some species even a deepened three-lobed cavity. File-like head structures to produce squeaking sounds are only present in a few species, where they form a widely-separated pair, but this may consist (e.g. in H.acaciae and H.juscus) of mere smooth ridges with no grinding structures. The antennae is moderately long, its insertions are completely hidden by the forehead plate. The first three antenna segments are small, with the second and sometimes also the third being even smaller than the already diminutive first segment. Antenna segments 4-8 are roughly equal in length, and antenna segments 9-11 form a "club" of equal width, with the last (11th) antenna segment forming a broad rounded cap. The mandible has a well-developed mola, the maxilla a lacinia with three spines at the tip and a long and narrow galea. The end segment of the labial palps is short and wide.

Body and wings
The prothorax is at least as long as wide, with almost parallel sides and blunt corners; notably, in some species of this genus males and females can be distinguished by pronotal shape. The pronotum has distinct but shallow prebasal impressions, and the prosternal process has a straight tip. The episternal pockets of the middle thorax segment are usually obscured. The metasternum is slightly longer than wide, with no mesocoxal lines, and an impressed centerline running for at least two-thirds its length, and the endosternite's anterior tendons separated by slightly less than the width of basal stalk and the lateral plates narrow. The elytra have an outer margin which is well-defined up to the wingtip, regular lengthwise lines formed by small punctuations, and usually a scutellary striole; they are hairless or have a fine fuzz of flat-lying hairs. The hindwings have four anal veins, an r-m crossvein, a radial cell (usually with spur of the radial sector) but in some species no anal cell, and a subcubital fleck. The underside of the first abdominal segment has a narrow and pointed process extending forward between the hindleg attachment points, as well as femoral lines. Male and female genitalia can be used to recognize members of this genus.

Legs
The attachment points of the forelegs are have a narrowed opening to the back, in some species reduced to a slit; the midleg coxae almost meet in the mesosternal centerline. The tarsi are short and thick, with the first three segments wide and of roughly equal size; segment 3 has a broad lobe on the underside which covers the tiny segment 4. Tarsal segment 5 is elongated, almost equal in length to the first three segments (without the lobe) together. The trochanters are broadly elongated; the tibiae are sthorened, with a wide flaring tip that is obliquely cut off and bears two spurs.

=== Larva ===
The larvae of several species are known; they are slim and somewhat flattened, pointed at the ends, and with small bumps arranged in neat lines and rows on the back which are surrounded by larger bristly warts on each side. In this skin ornamentation, they resemble the larvae of Bolerus angulosus and Loberus impressus, and they also share a lack of conspicuous seams on the head capsule. The larva of H.prolixus grows to at least 3.5 mm long (about 0.65 mm of which are the slender head), and about 0.6 mm wide. Their legs are fairly large compared to related genera, bear simple claws, and are attached close together. The mouthparts are well-developed, with a mandibular prostheca that is translucent between apical teeth and mola but without hairy appendage at the mola base. They have a handful of ocelli behind the short antenna on each side of the head, but in some species the ocelli are vestigial, probably rendering the larvae blind. On the tarsal claws, H.prolixus larvae have pairs of bristles, one notably shorter than the other. This situation is intermediate between many less closely related Erotylidae (which have bristle pairs of roughly equal length), and B.angulosus and L.impressus which have single tarsus claw bristles. The urogomphi are more or less elongated depending on species, while the pygopod is apparently generally not well-developed in larvae of this genus.

== Distribution and ecology ==
Hapalips are found almost all subtropical and tropical regions of the world, but are apparently less widespread in Australasia. By Erotylidae standards, they are remarkably capable of colonizing offshore islands, with species having been reported from New Zealand, the Seychelles, and across the Caribbean. In temperate regions, the genus is almost absent; in the USA, for example, they are only regularly seen in Florida, with occurrences elsewhere probably due to human introductions.

The ecology of this large genus remains seriously understudied, particularly since it seems to contain some potential crop pests. Unlike typical pleasing fungus beetles, Hapalips are not generally associated with mushrooms growing on dicot or conifer wood. Instead,, most records with any sort of habitat information associate them with diverse monocots: H.filum was found in stalks of maize (Zea mays, Poaceae), an undetermined American Hapalips at the base of a non-native Araceae (probably Alocasia) in Florida, and H.championi, H.prolixus and H.scotti were all reported from under the bases of old palm leaves (Arecaceae). Possibly; they eat pollen and/or spores; as regards associations with non-monocots, H.prolixus was also found in tree ferns (perhaps indicating they use the leaves primarily for shelter), an unidentified Australian Hapalips was collected from pollen cones of a Cycas gymnosperm, and H.annulosus was encountered in the flowers of Selenicereus triangularis (Cactaceae).

Larval development is not well understood. The larvae of H.prolixus were found under the same nīkau palm (Rhopalostylis sapida) leaves as the adults.

== Systematics ==
As originally established by Edmund Reitter in 1877, this genus was placed in family Rhizophagidae (now Monotomidae). In the early 20th century, its placement was contested between family Cryptophagidae and the supposed lizard beetle family "Languriidae". The latter view prevailed, and in the "languriid" assemblage Hapalips was variously affiliated with such genera as Bolerus, Cladoxena, Leucohimatium, Loberus and Toramus. However, by the mid-20th century experts started to note that Hapalips was something of a "missing link" between the lizard beetles and the pleasing fungus beetles. By the end of the 20th century, doubts about the distinctness of the "Languriidae" were mounting, and eventually the presumed family was determined to be paraphyletic with the pleasing fungus beetles; consequently, it was merged into Erotylidae. Of the "languriids" with which it was formerly allied, Bolerus and Loberus seem to be closely related to Hapalips, while the others are more distant.

Reitter listed a number of species for his new genus, but did not designate a type species. This was rectified in 1968, when the common H.mexicanus was chosen from Reitter's list as the genus type.

=== Selected species ===
As of 1998, 57 species were named in genus Hapalips. They include:

- Hapalips acaciae Sen Gupta, 1968
- Hapalips angulosus Grouvelle, 1908
- Hapalips annulosus Grouvelle
- Hapalips bicolor Bruce, 1954
- Hapalips championi Grouvelle
- Hapalips cribricollis Gorham
- Hapalips curta Grouvelle, 1919
- Hapalips delauneyi Grouvelle, 1908
- Hapalips dufaui Grouvelle, 1908
- Hapalips eichelbaumi Grouvelle, 1908
- Hapalips filum Reitter
- Hapalips fuscus Reitter 1877
- Hapalips grouvelli Gorham
- Hapalips guadeloupensis Grouvelle, 1902
- Hapalips hispidus Bruce, 1952
- Hapalips investigatus Leschen & Wegrzynowicz, 1998 (= H.fuscus (Lea, 1929) nec Reitter, 1877: preoccupied)
- Hapalips juscus Reitter
- Hapalips kivuensis Bruce, 1952
- Hapalips lucudus Champion
- Hapalips mexicanus Reitter 1877
- Hapalips nigriceps Reitter
- Hapalips nitidulus Champion
- Hapalips prolixus (Sharp, 1876)
- Hapalips samoensis Arrow, 1927
- Hapalips scotti Grouvelle
- Hapalips sculpticollis Champion
- Hapalips sharpi Grouvelle, 1908
- Hapalips spegazzini Bruch, 1919 (tentatively placed here)
- Hapalips taprobanae (Grouvelle, 1902)
- Hapalips texanus Schaeffer, 1910

Three subgenera have been proposed:

- Hapalips (Cavophorus) Sen Gupta, 1968 for the group around H.fuscus, e.g. H.acaciae. Distinguished by the vestigial stridulation ridges on the head, and the deep three-lobed throat groove.
- Hapalips (Hapalips) Reitter 1877 for the group around H.mexicanus (the bulk of the genus).
- Hapalips (Xenosceloides) Sen Gupta, 1968 for the group around H.prolixus, e.g. H.filum, H.scotti, and possibly H.taprobanae (in which case the subgenus name becomes Loberina). The most flattened and parallel-sided species, also distinguished by lacking the anal cell in the hindwings and decreased size of both compound eyes and individual ommatidia.

In addition, as remarked above, the genus Truquiella is very similar to Hapalips and might be included here as the most basal member (and forming a monotypic subgenus). Conversely, Hapalips spegazzini males have an aedeagus quite unlike any other known in this genus, and that species might not belong here.
