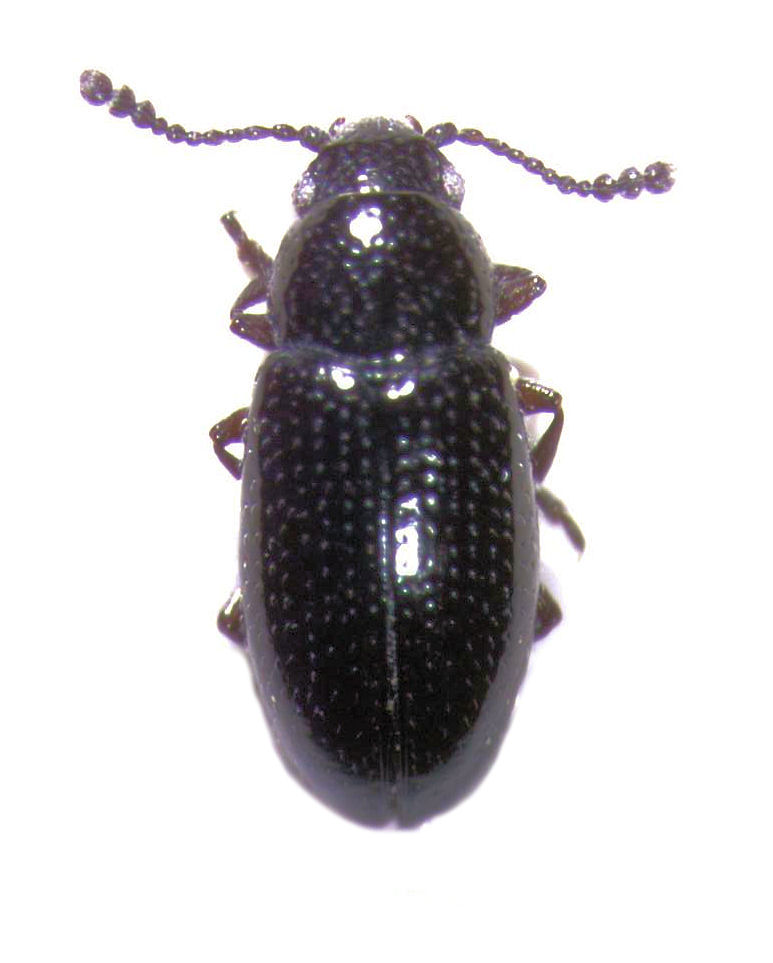
- Loberus anthracinus adult from Canterbury Region, New Zealand

Scientific classification
- Kingdom: Animalia
- Phylum: Arthropoda
- Clade: Pancrustacea
- Class: Insecta
- Order: Coleoptera
- Suborder: Polyphaga
- Infraorder: Cucujiformia
- Family: Erotylidae
- Subfamily: Xenoscelinae
- Genus: Loberus; LeConte, 1861

Type species
- Loberus impressus LeConte, 1863

Synonyms
- Glisonotha Motschulsky, 1863; Glysonotha (lapsus)

= Loberus =

Genus of beetles

Loberus is a sizeable genus of pleasing fungus beetles (family Erotylidae) found in most parts of the world (though they are scarce in temperate Eurasia). Some authors place this genus in subfamily Loberinae, others accept fewer subfamilies in the Erotylidae and merge the Loberinae into subfamily Xenoscelinae as tribe Loberini.

Initially placed in family Cryptophagidae, subsequent authors usually allied Loberus with the lizard beetles, at that time held to be a distinct family "Languriidae". This was eventually revealed to be paraphyletic with Erotylidae and merged into these.

== Description ==
Loberus are small beetles with dark color and a more or less flattened body.

Head
The head of these beetles is reminiscent of family Cryptophagidae, where Loberus was originally placed; in most if not all species it has file-like structures at the rear of the neck, which, when rubbed against the adjacent carapace, produce squeaking sounds. On the top of the head, there is no transverse line, and neither a suture between clypeus and forehead; however, the forward throat region has a prominent transverse groove which extends to the sides of the head. The compound eyes are large, with ommatidia of moderate size, suggesting a crepuscular lifestyle. The tip of the clypeus is straightly cut-off. The antennae insertions are hidden by the forehead plate, with the first and third antenna segment both longer than the second. Antenna segments 4-8 are equal in length, and antenna segments 9-11 form a "club", with segment 9 much wider than segment 8, segment 10 a bit wider still and also markedly longer; the last (11th) antenna segment is a small nub, slightly longer than wide, and with an asymmetrically rounded tip. The mandible has a well-developed mola, the maxilla a lacinia with thee spines at the tip and a long and narrow galea. The end segment of the labial palps is short and wide.

Body
The prothorax is wider than long, with slightly curving sides and a smooth keel, and just a bit wider in the back than in the front. The pronotum has prebasal impressions, and the prosternal process is narrow, with an almost straight tip. The cavities where the foreleg coxae attach are entirely closed, and the rear margin of the prosternal process is entirely smooth and lacks a notch. On the mesothorax, the episternal pockets are well developed, as are the rests for the foreleg coxae. In some species of Loberus, there is a row of clearly visible punctures on the mesosternum, which form a line with their forward edges and each bear a bristle; the mesosternal process is parallel-sided. The joint between meso- and metasternum does not have a double knob. The metasternum is wider than it is long, with no mesocoxal lines, and the impressed centerline ending at midpoint. The metasternal endosternite has anterior tendons separated by slightly less than the width of basal stalk, and narrow lateral plates.

The underside of the first abdominal segment has a triangular process extending forward between the hindleg attachment points, as well as femoral lines. In males, the ventrites of the abdomen have distinct bristly patches which contain pores. While the male genitalia are characteristic, the female ones resemble those of related genera, with styli attached at the coxites' apex.

Wings and legs
The elytra lack a scutellary striole but have an outer margin which is narrow but well-defined almost up to the wingtip, where it becomes obscure. While some Loberus species have smooth and almost bare elytra, in most species they are covered in short hairs which lie flat; some of the hairy-winged species also have longer curved bristles scattered between the hairs. Small punctuations form lengthwise lines on the elytra of most species, but in some the elytra punctuation are distributed in a more random pattern. The hindwings have four anal veins, an r-m crossvein, a subcubital spot and an anal cell. Vein CuA2+3+4+AA1+2 foes not contact the submedial spot. Sources differ on whether a radial cell is present, possibly indicating differences between species.

The attachment points of the forelegs are internally wide open, and somewhat more closed externally, and the midleg coxae almost meet in the mesosternal centerline. The trochanters are broadly elongated; the tibiae are narrow throughout, without flaring tips, but on the forelegs they have widely-spaced spines on the outer margin. The first segment of the tarsi is barely longer than the second, and the third segment has a narrow lobe on the underside. Tarsal segment 4 is tiny, and segment 5 is elongated, almost equal in length to the first three segments (without the lobe) together.

Larvae
Larvae of these beetles were first described in 2000. At a quick glance, the larvae of L.impressus resemble those of Pharaxonotha. Unlike those, they have no prominent seams on their head capsules; this trait is shared with the larvae of Bolerus angulosus and Hapalips prolixus, which resemble those of L.impressus in various anatomical details (such as the surface ornamentation pattern of tiny grains or larger warts) and are likely very close relatives. Notably, B.angulosus larvae, like those of L.impressus, have single instead of the usual paired bristles on their tarsal claws. On the maxillary jaw of L.impressus, there is an unusual triple arrangement of strong bristles; this seems to resemble a structure described in Zavaljus brunneus larvae, but if this is indeed so and what these structures are, requires further study.

== Distribution and ecology ==
Loberus is a widespread genus, but absent from temperate Eurasia west of East Asia. They are predominantly found in warmer climates, and species have been reported from all continents, Madagascar, and New Zealand (though the latter were only moved to this genus fairly recently).

More than 150 years after the establishment of genus Loberus, the ecology of these beetles remains almost unknown; they are generally found in molding plant debris such as leaf litter. The larvae of L.impressus were found in old Dixie iris (Iris hexagona) seedpods that had opened to shed their seeds or were attacked by acrobat ants (Crematogaster), as well as in decaying flower remains of the same plant. L.impressus was otherwise associated on I.hexagona with Erotylidae of genus Toramus and various other beetles representing families from all across the Cucujiformia. However, all these were only ever found in insignificant numbers, while L.impressus and the ants were regularly encountered on the iris.

It was observed that the bore-holes of the ants permitted the beetles entry into the thick-walled seedpods before they opened naturally. However, the beetle and their larvae did not seem to eat the seeds. Rather, as typical for their family they feed on fungi that infest the decaying plant tissue. Adults were found to carry Cladosporium and Fusarium spores on their exoskeleton, and the long strands of frass deposited by L.impressus contain remains of fungal hyphae and spores, from which an unidentifed Cladosporium could be raised.

The time spent as pupa is roughly a month or a bit more. An attempt to raise L.impressus larvae in the lab with old I.hexagona flower tissue was not very successful; only one adult beetle hatched from 7 late-stage larvae collected from the wild about 6 weeks earlier. Adults apparently were able to live on the same tissue for some time, but did not reproduce.

== Selected species ==
In 1998, more than 70 species were recognized in this genus, and some additional ones have been discovered since then. They include:

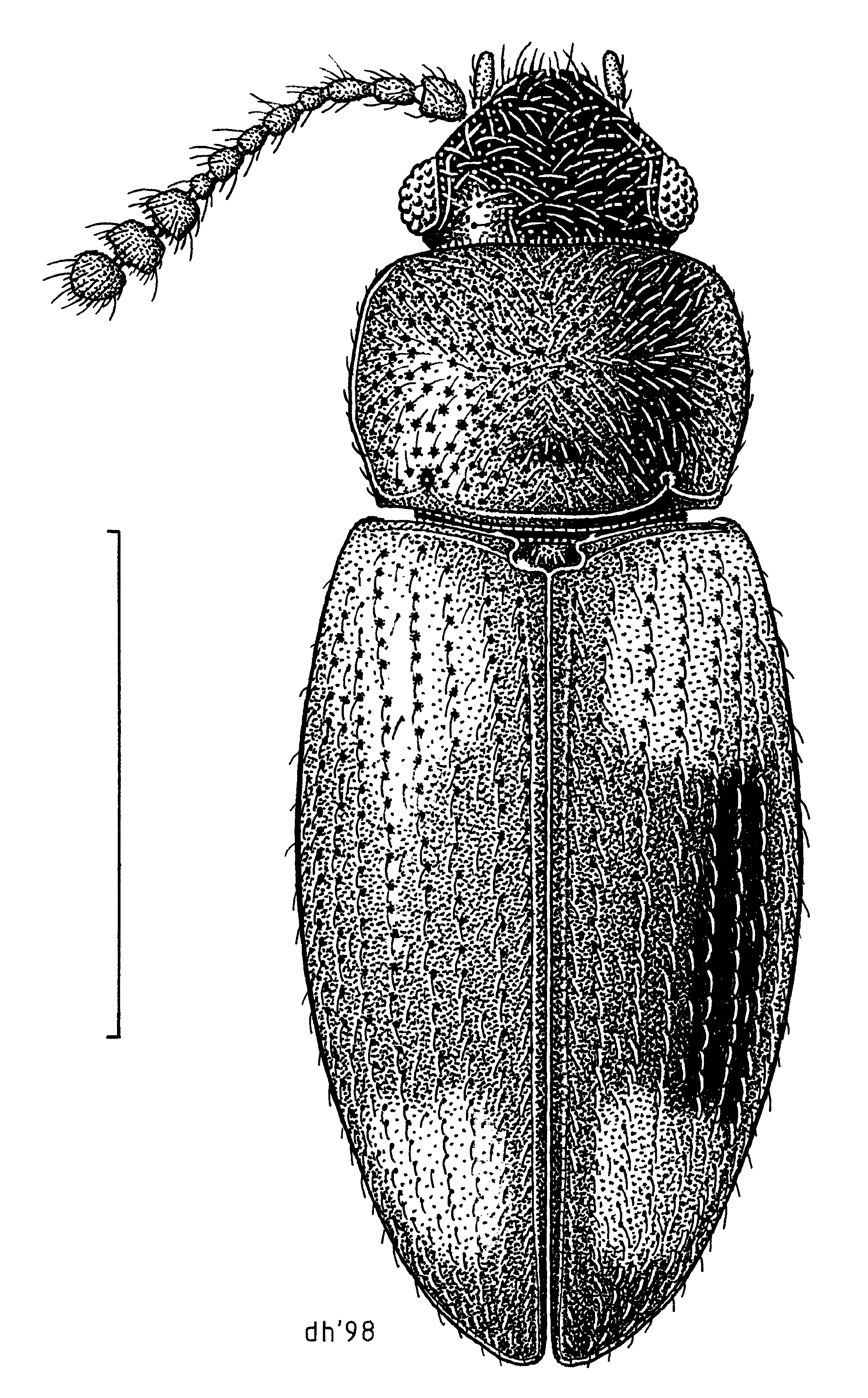
Body illustration of Loberus nitens adult

- Loberus aeratus Bruce, 1953
- Loberus anthracinus (Broun, 1893)
- Loberus borealis Leschen, 2003
- Loberus breviformis (Blackburn, 1895)
- Loberus burmensis
- Loberus cordatus Grouvelle, 1903
- Loberus depressus (Sharp, 1876)
- Loberus discipennis Reitter, 1875
- Loberus diversicollis Grouvelle, 1903
- Loberus fauveli Grouvelle, 1917
- Loberus foveolatus
- Loberus humeralis Reitter
- Loberus imbellis Casey, 1900
- Loberus impressus LeConte, 1863
- Loberus insularis Casey
- Loberus koebelei (Blackburn, 1895)
- Loberus javanensis Bruce, 1954
- Loberus marginicollis (Grouvelle, 1913)
- Loberus nitens (Sharp, 1876)
- Loberus obscurus Montrouzier, 1864
- Loberus ornatus Schaeffer, 1904
- Loberus pictus Montrouzier, 1861
- Loberus puberulus Casey
- Loberus sharpi (Blackburn, 1895)
- Loberus stygius (Blackburn, 1895)
- Loberus subchalceus Grouvelle, 1903
- Loberus subglaber Casey, 1900
- Loberus sublautus (Blackburn, 1903)
- Loberus testaceipennis Grouvelle, 1916
- Loberus testaceus Reitter, 1875
- Loberus tropicus Kirsch, 1873
- Loberus velox Grouvelle, 1919
- Loberus vitraci Grouvelle, 1902
- Loberus watti Leschen, 2003
