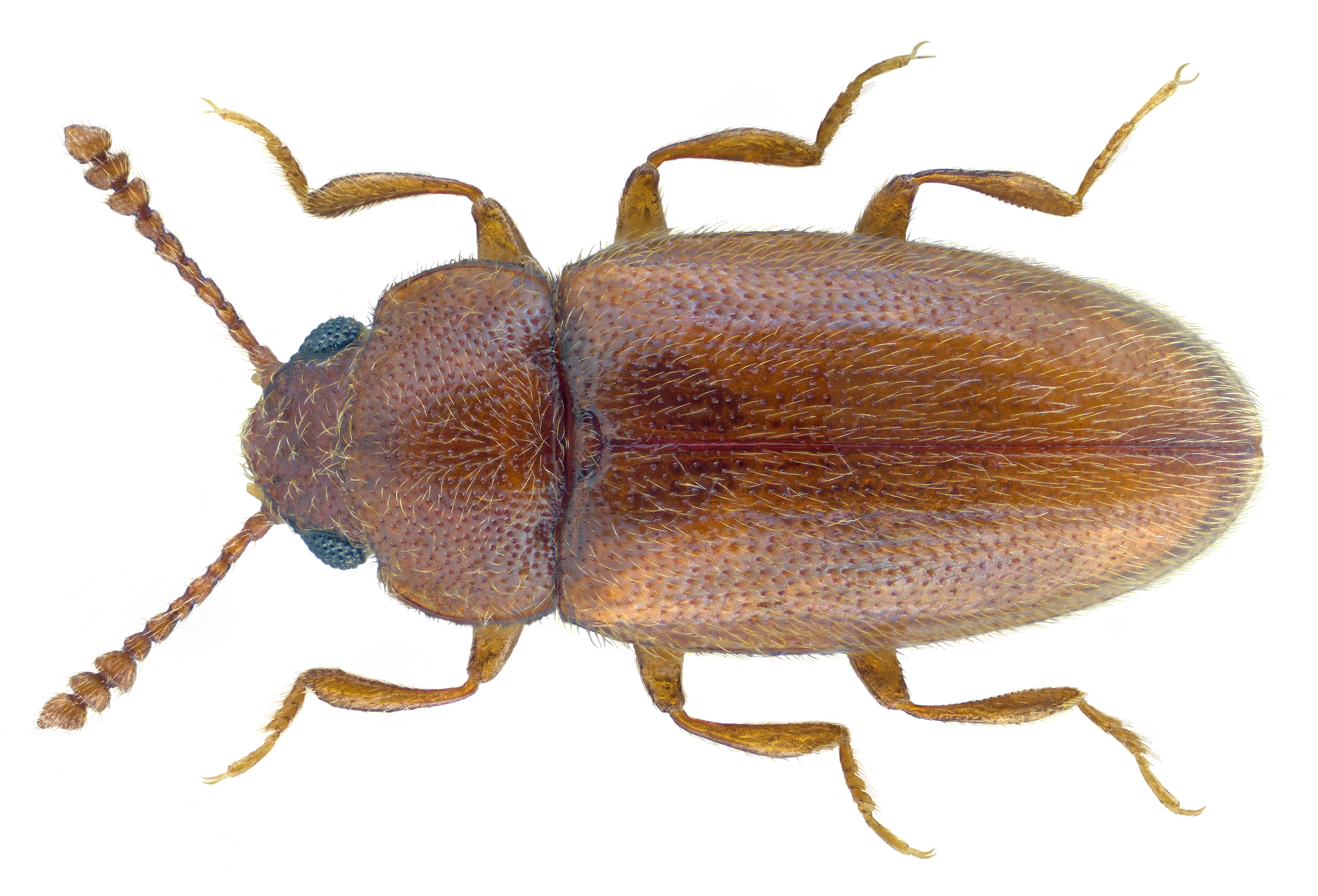
- Cryptophilus integer
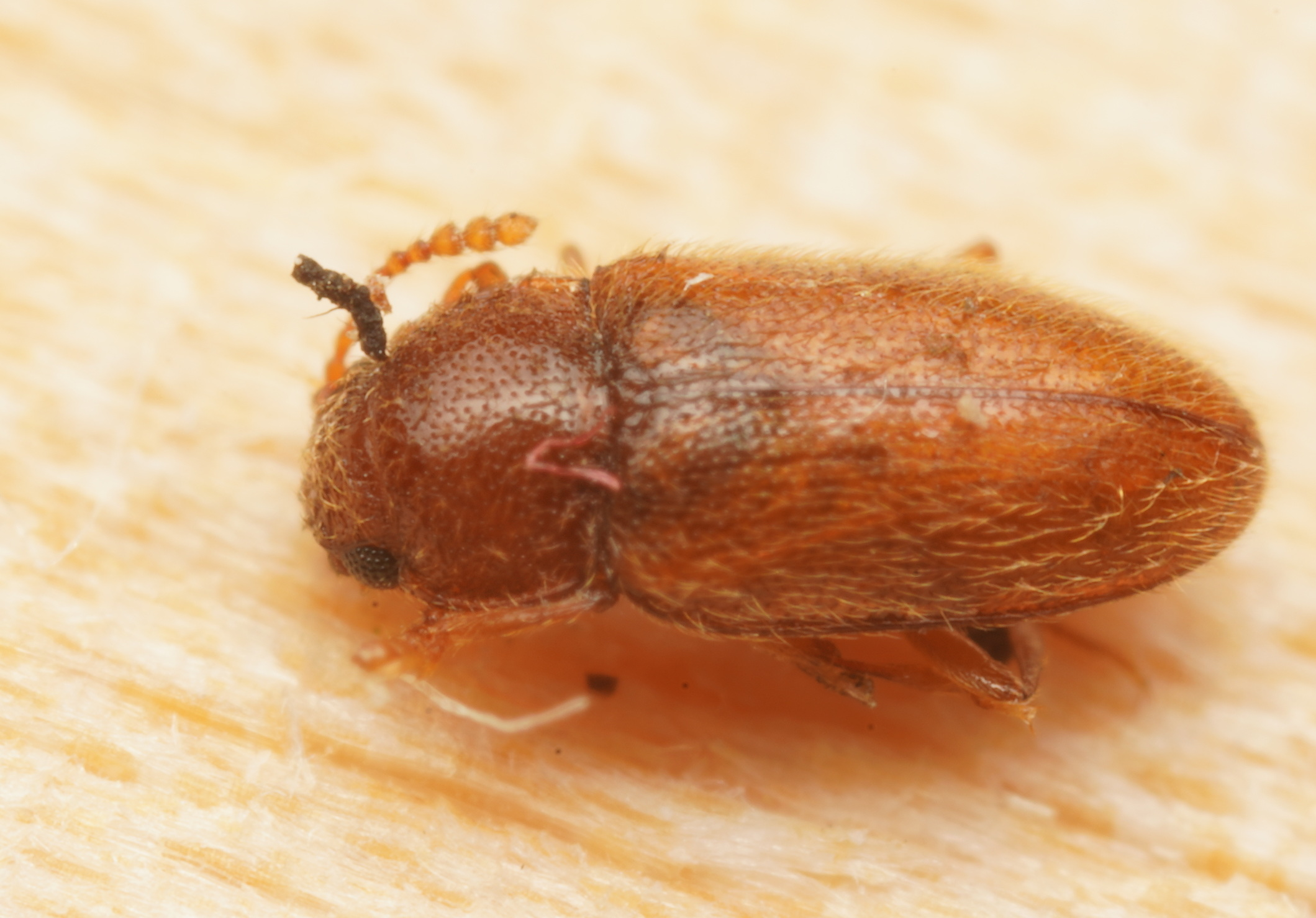
- Cryptophilus propinquus

Scientific classification
- Kingdom: Animalia
- Phylum: Arthropoda
- Clade: Pancrustacea
- Class: Insecta
- Order: Coleoptera
- Suborder: Polyphaga
- Infraorder: Cucujiformia
- Family: Erotylidae
- Subfamily: Xenoscelinae
- Genus: Cryptophilus; Reitter, 1874

Type species
- Cryptophilus obliteratus Reitter, 1874

Synonyms
- Gryptophilus (lapsus)

= Cryptophilus =

Genus of beetles

Cryptophilus is a genus of tiny pleasing fungus beetles (family Erotylidae) which is found in much of the world except the polar regions. Some authors place this genus in tribe Cryptophilini of subfamily Cryptophilinae, others accept fewer subfamilies in the Erotylidae and place the Cryptophilini in subfamily Xenoscelinae. Earlier authors usually allied Cryptophilus with the lizard beetles, at that time held to be a distinct family Languriidae but actually paraphyletic with Erotylidae and eventually merged into it.

The genus Toramus is sometimes included here, but Atomarops may be an even closer relative.

== Description ==
Cryptophilus adults are brown and slightly hairy beetles, around 2 mm long, and with 3-segmented antennal "clubs". They resemble beetles of the unrelated family Cryptophagidae, which has led to considerable nomenclatorial confusion (see below). Unlike cryptophagids, Cryptophilus have sockets for the foreleg coxae that are mostly closed.

Adults: Head and body
The body shape of these beetles is more or less flattened and resembles Toramus. Unlike in that genus, on the head the suture across the "throat" is more shallow and straight and does not extend to the head sides, while the rear neck has file-like structures for producing squeaking sounds at least in male Cryptophilus. The prothorax is wider than long and has a keel, which, unlike in Toramus, has evenly distributed notches along the edges. Also different from that genus are the cavities where the foreleg coxae attach, which are mostly closed but open at the back (instead of entirely closed), and the rear margin of the prosternal process which has a slight notch (instead of a deeper and distinct notch, or no notch at all). On the mesosternum, the rests for the foreleg coxae are well-developed, not reduced to a V-shaped ridge as in Toramus. The mesosternum also has a parallel-sided process, but lacks a line formed by a distinct row of punctures. The joint between meso- and metasternum has an internal double knob, as is typical for Cryptophilini (but also for some related lineages, such as Languriinae). On the metasternum, there are no subcoxal lines, and its endosternite lacks muscle attachment plates projecting inside the body cavity. On the abdomen, there are no scattered glandular pores.

Adults: Wings and legs
The elytra have irregularly scattered punctuations and bear hairs which curl downwards. On the parchment-like hindwings, the radial cell is present, and wing vein CuA2+3+4+AA1+2 does not contact the submedial dot. The foreleg tibiae have a smooth and unornamented outer margin, unlike in Toramus where the margin is spiny.

Larvae
Cryptophilus larvae are long, hairy and have grains or knobs on the back. They can be mistaken for larvae of the Monotomidae genus Monotoma or the Nitidulidae (sap beetle) genus Epuraea (both Cucujoidea, like the Erotylidae), which occur in similar habitats. Cryptophilus larvae can be recognised by their mandibles, which lack a sub-apical accessory tooth and have a large, subtriangular prostheca.

== Ecology ==
Adults and larvae are mycophages that feed on mould. Cryptophilus occur in decaying plant matter (e.g. leaf litter, wood debris, compost heaps, grass cuttings, straw) and also in stored food products (e.g. cereals, beans, flour, dried fruit, nuts).

== Systematics and nomenclature ==
When Edmund Reitter established the genus Cryptophilus in 1874, he did not specify a type species. This was corrected only in 1969, when Michio Chûjô designated the beetle described as Cryptophagus integer by Oswald Heer in 1841 as type species of Cryptophilus. The species had been moved to Cryptophilus by Reitter and was considered a representative member of cryptophiline beetles by subsequent authors. However, towards the end of the 20th century, experts in Europe came to understand that the presumed "C.integer" was actually a cryptic species complex. While beetle researcher Jens Esser studied this, he found that Heer had been correct all along – the type specimen used to establish his species Cryptophagus integer was indeed a Cryptophagidae beetle, not an erotyline, namely a species had been described by Gustaf von Paykull in 1798 as Dermestes abietis and named today Micrambe abietis. The genus Micrambe was split from Cryptophagus in 1863 – at the time Heer described his "new" species, Cryptophagus was the correct genus name, and Paykull's species was indeed known as Cryptophagus abietis. Reitter had not seen Heer's type specimen when establishing Cryptophilus, and had misinterpreted an ambiguous passage in Heer's description to mean that Heer's species lacked a trait authors in Reitter's day used to distinguish erotylids from cryptophagids.

As for the erotylid beetles named "Cryptophilus integer" by researchers for more than a century, Esser determined that they were two species. One was C.propinquus, also known as C.fluminalis. The other, Esser at first identified as C.simplex, established as Paramecosoma simplex by Thomas Wollaston in 1857. However, he soon discovered a still older description of the "other C.integer": Typhaea angusta by Wilhelm Rosenhauer in 1856, now C.angustus. Reitter's comparison of the beetles he called "C.integer" with C.obliteratus suggest that his "C.integer" specimens were more likely than not C.angustus. In 2019, the nomenclatural problem of the type species of Cryptophilus being a Micrambe was resolved when Esser, Matthew Gimmel and Richard Leschen re-fixed the type to C.obliteratus, which was unaffected by the entire "C.integer" confusion.

=== Species ===
About 10 species were named in the genus Cryptophilus as of 2020:

- Cryptophilus angustus (Rosenhauer, 1856) (= C.balearicus, C.barnevillei, C.ceylonicus, C.debilis, C.frater, C.integer (auct. nec Heer 1841, in part), C.muticus, C.simplex)
- Cryptophilus cryptophagoides Grouvelle, 1916
- Cryptophilus hiranoi Sasaji, 1984
- Cryptophilus kurbatovi Lyubarsky, 2010
- Cryptophilus minimus Grouvelle, 1914
- Cryptophilus mirus Grouvelle, 1914
- Cryptophilus obliteratus Reitter, 1874 (= C.seriatus)
- Cryptophilus propinquus Reitter, 1874 (= C.fluminalis, C.integer (auct. nec Heer 1841, in part), C.propinguus (lapsus))
- Cryptophilus quadrisignatus Motschulsky, 1860

The Barcode of Life Data System Cytochrome c oxidase subunit I sequence data suggest the existence of at least two further (sub)species, undescribed as of 2025:

- Cryptophilus sp. "SAEVG Morph0281" (COI-5P sequence, Costa Rica, India, Western Australia)
- Cryptophilus sp. "TJH-2004" (COI-3P sequence, unknown locality)

Fossil remains found in Baltic amber were assigned to this genus.
