= Epuraea flavomaculata =

Scientific classification
- Domain: Eukaryota
- Kingdom: Animalia
- Phylum: Arthropoda
- Class: Insecta
- Order: Coleoptera
- Suborder: Polyphaga
- Infraorder: Cucujiformia
- Family: Nitidulidae
- Genus: Epuraea
- Species: E. flavomaculata

Binomial name
- Epuraea flavomaculata Mäklin, 1853

Species of beetle

Epuraea flavomaculata is a species of sap-feeding beetle in the family Nitidulidae. It is found in North America.
