= Epuraea planulata =

Scientific classification
- Kingdom: Animalia
- Phylum: Arthropoda
- Class: Insecta
- Order: Coleoptera
- Suborder: Polyphaga
- Infraorder: Cucujiformia
- Family: Nitidulidae
- Genus: Epuraea
- Species: E. planulata

Binomial name
- Epuraea planulata Erichson, 1843

Synonyms
- Epuraea placida Mäklin, 1853

Species of beetle

Epuraea planulata is a species of sap-feeding beetle in the family Nitidulidae. It is found in North America.
