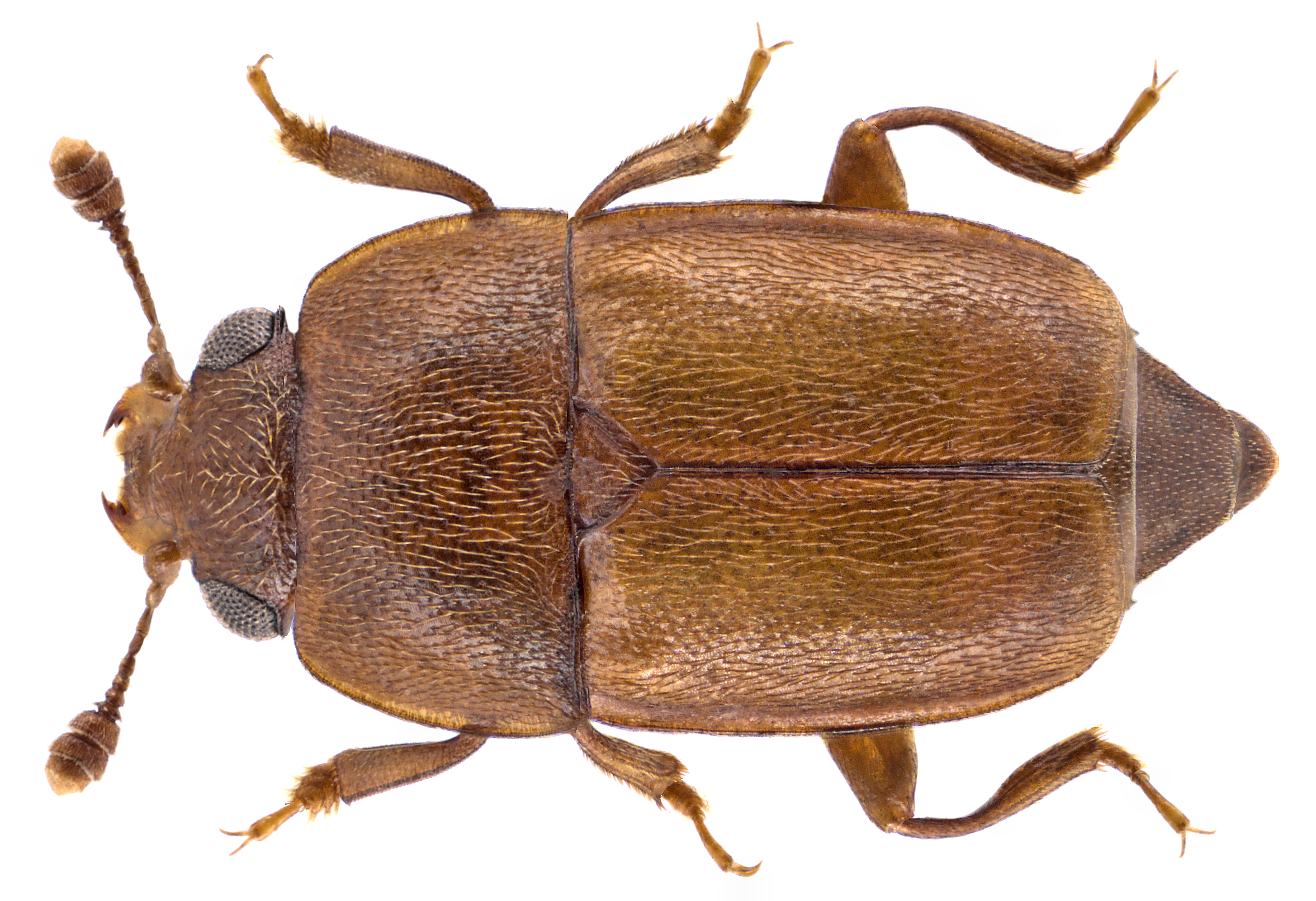

Scientific classification
- Kingdom: Animalia
- Phylum: Arthropoda
- Class: Insecta
- Order: Coleoptera
- Suborder: Polyphaga
- Infraorder: Cucujiformia
- Family: Nitidulidae
- Genus: Epuraea
- Species: E. luteola

Binomial name
- Epuraea luteola Erichson, 1843

Synonyms
- Haptoncus floreolus Sharp, 1890; Haptoncus intendens (Walker, 1858); Haptoncus pauperculus Reitter, 1873; Haptoncus pubescens Murray, 1864; Haptoncus subquadratus Reitter, 1877; Haptoncus texana (Crotch, 1874)

= Epuraea luteola =

Species of beetle

Epuraea luteola, the pineapple sap beetle, is a species of sap-feeding beetle in the family Nitidulidae. It is found in North America, Oceania, and Europe.
