= Epuraea obtusicollis =

Scientific classification
- Kingdom: Animalia
- Phylum: Arthropoda
- Class: Insecta
- Order: Coleoptera
- Suborder: Polyphaga
- Infraorder: Cucujiformia
- Family: Nitidulidae
- Genus: Epuraea
- Species: E. obtusicollis

Binomial name
- Epuraea obtusicollis Reitter, 1873

Synonyms
- Epuraea ovata Horn, 1879

Species of beetle

Epuraea obtusicollis is a species of sap-feeding beetle in the family Nitidulidae. It is found in North America.
