= Loberus ornatus =

Scientific classification
- Kingdom: Animalia
- Phylum: Arthropoda
- Class: Insecta
- Order: Coleoptera
- Suborder: Polyphaga
- Infraorder: Cucujiformia
- Family: Erotylidae
- Genus: Loberus
- Species: L. ornatus

Binomial name
- Loberus ornatus Schaeffer, 1904

Species of beetle

Loberus ornatus is a species of pleasing fungus beetle in the family Erotylidae. It is found in North America.
