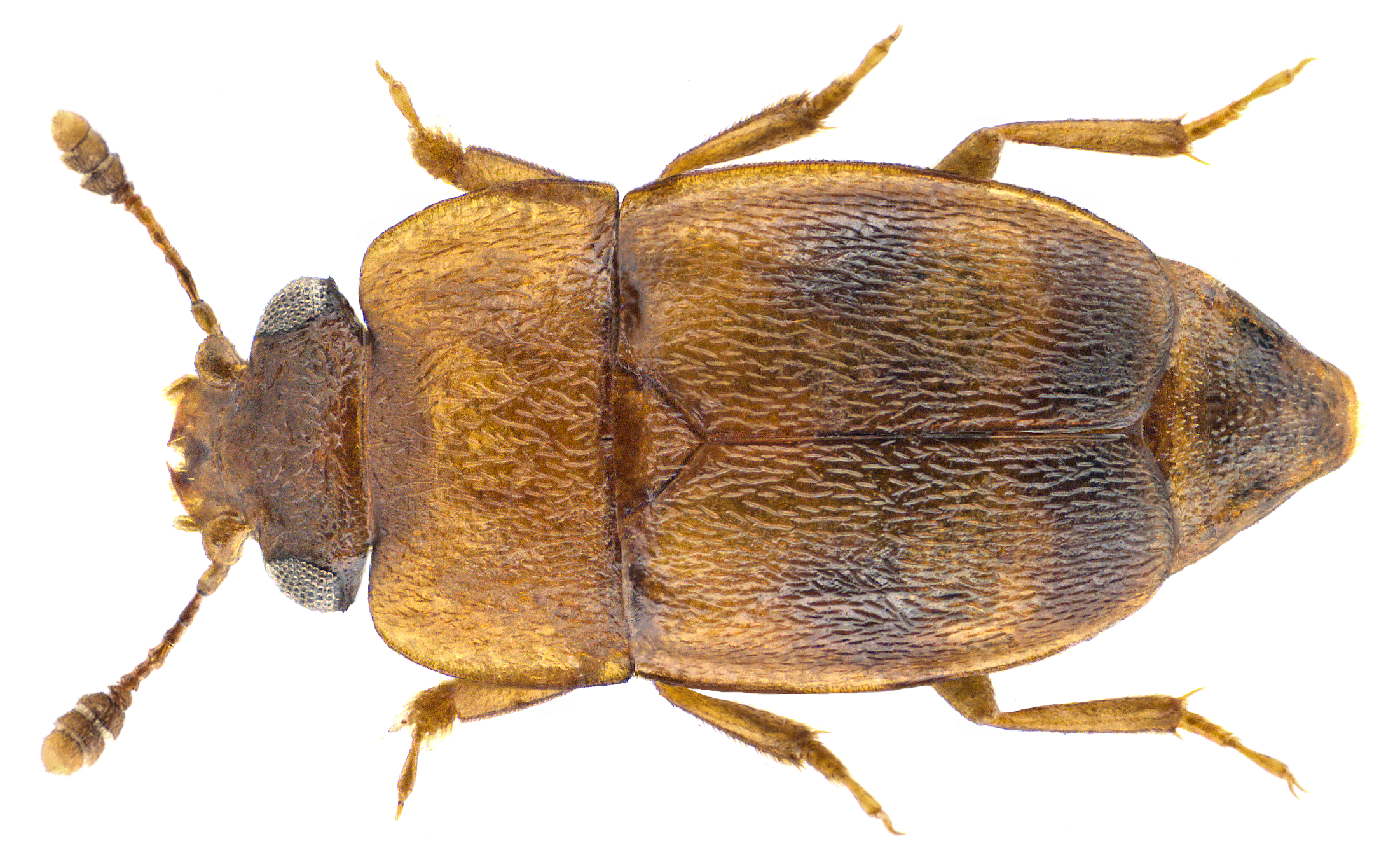

Scientific classification
- Kingdom: Animalia
- Phylum: Arthropoda
- Class: Insecta
- Order: Coleoptera
- Suborder: Polyphaga
- Infraorder: Cucujiformia
- Family: Nitidulidae
- Genus: Epuraea
- Species: E. ocularis

Binomial name
- Epuraea ocularis Fairmaire, 1849

Synonyms
- Epuraea tetragona (Murray, 1864); Haptoncus tetragonus Murray, 1864

= Epuraea ocularis =

Species of beetle

Epuraea ocularis is a species of sap-feeding beetle in the family Nitidulidae. It is found in Africa, Europe and Northern Asia (excluding China), North America, Oceania, and Southern Asia.
