= Epuraea avara =

Scientific classification
- Domain: Eukaryota
- Kingdom: Animalia
- Phylum: Arthropoda
- Class: Insecta
- Order: Coleoptera
- Suborder: Polyphaga
- Infraorder: Cucujiformia
- Family: Nitidulidae
- Genus: Epuraea
- Species: E. avara

Binomial name
- Epuraea avara (Randall, 1838)

Synonyms
- Epuraea nubila LeConte, 1857

Species of beetle

Epuraea avara is a species of sap-feeding beetle in the family Nitidulidae. It is found in North America.
