= Epuraea populi =

Scientific classification
- Domain: Eukaryota
- Kingdom: Animalia
- Phylum: Arthropoda
- Class: Insecta
- Order: Coleoptera
- Suborder: Polyphaga
- Infraorder: Cucujiformia
- Family: Nitidulidae
- Genus: Epuraea
- Species: E. populi

Binomial name
- Epuraea populi Dodge, 1939

Species of beetle

Epuraea populi is a species of sap-feeding beetle in the family Nitidulidae. It is found in North America.
