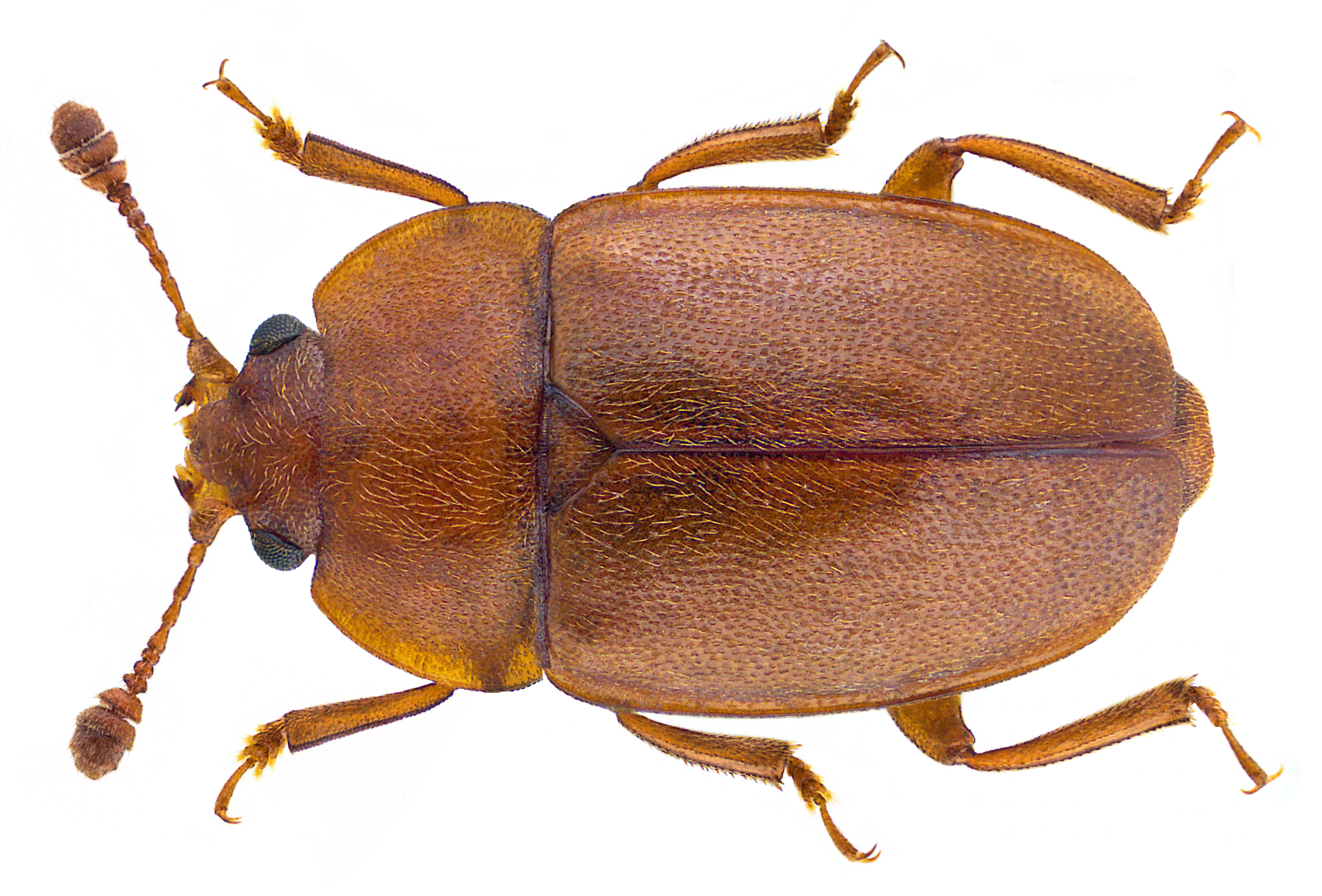

Scientific classification
- Kingdom: Animalia
- Phylum: Arthropoda
- Class: Insecta
- Order: Coleoptera
- Suborder: Polyphaga
- Infraorder: Cucujiformia
- Family: Nitidulidae
- Genus: Epuraea
- Species: E. aestiva

Binomial name
- Epuraea aestiva (Linnaeus, 1758)

= Epuraea aestiva =

Species of beetle

Epuraea aestiva is a species of sap-feeding beetle in the family Nitidulidae. It is found in Europe and Northern Asia (excluding China) and North America.
