= Toramus chamaeropis =

Scientific classification
- Domain: Eukaryota
- Kingdom: Animalia
- Phylum: Arthropoda
- Class: Insecta
- Order: Coleoptera
- Suborder: Polyphaga
- Infraorder: Cucujiformia
- Family: Erotylidae
- Genus: Toramus
- Species: T. chamaeropis

Binomial name
- Toramus chamaeropis (Schaeffer, 1904)

Species of beetle

Toramus chamaeropis is a species of pleasing fungus beetle in the family Erotylidae. It is found in North America.
