= Hapalips texanus =

Scientific classification
- Kingdom: Animalia
- Phylum: Arthropoda
- Clade: Pancrustacea
- Class: Insecta
- Order: Coleoptera
- Suborder: Polyphaga
- Infraorder: Cucujiformia
- Family: Erotylidae
- Genus: Hapalips
- Species: H. texanus

Binomial name
- Hapalips texanus Schaeffer, 1910

Species of beetle

Hapalips texanus is a species of pleasing fungus beetle in the family Erotylidae. It is found in North America. They are elongate and have a shining upper surface.
