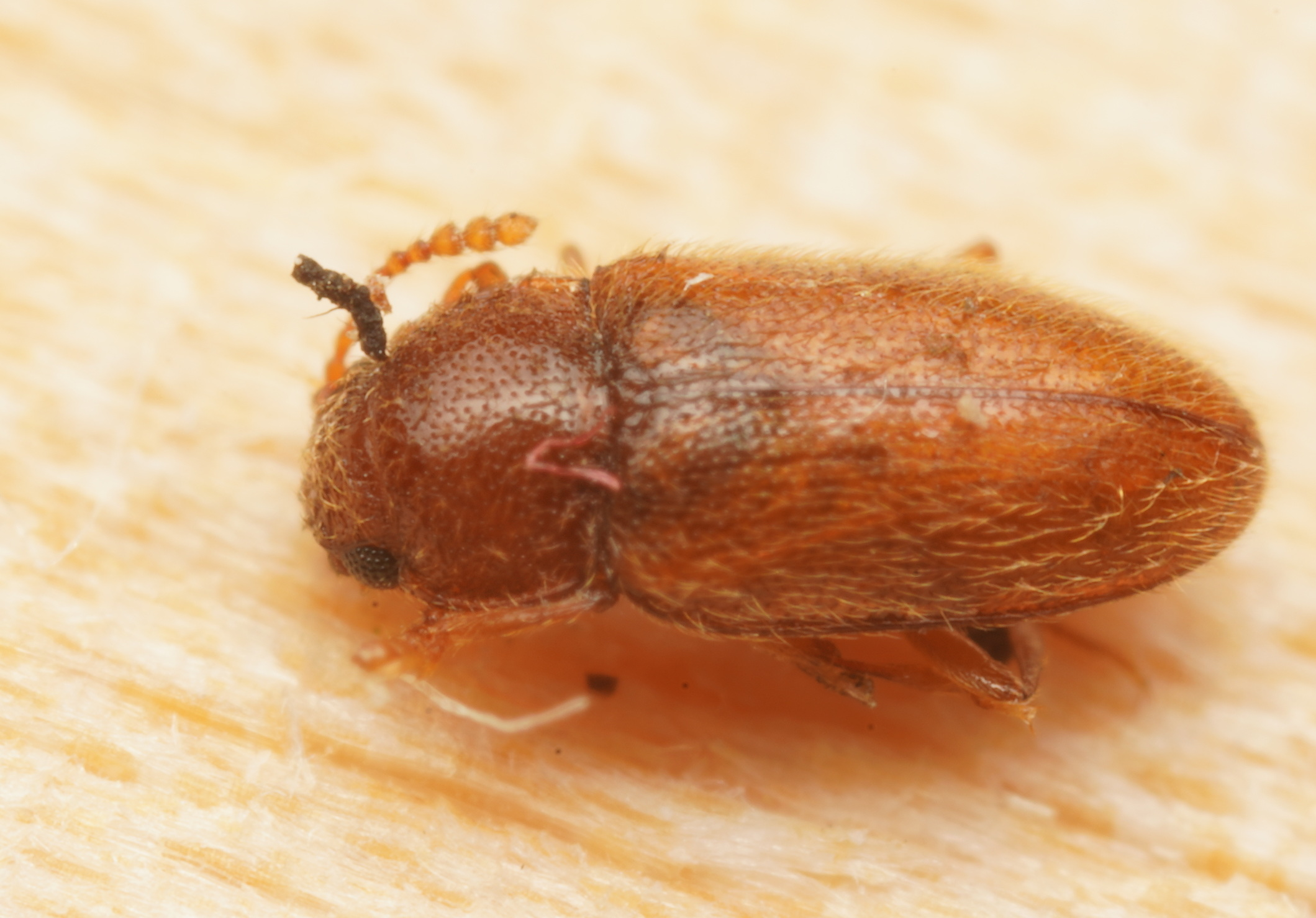

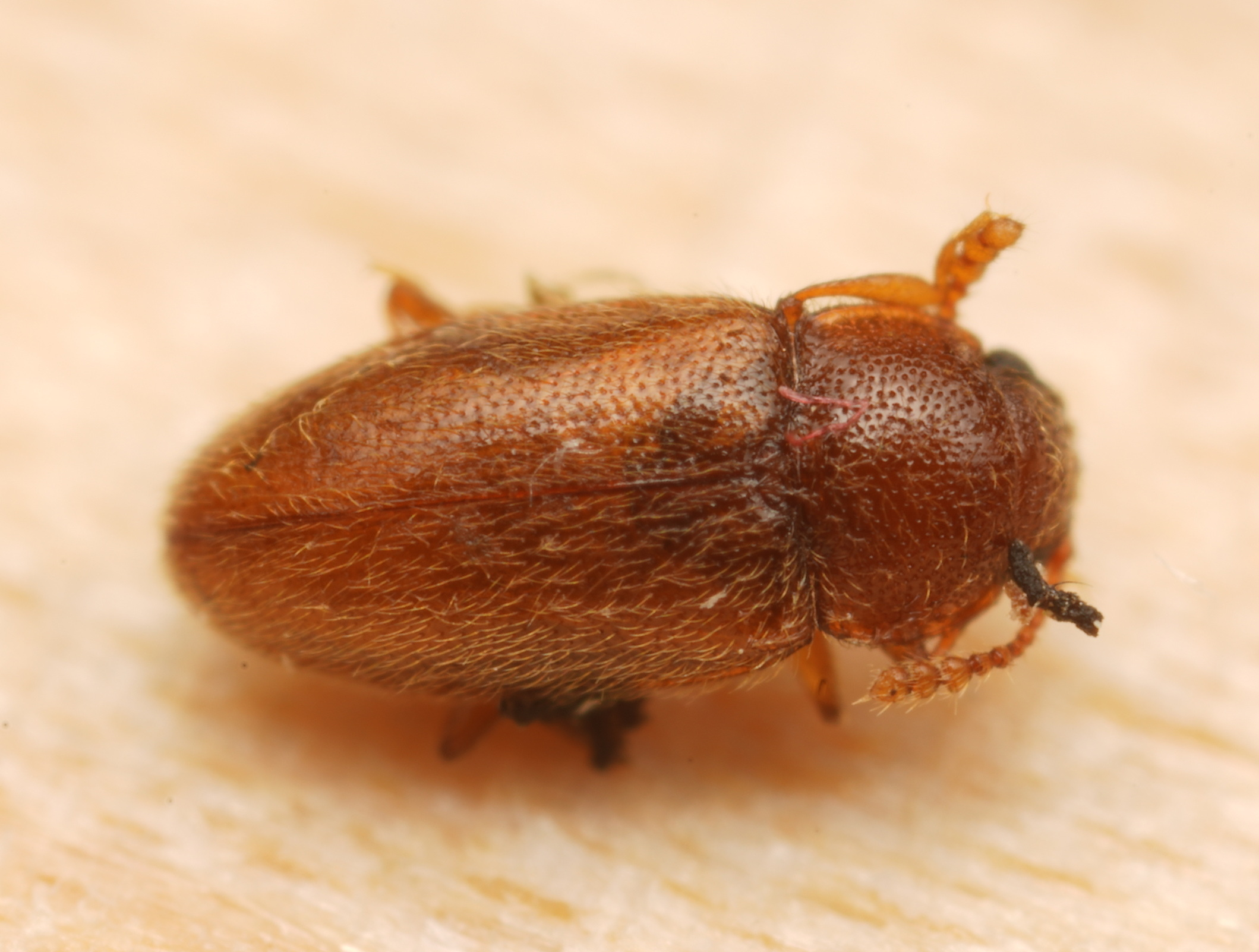

Scientific classification
- Kingdom: Animalia
- Phylum: Arthropoda
- Clade: Pancrustacea
- Class: Insecta
- Order: Coleoptera
- Suborder: Polyphaga
- Infraorder: Cucujiformia
- Family: Erotylidae
- Genus: Cryptophilus
- Species: C. propinquus

Binomial name
- Cryptophilus propinquus Reitter, 1874

= Cryptophilus propinquus =

Species of beetle

Cryptophilus propinquus is a species of pleasing fungus beetles that belongs to the subfamily Cryptophilinae. This species can be found in the Nearctic realm and Eurasia.
