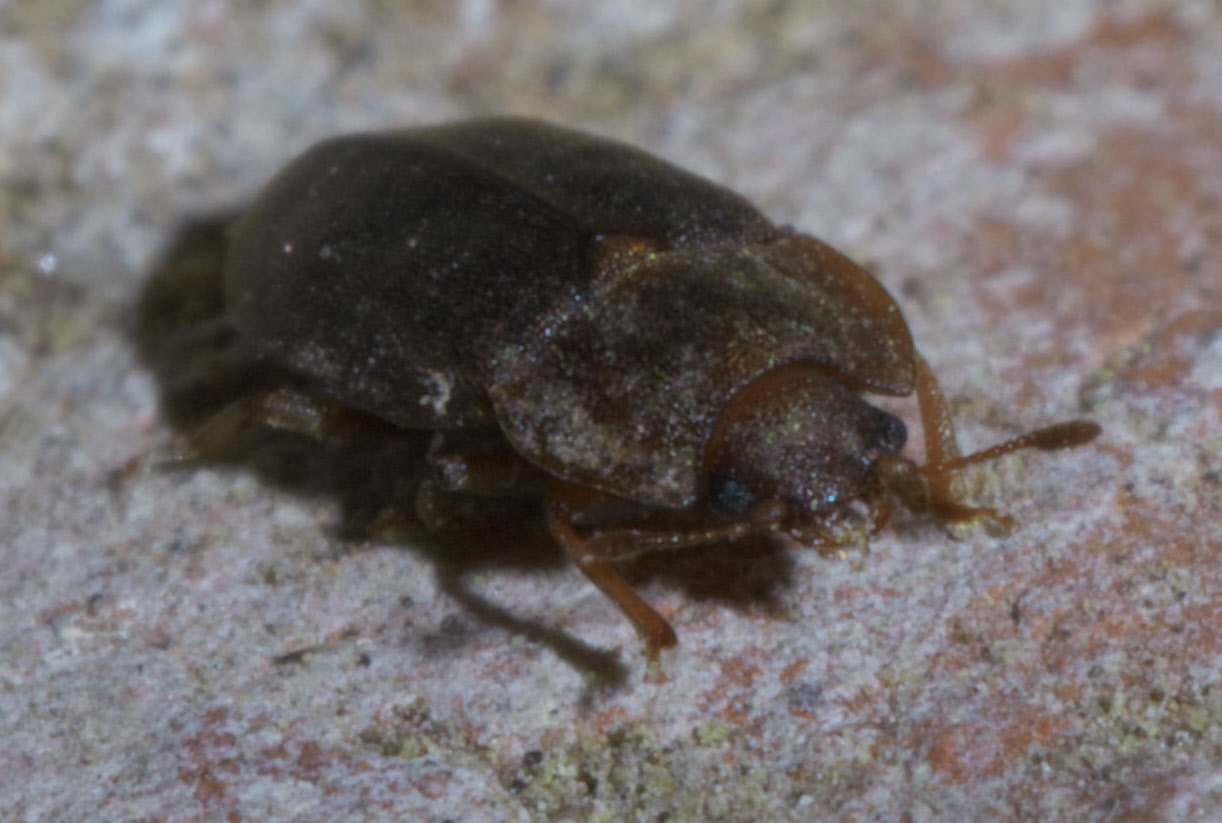

Scientific classification
- Domain: Eukaryota
- Kingdom: Animalia
- Phylum: Arthropoda
- Class: Insecta
- Order: Coleoptera
- Suborder: Polyphaga
- Infraorder: Cucujiformia
- Family: Nitidulidae
- Genus: Epuraea
- Species: E. rufa

Binomial name
- Epuraea rufa (Say, 1825)

Synonyms
- Epuraea badia (Melsheimer, 1846); Epuraea rotundicollis Reitter, 1873

= Epuraea rufa =

Species of beetle

Epuraea rufa is a species of sap-feeding beetle in the family Nitidulidae. It is found in North America.

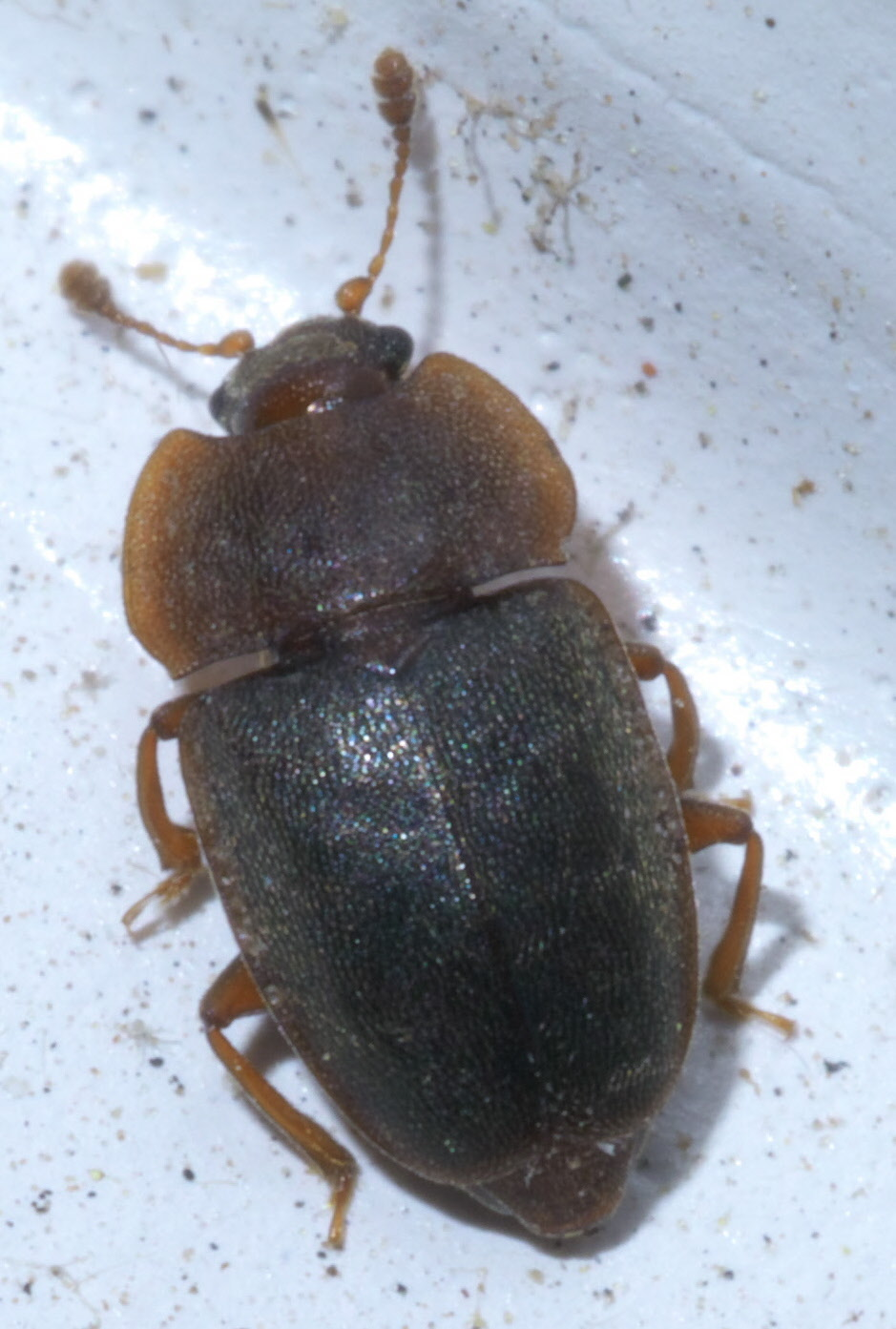
