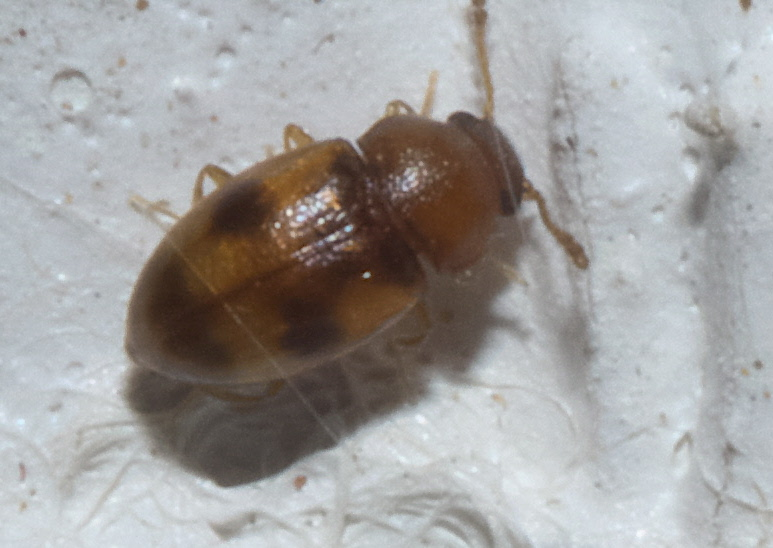

Scientific classification
- Kingdom: Animalia
- Phylum: Arthropoda
- Clade: Pancrustacea
- Class: Insecta
- Order: Coleoptera
- Suborder: Polyphaga
- Infraorder: Cucujiformia
- Family: Erotylidae
- Genus: Toramus
- Species: T. pulchellus

Binomial name
- Toramus pulchellus (LeConte, 1863)

= Toramus pulchellus =

Species of beetle

Toramus pulchellus is a species of pleasing fungus beetle in the family Erotylidae. Yellow-brown to dark colored, it is only 1.3mm to 1.6mm long. It is found in North America.

This beetle eats mainly zygote fungi, which pleasing fungus beetles of other genera generally avoid.
