= Epuraea truncatella =

Scientific classification
- Domain: Eukaryota
- Kingdom: Animalia
- Phylum: Arthropoda
- Class: Insecta
- Order: Coleoptera
- Suborder: Polyphaga
- Infraorder: Cucujiformia
- Family: Nitidulidae
- Genus: Epuraea
- Species: E. truncatella

Binomial name
- Epuraea truncatella Mannerheim, 1846

Synonyms
- Epuraea nigra Mäklin, 1853; Epuraea ornatula Notman, 1919

Species of beetle

Epuraea truncatella is a species of sap-feeding beetle in the family Nitidulidae. It is found in North America.
