= Epuraea peltoides =

Scientific classification
- Domain: Eukaryota
- Kingdom: Animalia
- Phylum: Arthropoda
- Class: Insecta
- Order: Coleoptera
- Suborder: Polyphaga
- Infraorder: Cucujiformia
- Family: Nitidulidae
- Genus: Epuraea
- Species: E. peltoides

Binomial name
- Epuraea peltoides Horn, 1879

Species of beetle

Epuraea peltoides is a species of sap-feeding beetle in the family Nitidulidae. It is found in North America.
