= Epuraea linearis =

Scientific classification
- Domain: Eukaryota
- Kingdom: Animalia
- Phylum: Arthropoda
- Class: Insecta
- Order: Coleoptera
- Suborder: Polyphaga
- Infraorder: Cucujiformia
- Family: Nitidulidae
- Genus: Epuraea
- Species: E. linearis

Binomial name
- Epuraea linearis Mäklin, 1853

Species of beetle

Epuraea linearis is a species of sap-feeding beetle in the family Nitidulidae, that may vary from sizes 2.7-3.0 mm. It is found in North America. Its habitat may be on pine and spruce, and are usually seen from the season of May until September of the year.

== Range ==
Holarctic boreal/montane; in NA, Quebec (QC)-Northwest Territories (NT)-Alaska (AK) to New Hampshire (NH)-Wisconsin (WI)-Colorado (CO)-New Mexico (NM)- Arizona (AZ)-Oregon (OR).
