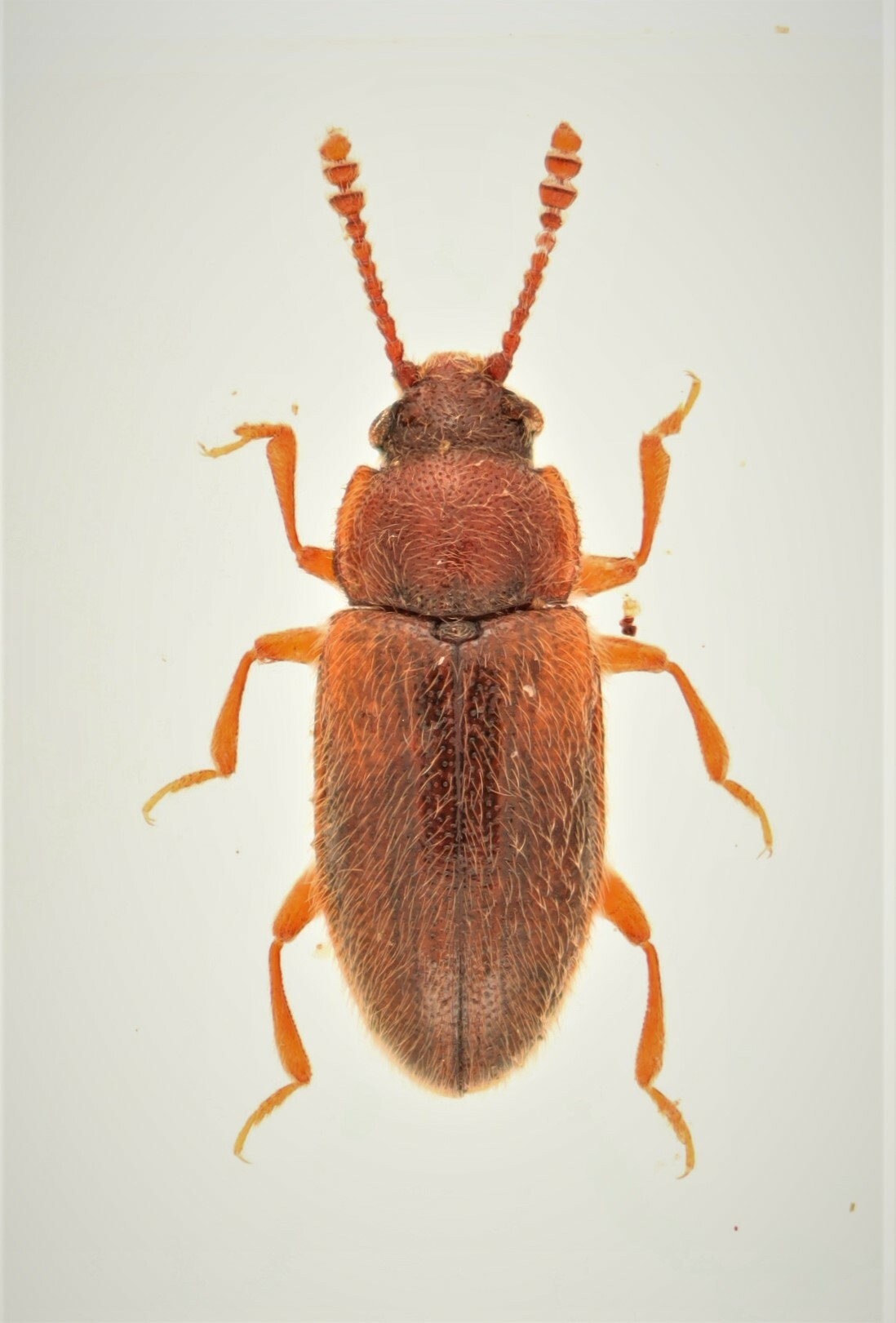

Scientific classification
- Kingdom: Animalia
- Phylum: Arthropoda
- Clade: Pancrustacea
- Class: Insecta
- Order: Coleoptera
- Suborder: Polyphaga
- Infraorder: Cucujiformia
- Family: Erotylidae
- Genus: Cryptophilus
- Species: C. obliteratus

Binomial name
- Cryptophilus obliteratus Reitter, 1874

Synonyms
- Cryptophilus seriatus Casey, 1924

= Cryptophilus obliteratus =

Species of beetle

Cryptophilus obliteratus, nowadays also including C.seriatus, is a species of pleasing fungus beetle in the family Erotylidae. It is found in North America.
