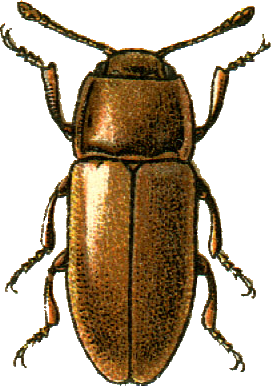

Scientific classification
- Domain: Eukaryota
- Kingdom: Animalia
- Phylum: Arthropoda
- Class: Insecta
- Order: Coleoptera
- Suborder: Polyphaga
- Infraorder: Cucujiformia
- Family: Erotylidae
- Genus: Cryptophilus
- Species: C. integer

Binomial name
- Cryptophilus integer (Heer, 1841)

= Cryptophilus integer =

Species of beetle

Cryptophilus integer is a species of pleasing fungus beetle in the family Erotylidae. It is found in Australia, Europe and Northern Asia (excluding China), North America, and Oceania.
