= Epuraea terminalis =

Scientific classification
- Domain: Eukaryota
- Kingdom: Animalia
- Phylum: Arthropoda
- Class: Insecta
- Order: Coleoptera
- Suborder: Polyphaga
- Infraorder: Cucujiformia
- Family: Nitidulidae
- Genus: Epuraea
- Species: E. terminalis

Binomial name
- Epuraea terminalis Mannerheim, 1843

Synonyms
- Epuraea immunda Sturm, 1844; Epuraea infuscata Mäklin, 1853

Species of beetle

Epuraea terminalis is a species of sap-feeding beetles in the family Nitidulidae. It is found in Europe and Northern Asia (excluding China) and North America.
