= Missing Link =

Missing link may refer to:

== Biology ==
- "Missing link", a non-scientific term typically referring to transitional fossils
  - Missing link (human evolution) transitional fossils in human evolution
    - Piltdown Man, a hoax in which bone fragments were presented as the "missing link" between ape and man

== Geography ==
- Missing Link, an unmapped system of underground partial-flooded caves that connects Mossdale Caverns in the Yorkshire Dales to the Black Keld

== Art, entertainment, and media ==
=== Films ===
- The Missing Links (film), a 1916 American silent crime film directed by Lloyd Ingraham
- The Missing Link (1927 film), an American silent comedy film directed by Charles Reisner
- The Missing Link (1980 film), a Franco-Belgian animated film directed by Picha
- Missing Link (1988 film), a film directed by Carol and David Hughes
- Missing Link (2019 film), a stop-motion animation film directed by Chris Butler

=== Games ===
- Missing Link (puzzle), a 1981 mechanical puzzle
- Deus Ex: Human Revolution – The Missing Link, downloadable content for the 2011 video game Deus Ex: Human Revolution
- Missing Links (stylized as M-ss-ng L-nks), an educational language computer game for the Apple II, written in 1984

=== Literature ===
- Missing Link (comics), name of four fictional characters in Marvel Comics
- Missing Links, a book by Rick Reilly
- The Missing Link, a novel in the Fourth World trilogy by Kate Thompson

=== Music ===
- The Missing Links (band), an Australian rock band active from 1964 to 1966
- Missing Link Records, an Australian-based independent record label

==== Albums ====
- The Missing Link (Fred Anderson album), a 1984 album by American jazz saxophonist Fred Anderson
- Missing Links (album), Missing Links Volume Two, or Missing Links Volume Three, a series of compilation albums by The Monkees, released 1987–1996
- The Missing Link (Rage album), a 1993 album by heavy metal band Rage
- The Missing Link (Jeremy Enigk album), a 2007 album by Jeremy Enigk
- The Missing Links (album), a 2012 album by Pennsylvania hardcore punk band Wisdom In Chains
- Missing Link (EP), a 2017 extended play (EP) by Australian musician Nick Murphy

==== Songs ====
- "Missing Link", a 1993 song by Del the Funky Homosapien and Dinosaur Jr. from the Judgment Night film soundtrack
- "Missing Link", a 2001 Machinae Supremacy song
- "Missing Link", a song by The Hives from the 2004 album Tyrannosaurus Hives
- "Missing Links", a song by Plan B from the 2006 album Who Needs Actions When You Got Words

=== Television ===
- Missing Link (TV series), a sports program on ESPN Classic hosted by Colin Cowherd
- Missing Links (game show), a game show hosted by Ed McMahon and Dick Clark
- "A Missing Link", an episode of Alias
- "Missing Link", an episode of Code Lyoko
- "Missing Link" (Space: 1999), an episode of Space: 1999
- "The Missing Link", an episode of Colonel March of Scotland Yard
- "The Missing Link", an episode of The Legend of Zelda
- "The Missing Link" (Patience), a 2025 episode
- "The Missing Link", an episode of Supergirl
- "Missing Links", an episode of the sitcom The King of Queens

=== Other art, entertainment, and media ===
- Missing Link, an avantgardistic group of architects from 1970 to 1980 with Angela Hareiter, Otto Kapfinger and Adolf Krischanitz in Austria
- Missing Link, a car constructor and racing team in the TV series Future GPX Cyber Formula
- Missing Link, a character in the Monsters vs. Aliens franchise
- The Missing Link (wrestler) or Dewey Robertson (1939–2007), professional wrestler
