= Loberus impressus =

Scientific classification
- Kingdom: Animalia
- Phylum: Arthropoda
- Clade: Pancrustacea
- Class: Insecta
- Order: Coleoptera
- Suborder: Polyphaga
- Infraorder: Cucujiformia
- Family: Erotylidae
- Genus: Loberus
- Species: L. impressus

Binomial name
- Loberus impressus LeConte, 1863

Species of beetle

Loberus impressus is a species of pleasing fungus beetle in the family Erotylidae. It is found in North America.
