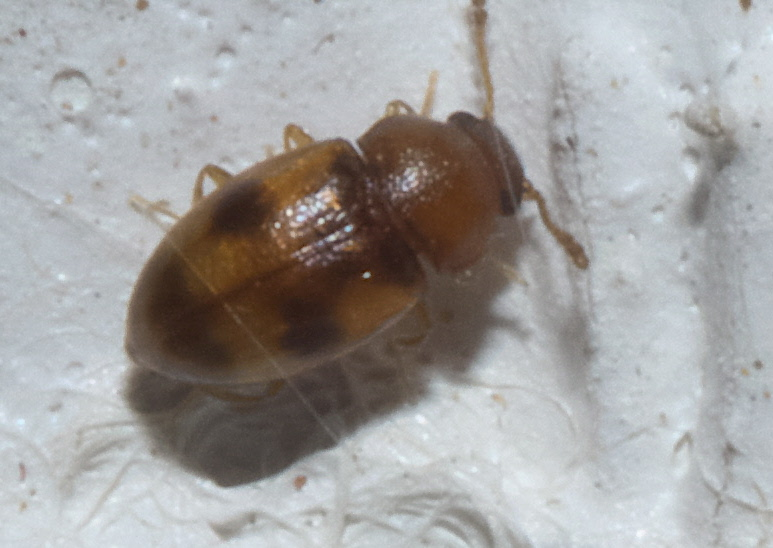
- Adult of the type species Toramus pulchellus

Scientific classification
- Kingdom: Animalia
- Phylum: Arthropoda
- Clade: Pancrustacea
- Class: Insecta
- Order: Coleoptera
- Suborder: Polyphaga
- Infraorder: Cucujiformia
- Family: Erotylidae
- Tribe: Toramini
- Genus: Toramus; Grouvelle, 1916

Type species
- Tomarus pulchellus LeConte, 1863

Synonyms
- "Eudodactylus" (nomen nudum); Itomarus Reitter, 1920; Itotomarus (lapsus); Tomarus LeConte, 1861 (non Erichson 1847: preoccupied)

= Toramus =

Genus of beetles

Toramus is a genus of pleasing fungus beetles (family Erotylidae) which is found in much of the world except the polar regions.

The present genus was originally established as Tomarus by John LeConte in 1861, but Wilhelm Erichson had used that name in 1847 already for a genus of rhinoceros beetles. In 1916, Antoine Grouvelle chose the replacement name Toramus, pre-empting Edmund Reitter whose proposed 1920 replacement name Itomarus thus immediately became a junior synonym.

== Description and ecology ==
Toramus adults are tiny brown beetles with antennae that end in "clubs". Their body shape is more or less flattened and resembles Cryptophilus.

The ecology of this genus is not well known. At least some species of Toramus (e.g. T.pulchellus) eat mainly zygote fungi, which other pleasing fungus beetles generally avoid. The gut of dissected specimens contained fungal hyphae and unspecified organic detritus.

Head and body
Unlike in Cryptophilus, on the head there is a deep suture not just across the "throat", but also extending to the sides of the head, while the neck lacks file-like structures for producing squeaking sounds. The prothorax is wider than long and has a keel, which, unlike in Cryptophilus, has straight edges. Also different from that genus are the cavities where the foreleg coxae attach, which are entirely closed (instead of mostly closed but open at the back), and the rear margin of the prosternal process which depending on species has a deep and distinct notch, or no notch at all slight notch (instead of the slight notch of Cryptophilus). On the mesosternum, the rests for the foreleg coxae are not as well-developed as in Cryptophilus, but reduced to a V-shaped ridge. The mesosternum also has a parallel-sided process, but lacks a line formed by a distinct row of punctures. The joint between meso- and metasternum has an internal double knob, as is typical for Cryptophilini (but also for some related lineages, such as Languriinae). On the metasternum, there are no subcoxal lines, and its endosternite lacks muscle attachment plates projecting inside the body cavity. On the abdomen, there are no scattered glandular pores.

Wings and legs
The elytra of many Toramus species have a visible fuzz of straight or curled hairs, but in some members of this genus they are hairless and smooth; in all, however, they have irregularly scattered punctuations. On the parchment-like hindwings, the radial cell is present, and wing vein CuA2+3+4+AA1+2 does not contact the submedial dot. The foreleg tibiae have evenly spaced spines on the outer margin, unlike in Cryptophilus where the margin is smooth.

== Systematics ==
Some authors place this genus in tribe Toramini of subfamily Cryptophilinae, others accept fewer subfamilies in the Erotylidae and place the genus in tribe Cryptophilini in subfamily Xenoscelinae; neither approach may be correct, however. The genus Toramus is sometimes included in Cryptophilus and/or allied with Atomarops. But it may be closer to Triplax, which is placed in subfamily Tritominae, or – in taxonomic arrangements that reduce the number of erotylid subfamilies – in tribe Tritomini of the Erotylinae; however, this relationship was suggested by an analysis that did not include Cryptophilus. Earlier authors usually allied Toramus with the lizard beetles, at that time held to be a distinct family Languriidae but actually paraphyletic with Erotylidae and eventually merged into it.

About 45 species are placed in genus Toramus, including:

- Toramus acutus (Reitter, 1875)^{b g}
- Toramus arundinaceum^{i}
- Toramus bifasciatus (Kirsch, 1873)^{b}
- Toramus bisignatus (Horn, 1895)^{b g}
- Toramus chamaeropis (Schaeffer, 1904)^{b g i}
- Toramus formosianus (Grouvelle, 1913)^{b g i}
- Toramus glisonothoides^{i}
- Toramus hirtellus (Schwarz, 1878)^{b g i}
- Toramus obsoletus (Casey, 1900)^{b g}
- Toramus pilifer^{g i}
- Toramus pulchellus (LeConte, 1863)^{b g i}
- Toramus quadriguttatus^{i}
- Toramus quadrinotatus (Casey, 1924)^{b g}
- Toramus uenoi^{i}
- Toramus ventricosus (Casey, 1924)^{b g}

Data sources: b = BioLib.cz, g = GBIF, i = iNaturalist.
