= Missing Link (puzzle) =

Mechanical puzzle

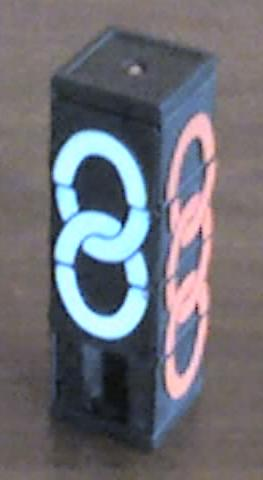
Missing Link puzzle

Missing Link is a mechanical puzzle invented in 1981 by Steven P. Hanson and Jeffrey D. Breslow.

The puzzle has four sides, each depicting a chain of a different color. Each side contains four tiles, except one which contains three tiles and a gap. The top and bottom rows can be rotated, and tiles can slide up or down into the gap. The objective is to scramble the tiles and then restore them to their original configuration.

The two middle rows cannot be rotated. To move tiles in these rows, you need to loop the tiles from one row to another, up and down.

There are 15 tiles and a gap, giving a maximum of 16 arrangements. However, the middle tiles of each four-tile chain are identical, and each position is equivalent to seven other positions obtained by rotating the entire puzzle (about its axis or upside-down), reducing the number of arrangements to 16 / 8 / 8 = 326,918,592,000. If the three long chains are also considered interchangeable, then the number of arrangements is further reduced to 16 / 8 / 8 / 6 = 54,486,432,000.

== Reception ==
Games magazine included Inner Circle in their "Top 100 Games of 1981", expecting it to be "the torture of the season" but instead found it was "solvable by ordinary human beings and will not provoke a rash of how-to books".

== See also ==
- Combination puzzles
- Mechanical puzzles
