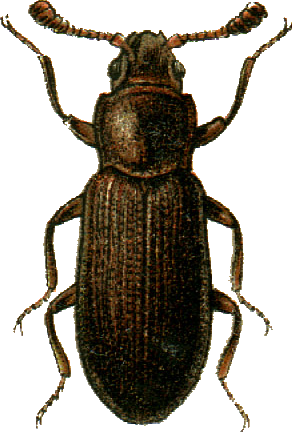
- Adult

Scientific classification
- Kingdom: Animalia
- Phylum: Arthropoda
- Clade: Pancrustacea
- Class: Insecta
- Order: Coleoptera
- Suborder: Polyphaga
- Infraorder: Cucujiformia
- Family: Erotylidae
- Genus: Zavaljus; Reitter, 1880
- Species: Z. brunneus

Binomial name
- Zavaljus brunneus (Gyllenhal, 1808)

Synonyms
- Genus-level: Eicalyctus (lapsus); Eicolyctus J.R.Sahlberg, 1919 Species-level: Cryptophagus brunneus Gyllenhal, 1808; Eicalyctus brunneus (lapsus); Eicolyctus brunneus (Gyllenhal, 1808); Zavaljus fausti Reitter, 1880

= Zavaljus =

Genus of beetles

Zavaljus is a monotypic genus in the pleasing fungus beetle family (Erotylidae). The single species Zavaljus brunneus inhabits eastern Europe. This beetle has been considered rare and elusive, even though it seems to be widespread, with no apparent signs of decline. Its highly unusual habits – unsuspected by scientists until the mid-20th century – cause it to be easily overlooked, however, and it might even be more common than generally assumed.

While this beetle does not seem to have an English name, in Swedish it is known by the rather generic term umbrabagge ("umber beetle"), in reference to its uniform rich dark-brown color.

== Taxonomy and systematics ==
Genus Zavaljus was established in 1880 by Edmund Reitter to contain the single species Zavaljus fausti described in the same work. This species was eventually found to be the same as the Cryptophagus brunneus named by Leonard Gyllenhaal in 1808, resulting in the current name of Zavaljus brunneus. Before that, however, Johan Sahlberg had realized that Gyllenhaal's beetle was no Cryptophagus, and established the genus Eicolyctus (sometimes mis-spelled Eicalyctus) for it; this is now synonymized with Zavaljus.

This genus is placed in subfamily Xenoscelinae; if this is more loosely defined (to include Loberinae etc as tribes), Zavaljus is placed in tribe Xenoscelini. Earlier, as Eicolyctus brunneus, it was allied with the lizard beetles and placed with these into a distinct family "Languriidae"; this turned out to be paraphyletic with the Erotylidae and was subsumed therein.

== Distribution and ecology ==
Z.brunneus is found in eastern and northeastern Europe, primarily around the Gulf of Bothnia (northern Sweden and southern Finland). More sparsely, it has been reported from Poland, Latvia, Slovakia, and western Russia; most likely it also occurs in Belarus, Estonia and Lithuania.

This beetle is generally encountered in well-wooded habitat, usually primary or secondary broadleaf or mixed forests. It requires the presence of dry snags with densely grained wood to thrive, and might become temporarily more common after moderately-sized forest fires which leave numerous dead and dying trees standing exposed to the sun.

Larvae of Z.brunneus have been retrieved from the wood of maples (Acer), alders (Alnus), birch (Betula) and poplars (Populus, e.g. Eurasian aspen P.tremula), which are all deciduous trees of the rosid clade. Larvae found in November hatched into adults the following March.

In Białowieża Forest, Z.brunneus was found to share pieces of dead wood with a considerable diversity of other beetles from the same infraorder Cucujiformia: the cocoon-forming beetle Bothrideres bipunctatus (Bothrideridae), the bark-dwelling Cerylon histeroides (Cerylonidae), the minute brown scavenger beetle Latridius assimilis (Latridiidae), the longhorn beetle Xylotrechus rusticus (Cerambycidae), and the rare darkling beetle Neomida haemorrhoidalis (Tenebrionidae).

More important to Z.brunneus at that location is the presence of another longhorn beetle, Macroleptura thoracica. Its breeding tunnels in the deadwood were found to be taken over by Crabronidae wasps, which had dumped paralyzed arthropods there for their offspring to eat. Z.brunneus, meanwhile, is a specialized kleptoparasite, which feeds on the wasps' food stores. Kleptoparasitism is rare among European Coleoptera; among the few other known examples are the skin beetle Dermestes palmi which steals food from ants, and the rove beetle Quedius dilatatus which raids Vespidae wasp nests. Among the Polyphaga suborder, which contains the bulk of beetles, D.palmi and Q.dilatatus are neither closely related to each other, nor is either close to Z.brunneus.
