= Anal cell =

Rear components of the insect wings

Anal cells are rear components of the insect wings, found for example in Diptera (flies). A cell, in the case of an insect wing, is the central area surrounded by veins. It can be closed by veins or open.
