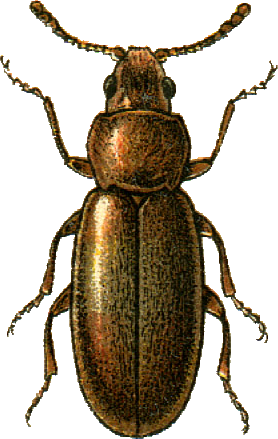
- Macrophagus robustus

Scientific classification
- Kingdom: Animalia
- Phylum: Arthropoda
- Clade: Pancrustacea
- Class: Insecta
- Order: Coleoptera
- Suborder: Polyphaga
- Infraorder: Cucujiformia
- Family: Erotylidae
- Subfamily: Xenoscelinae; Ganglbauer, 1899

Synonyms
- Xenoscelini Ganglbauer, 1899 (but see text)

= Xenoscelinae =

Subfamily of beetles

Xenoscelinae is a subfamily of the pleasing fungus beetles (family Erotylidae). They have been recorded from almost all over the world, but most genera are small or monotypic; also, circumscription of this subfamily heavily varies among authors.

Some define the subfamily more widely, downranking the Cryptophilinae (including Empocryptinae and Toraminae), Loberinae and Pharaxonothinae (including Setariolinae) to tribes of subfamily Xenoscelinae, in which case the core xenoscelines also become a tribe Xenoscelini. Earlier, all these taxa were usually considered to be more closely related to the lizard beetles than to the "typical" pleasing fungus beetles of subfamily Erotylinae, and united with the lizard beetles in a distinct family Languriidae. But the "Languriidae" turned out to be paraphyletic with Erotylidae and eventually were merged into it, leading to a re-sorting of subtaxa that is still not defintely resolved as of 2025.

== Genera ==
These genera belong to the subfamily Xenoscelinae in its narrow definition (= tribe Xenoscelini, if the Xenoscelinae are defined sensu lato):

- Arrowcryptus Leschen & Węgrzynowicz, 2008
- Leucohimatiops Heller, 1923
- Loberonotha Sen Gupta and Crowson, 1969
- Macrophagus Motschulsky, 1845
- Othniocryptus Sharp, 1900
- Protoloberus Leschen, 2003
- Xenocryptus Arrow, 1929
- Xenoscelis Wollaston, 1864
- Zavaljus Reitter, 1880

The former genus Rhopalocryptus, believed to be a xenosceline pleasing fungus beetle, is actually a narrow-waisted bark beetle (family Salpingidae) of genus Trogocryptoides.

Two fossil genera have been assigned to the Xenoscelinae in its narrow circumscription:

- †Khasurtyphilus Lyubarsky & Perkovsky, 2025
- †Turgaphilus Lyubarsky & Perkovsky, 2025 (Barremian – Aptian)

Another fossil genus from Late Eocene Rovno amber belongs to the Xenoscelinae sensu lato, but whether it warrants inclusion in the narrowly defined subfamily is not certain:

- †Xenohimatium Lyubarsky & Perkovsky, 2012
