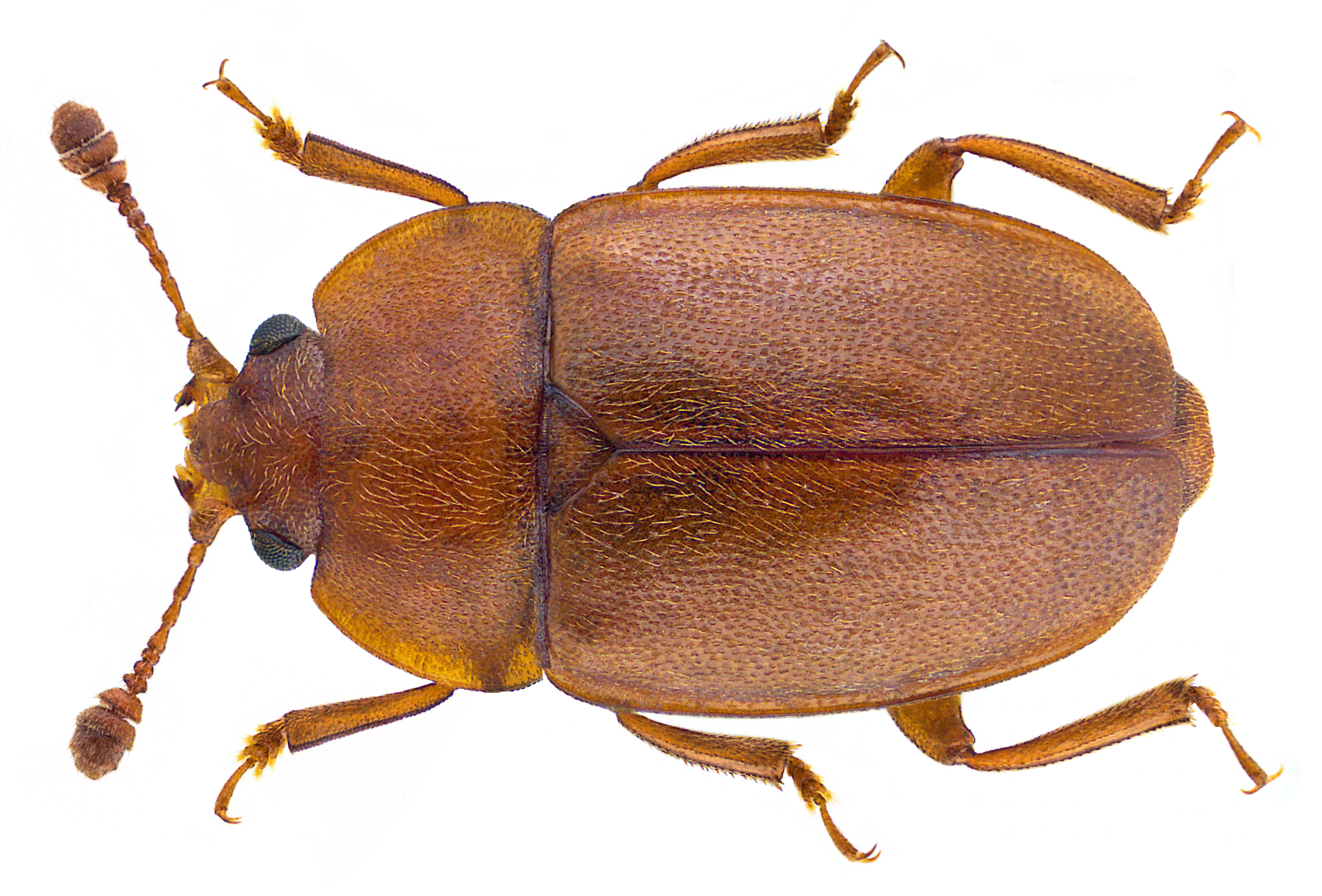
- Epuraea aestiva

Scientific classification
- Kingdom: Animalia
- Phylum: Arthropoda
- Clade: Pancrustacea
- Class: Insecta
- Order: Coleoptera
- Suborder: Polyphaga
- Infraorder: Cucujiformia
- Family: Nitidulidae
- Subfamily: Epuraeinae
- Genus: Epuraea; Erichson, 1843

Synonyms
- Haptoncus Murray, 1864

= Epuraea =

Genus of beetles

Epuraea is a genus of sap-feeding beetles in the family Nitidulidae, first described in 1843 by Wilhelm Ferdinand Erichson. There are almost 200 described species in Epuraea. Their most notable food source is sap but these beetles also feed on organic matter such as fruits, flowers, fungi, decaying plant tissue, and the tissue of dead animals. Some species occur in bumblebee nests. Epuraea beetles commonly overwinter underneath logs or in soil.

== Description ==
According to a key to North American nitidulid genera, Epuraea has the following combination of features: head vertical, labrum free, prothorax not margined at base, elytra truncate apically to expose only pygidium (and, at most, the posterior edge of the penultimate abdominal tergite), middle and hind tibiae with two rows of small marginal spines on their outer edges, a tarsal formula of 5-5-5 (meaning each tarsus has five segments), and the first three tarsomeres bilobed.

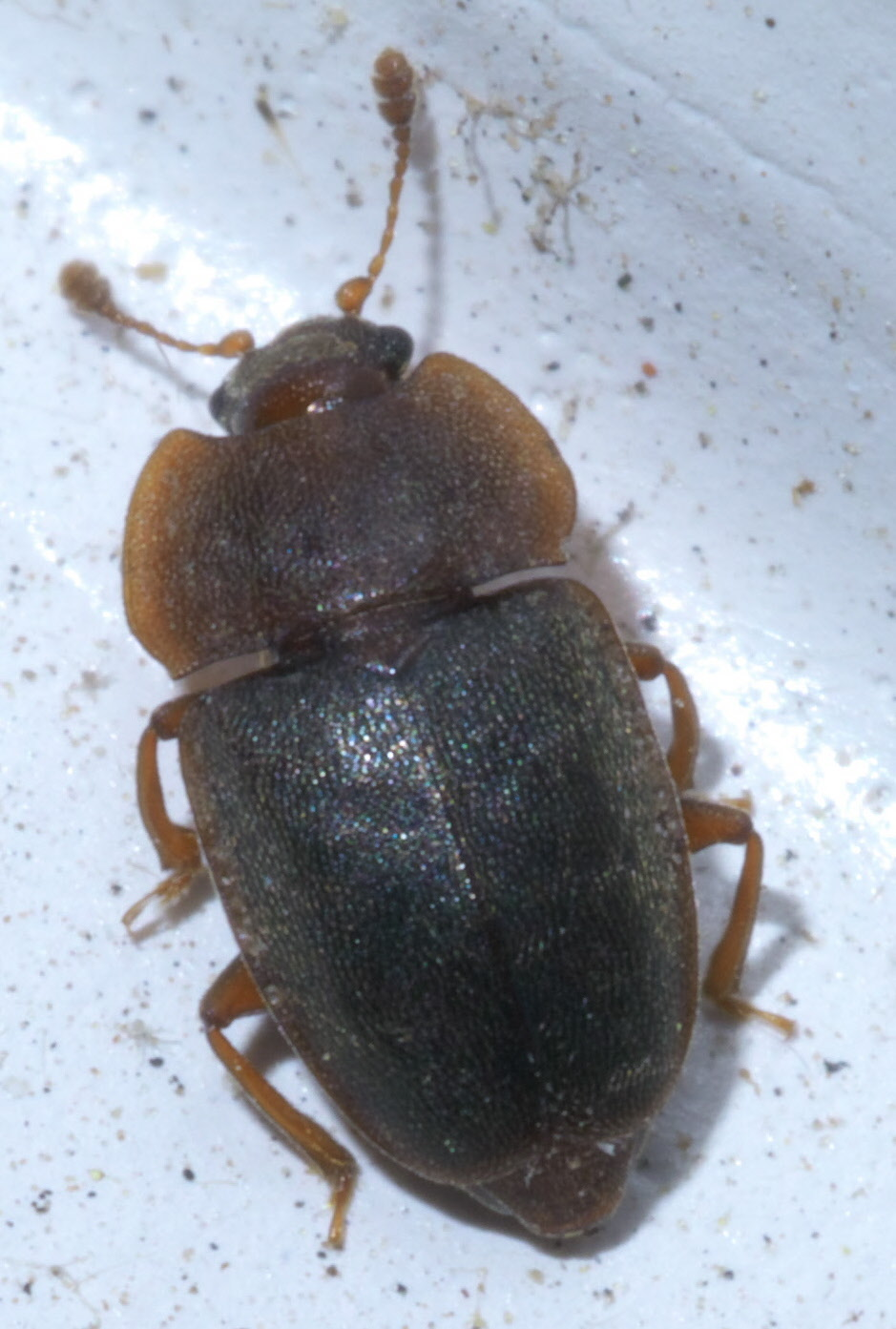
Epuraea rufa

== See also ==
- List of Epuraea species
