= Paw Paw =

Paw Paw, Paw paw, or pawpaw may refer to:

== Plants and fruits ==
- Asimina, a genus of trees and shrubs native to eastern North America, commonly known as pawpaws
  - Common pawpaw (Asimina triloba), a temperate fruit tree, native to eastern North America
- Papaya (Carica papaya), a widely cultivated tropical fruit tree
- Mountain paw paw (Vasconcellea pubescens), a fruit tree native to South America

== Places ==
In the United States

- List of lakes named Paw Paw Lake
- Paw Paw, Illinois
- Paw Paw Township, DeKalb County, Illinois
- Paw Paw Township, Wabash County, Indiana
- Paw Paw, Indiana (Miami County)
- Paw Paw Township, Elk County, Kansas
- Paw Paw, Kentucky
- Paw Paw, Michigan
- Paw Paw Township, Michigan
- Paw Paw River, in Michigan
- Paw Paw, Missouri
- Paw Paw, Marion County, West Virginia
- Paw Paw, West Virginia, in Morgan County
- Paw Paw Creek, in Marion County and Monongalia County, West Virginia

== Other uses ==
- Paw Paw High School (disambiguation)
- Paw Paw Railroad (Michigan), a defunct railroad which operated in Van Buren County, Michigan, between 1857 and 1887
- Paw Paw Tunnel, in Maryland
- "paw-paw French", a nickname of the Missouri French

== See also ==
- Pawpawsaurus, or pawpaw Lizard, a dinosaur
- Paw Paws, a television cartoon series
- "pawpaw" may be an affectionate term for a grandfather
