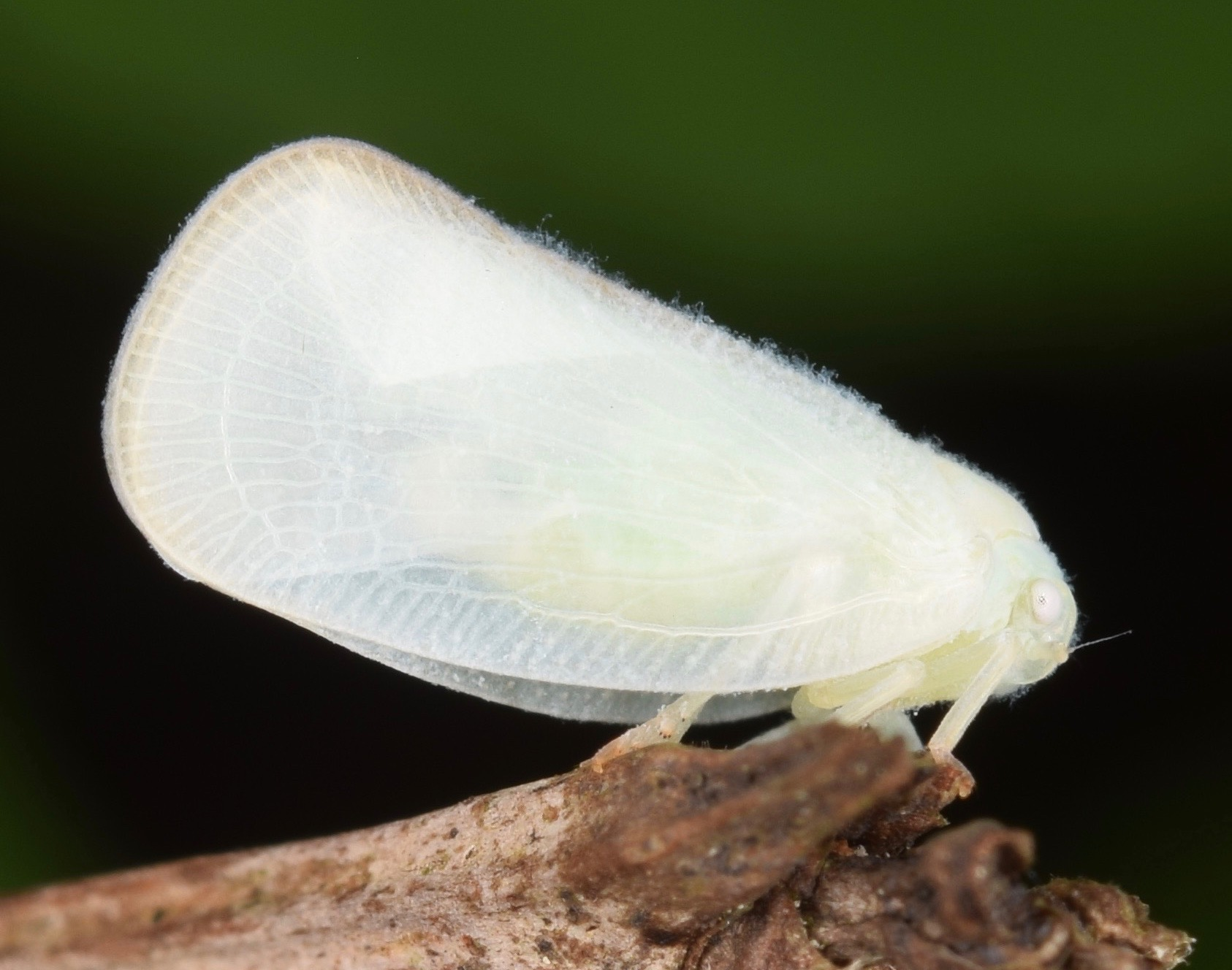

Scientific classification
- Domain: Eukaryota
- Kingdom: Animalia
- Phylum: Arthropoda
- Class: Insecta
- Order: Hemiptera
- Suborder: Auchenorrhyncha
- Infraorder: Fulgoromorpha
- Family: Flatidae
- Subfamily: Flatinae
- Tribe: Nephesini
- Genus: Ormenoides
- Species: O. venusta

Binomial name
- Ormenoides venusta (Melichar, 1902)

= Ormenoides venusta =

Species of planthopper

Ormenoides venusta is a species of flatid planthopper in the family Flatidae, found in North America. This species is univoltine, with first instars emerging in May. It feeds on paw paw leaves.

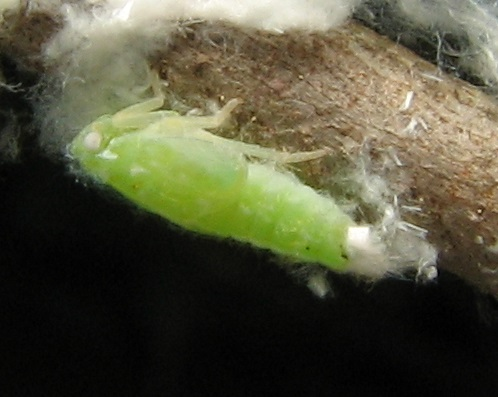
Nymph
