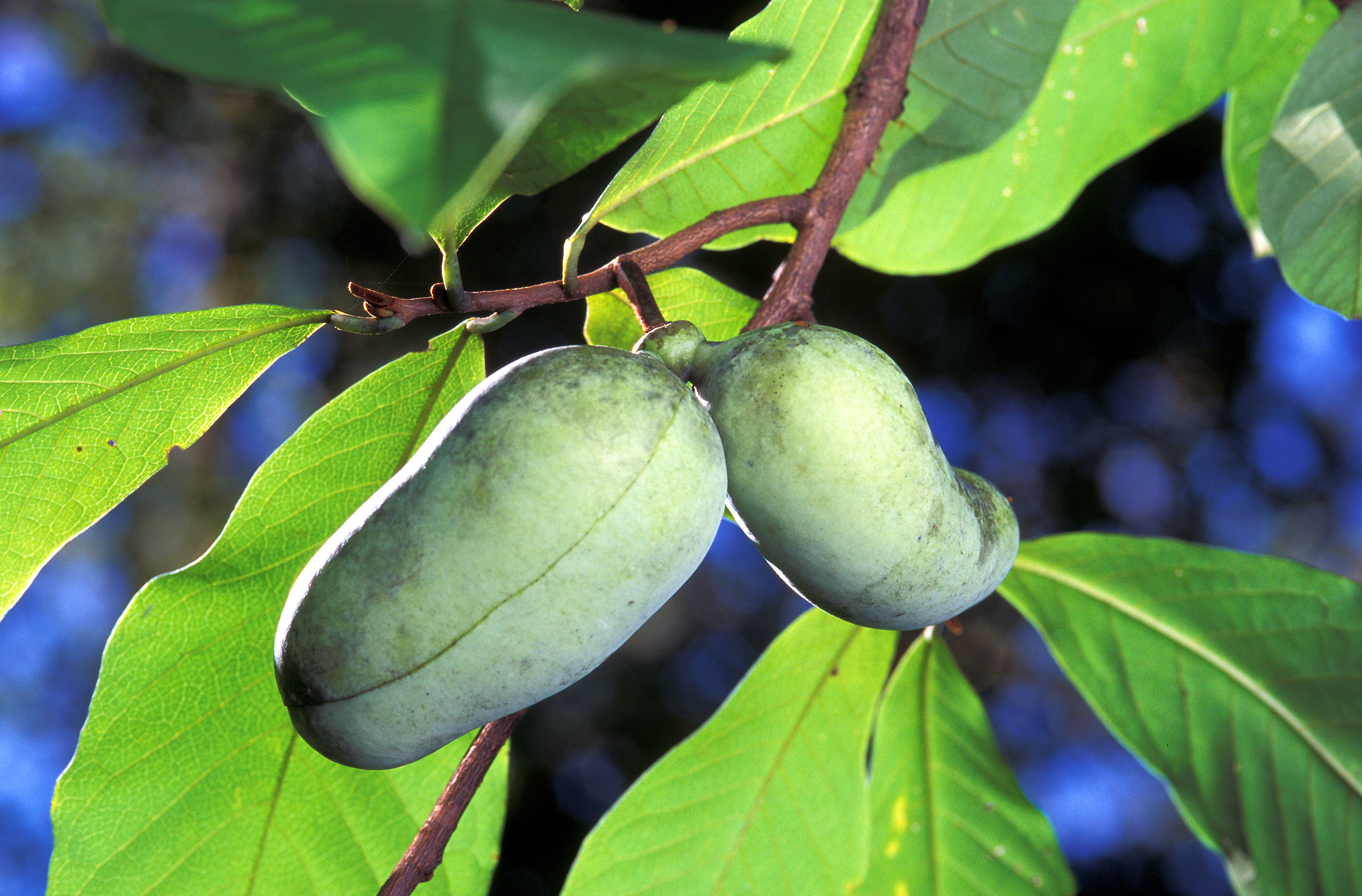
- In fruit

Conservation status
- Least Concern (IUCN 3.1)

- Secure (NatureServe)

Scientific classification
- Kingdom: Plantae
- Clade: Tracheophytes
- Clade: Angiosperms
- Clade: Magnoliids
- Order: Magnoliales
- Family: Annonaceae
- Genus: Asimina
- Species: A. triloba

Binomial name
- Asimina triloba (L.) Dunal
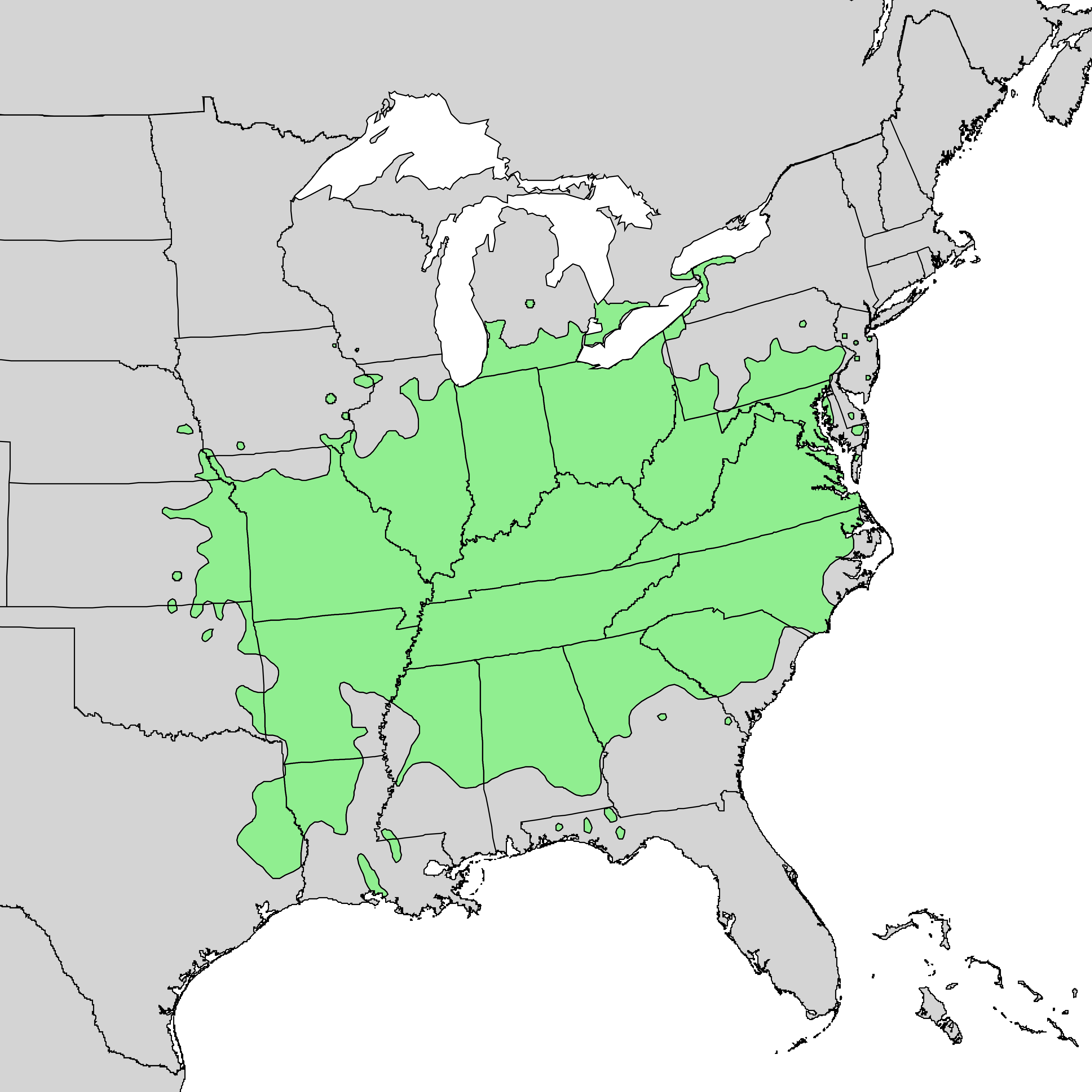
- Natural range

= Asimina triloba =

Species of tree

Asimina triloba, the American papaw, pawpaw, paw paw, or paw-paw, among many regional names, is a species of small deciduous tree. It has large leaves and produces a large, yellowish-green to brown fruit.

The species is native to eastern North America, in a more temperate range than its tropical relatives. It is a patch-forming (clonal) understory tree of hardwood forests, being found in well-drained, deep, fertile bottomland and also hilly upland habitat.

Although much of the plant contains the neurotoxin annonacin, the ripe fruits are edible. They are sweet, with a custard-like texture and a flavor somewhat similar to banana or pineapple. They are commonly eaten raw, but are also used to make ice cream and baked desserts.

== Description ==
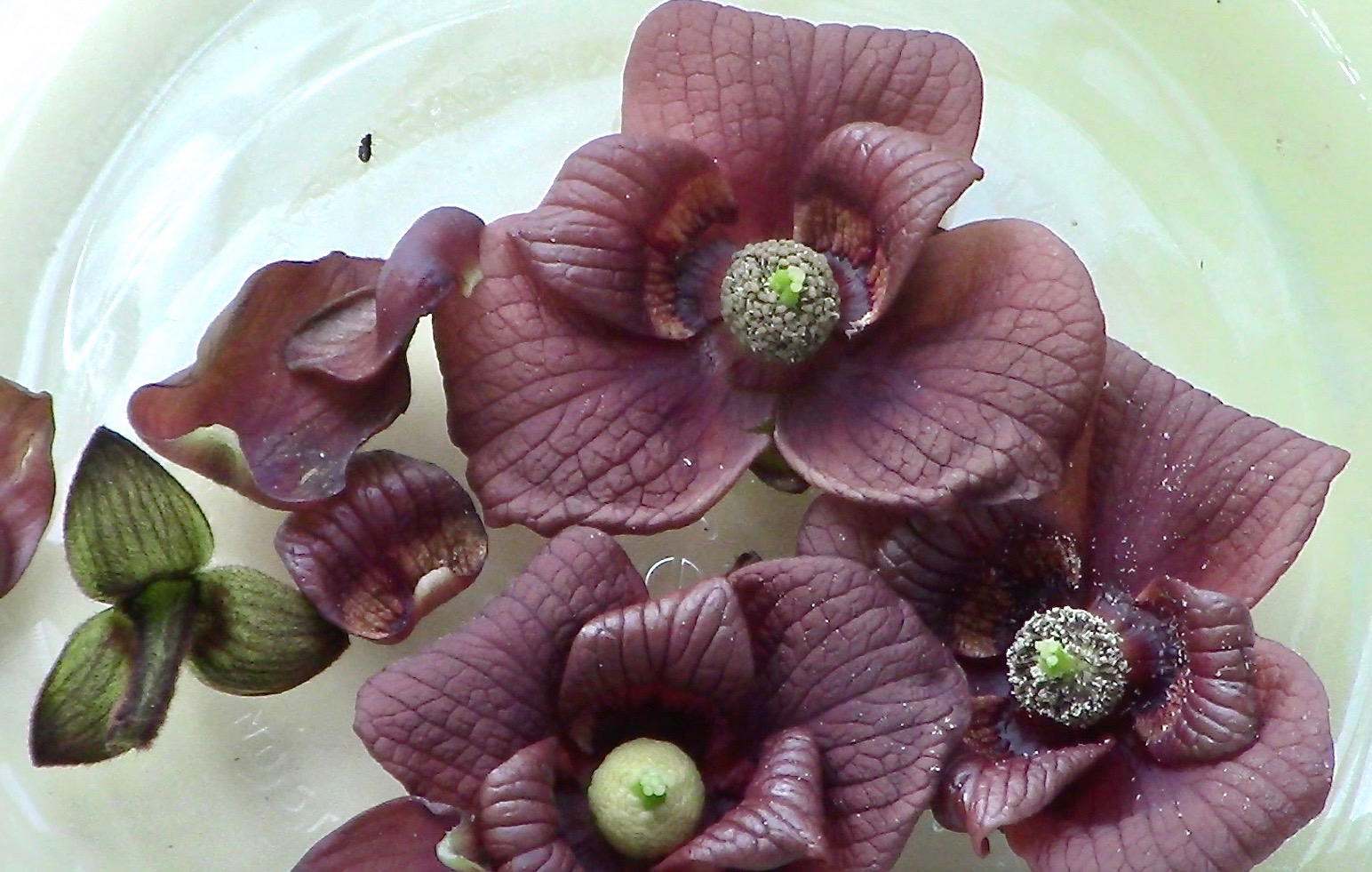
Flower parts and stages (female at bottom, pollen-rich male at right)

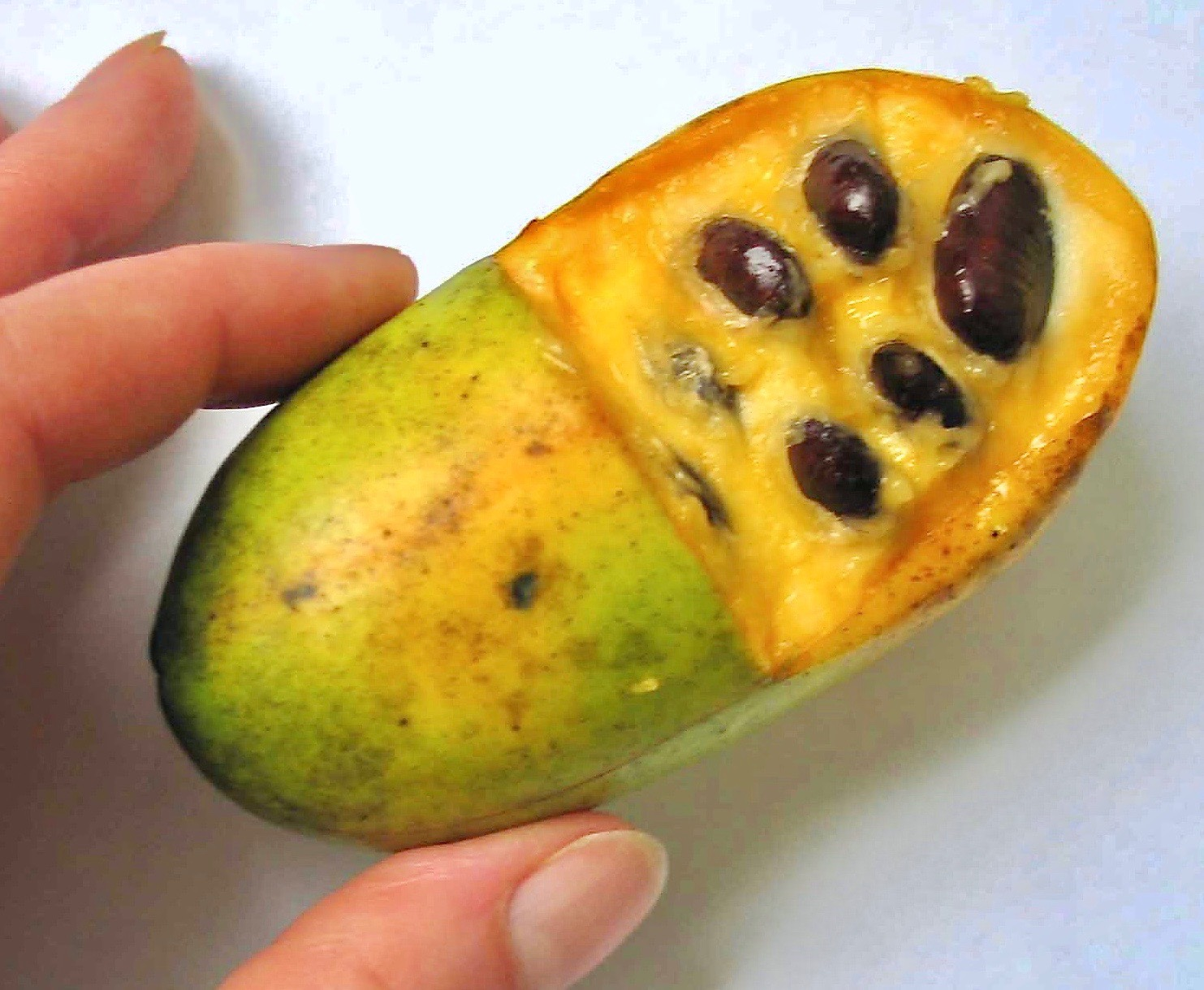
Ripe fruit of Asimina triloba, cut open to reveal the large seeds

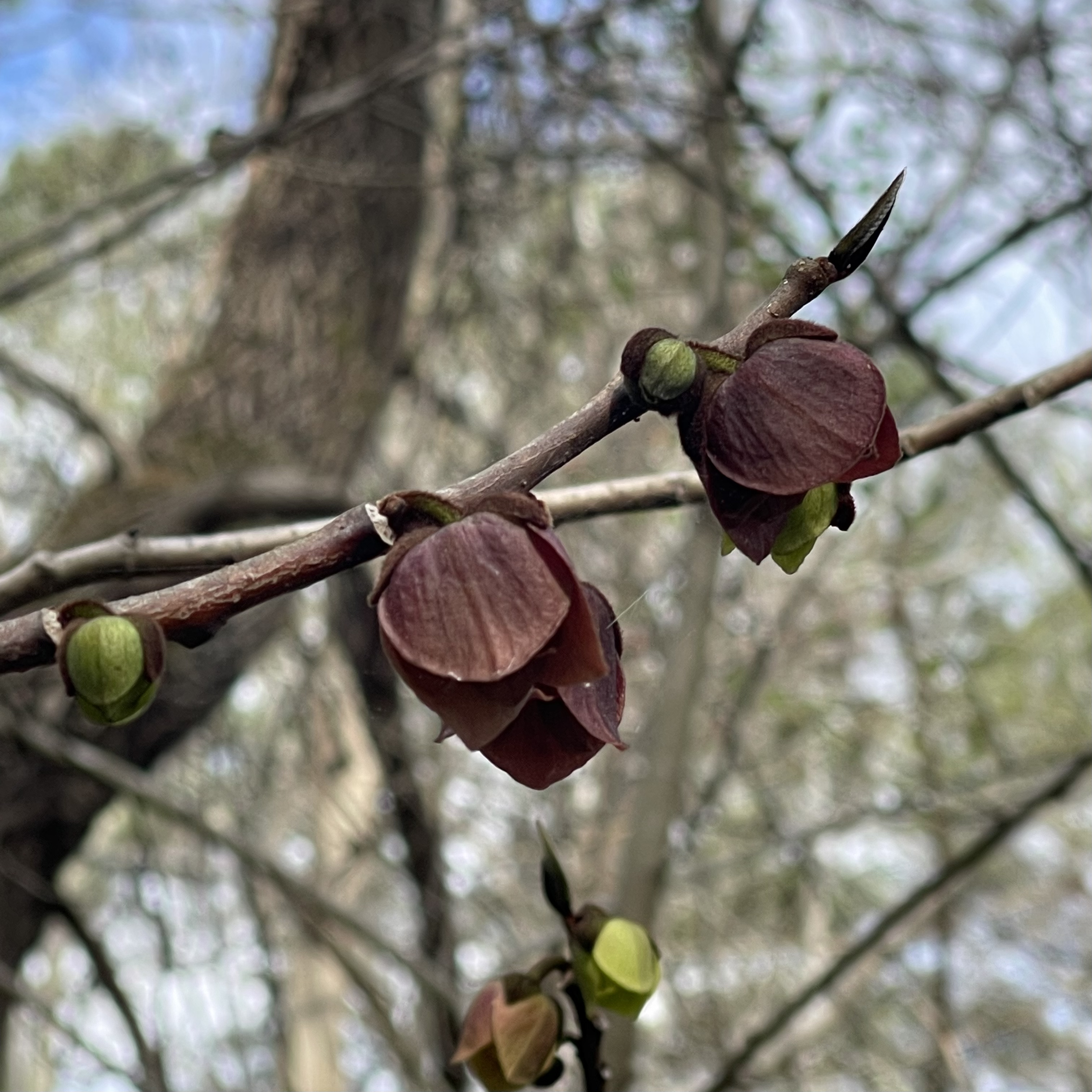
Pawpaw produces flowers before its leaves emerge (proteranthous).

A. triloba is a large shrub or small tree growing to a height of 35 ft (11 m), rarely as tall as 45 ft (14 m), with trunks 8–12 in (20–30 cm) or more in diameter. The large leaves of pawpaw trees are clustered symmetrically at the ends of the branches, giving a distinctive imbricated appearance to the tree's foliage. The large leaves with drip tips are more characteristic of plants in tropical rainforests than within this species' temperate range.

The leaves of the species are simple, alternate and spirally arranged, entire, deciduous, obovate-lanceolate, 10–12 in (25–30 cm) long, 4–5 in (10–13 cm) broad, and wedge-shaped at the base, with an acute apex and an entire margin, with the midrib and primary veins prominent. The petioles are short and stout, with a prominent adaxial groove. Stipules are lacking. The expanding leaves are conduplicate, green, covered with rusty tomentum beneath, and hairy above; when fully grown they are smooth, dark green above, and paler beneath. When bruised, the leaves have a disagreeable odor similar to a green bell pepper. In autumn, the leaves are a rusty yellow, allowing pawpaw groves to be spotted from a long distance.

Pawpaw flowers are perfect and protogynous, about 1–2 in (3–5 cm) across, rich red-purple or maroon when mature, with three sepals and six petals. They are borne singly on stout, hairy, axillary peduncles. The flowers are produced in early spring at the same time as or slightly before the new leaves appear, and have a faint fetid or yeasty smell to attract pollinators.

The fruit of the pawpaw is a large, yellowish-green to brown berry, 2–6 in (5–15 cm) long and 1–3 in (3–8 cm) broad, weighing from 0.7–18 oz (20–510 g), containing several brown or black seeds 1/2–1 in (15–25 mm) in diameter embedded in the soft, edible fruit pulp. The conspicuous fruits begin developing after the plants flower; they are initially green, maturing by September or October to green, yellowish green, or brown. When mature, the heavy fruits bend the weak branches down. Full ripening often happens only after the fruit falls naturally, thus signifying a seed dispersal strategy aimed at ground-based, rather than arboreal, mammals.

Other characteristics:

- Calyx: Sepals three, valvate in bud, ovate, acuminate, pale green, downy
- Corolla: Petals six, in two rows, imbricate in the bud; inner row acute, erect, nectariferous; outer row broadly ovate, reflexed at maturity; petals at first are green, then brown, and finally become dull purple or maroon and conspicuously veiny
- Stamens: Indefinite, densely packed on the globular receptacle; filaments short; anthers extrorse, two-celled, opening longitudinally
- Pollen: Shed as permanent tetrads
- Pistils: Several, on the summit of the receptacle, projecting from the mass of stamens; ovary one-celled; stigma sessile; ovules many
- Branchlets: Light brown, tinged with red, marked by shallow grooves
- Winter buds: Small, of two kinds, the leaf buds pointed and closely appressed to the twigs, and the flower buds round, brown, and fuzzy
- Bark: Light gray, sometimes blotched with lighter gray spots, sometimes covered with small excrescences, divided by shallow fissures; inner bark tough, fibrous; bark with a very disagreeable odor when bruised
- Wood: Pale, greenish yellow, sapwood lighter; light, soft, coarse-grained and spongy with a specific gravity of 0.3969 and a density of 24.74 pounds per cubic foot (396.3 kg/m^{3})
- Longevity of fruit production: Undetermined

== Taxonomy ==
Asimina triloba is a member of the Annonaceae family, commonly referred to as the "custard-apple" or "soursop" family. Annonaceae are a diverse group comprising the single largest family of the order Magnoliales. They are a tropical family consisting of 112 accepted genera with about 2,200 species spread primarily across South America, Africa, and Southeast Asia.

=== Etymology ===
This plant's scientific name is Asimina triloba. The genus name Asimina is adapted from the Native American (probably Miami-Illinois) name assimin or rassimin combining the root terms rassi = "divided lengthwise into equal parts" and min = "seed, fruit, nut, berry, etc." through the French colonial asiminier. The specific epithet triloba in the species' scientific name refers to its lobed fruits (three lobes, "fructibus trifidus", in Carl Linnaeus' original description).

The common name "(common) pawpaw", also spelled "paw paw", "paw-paw", and "papaw", probably derives from the Spanish papaya (itself probably from Arawakan), perhaps because of the superficial similarity of their fruits. As the spelling "papaw" reflects, "pawpaw" was originally pronounced with stress on the second syllable, like "papaya". Initial-syllable stress became usual in the 20th century.

== Distribution and habitat ==
Asimina is the only genus native to temperate regions within the otherwise tropical and subtropical flowering plant family Annonaceae. A. triloba has the northernmost range of any species in the family, extending north into southern Ontario, Canada. Within the United States, pawpaw is native to the eastern, southern, and midwestern states, ranging from New York westward to southeastern Nebraska, southward to eastern Texas and the panhandle of Florida. Pawpaw has even been successfully cultivated as far north as Nova Scotia, Canada and in several regions of Europe and Asia. Pawpaws typically grow in USDA hardiness zones 5 to 8, though some growers have had success cultivating them in USDA hardiness zone 4b with careful site selection and protection to compensate for the shorter growing season.

Within its natural habitat, pawpaw grows in slightly acidic (pH 5.5 – 7.0), well-drained soils. These trees typically establish as part of the understory in Eastern Temperate Forest (Carolinian Forest) region. Pawpaws are also found along floodplains, stream banks, and shaded, nutrient-rich bottomlands, but they prefer gently elevated slopes because it has a deep-reaching taproot. While pawpaws are shade tolerant, maximum fruit yields occur under full sun conditions with some wind protection. However, germinating seedlings are extremely sensitive to full sun and require partial shading during their first one or two years.

== Ecology ==
=== Hybridization with other Asimina species ===
The common pawpaw is the largest and most well known of the 13 species of the Asimina genus in North America. Of those 13, 11 prefer very warm weather and have ranges rarely extending northward of Florida or coastal Alabama. Their ranges do not overlap with Asimina triloba.

One southern U.S. species, Asimina parviflora, does overlap in range with pawpaw. This species is smaller than pawpaw in both its flower and its woody growth. A. parviflora is more shrublike, rarely growing even a third as tall as pawpaw. Genomically verified hybrids of A. triloba and A. parviflora have been classified as Asimina × piedmontana.

=== Pollination ===
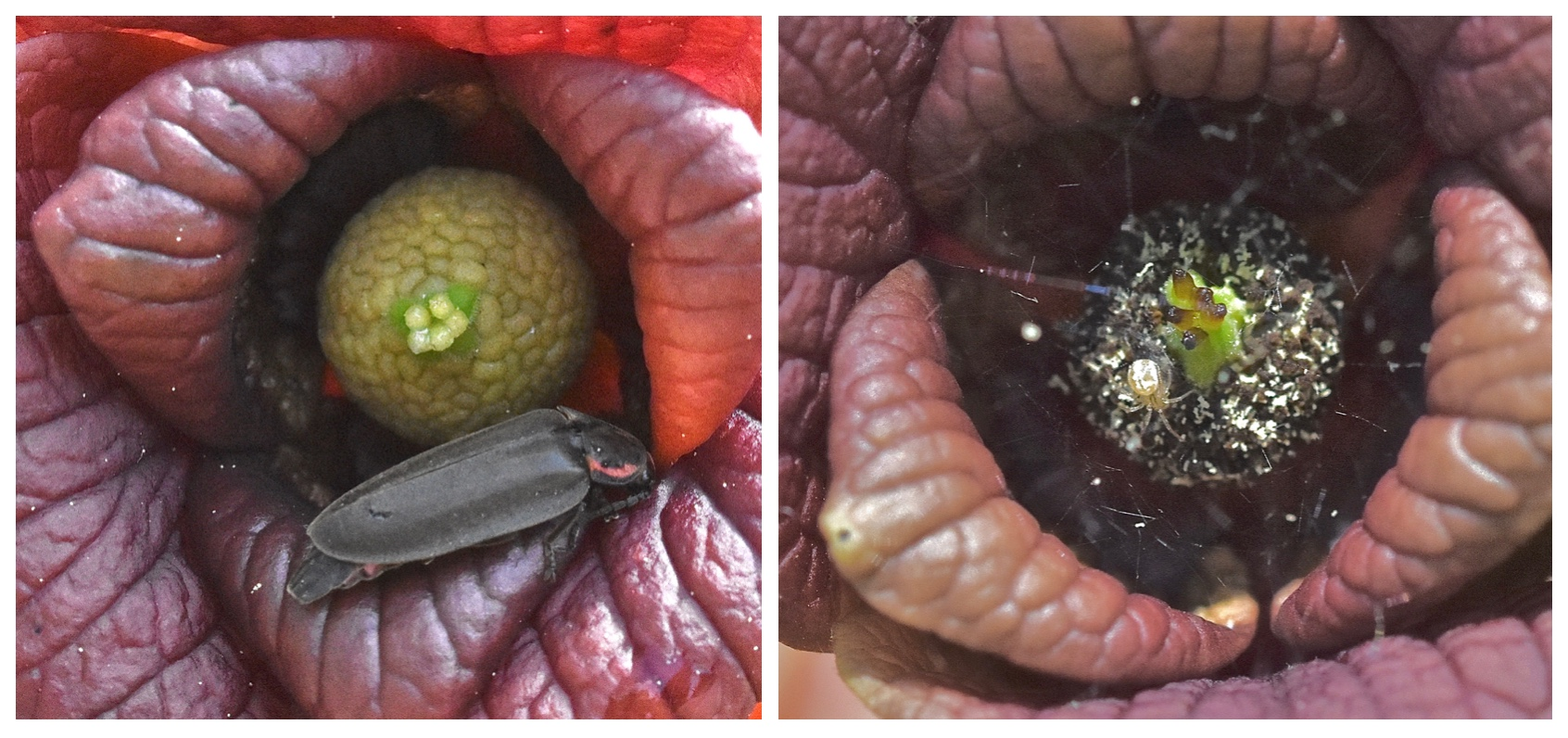
Downward-hanging pawpaw flowers attract many kinds of insects that are not effective cross-pollinators. Female flower stage at left; male at right.

Pawpaw are self-incompatible, meaning pollen cannot fertilize flowers on the same plant. This, coupled with the pawpaw's tendency to form clonal patches, can reduce fertilization success. A single patch consisting of many stems may therefore produce no fruit if all stems are genetically identical. Fruitless pawpaw patches have been documented in Ohio.

The floral scent of Asimina triloba has been described as "yeasty", which is one of several features that signify a "beetle pollination syndrome". Other floral features of pawpaw indicative of beetle pollination include petals that curve over the downward-pointing flower center, along with food-rich fleshy bases of the inner whorl of petals. A "pollination chamber" is thereby created at a depth that only small beetles can access during the initial female-receptive stage of floral bloom. As with other well-studied species of Annonaceae, the delay in the shift from female to male floral stage offers beetles a secure, and possibly thermogenic, residence in which not only to feed but also to mate. Receptive stigmas at their arrival, followed by pollen-shedding stamens during pollinator departure, are regarded as an early form of mutualism evolved between plants and insects that is still dominant in the most ancient lineages of flowering plants, including the Magnoliids (of which Annonaceae is the most species-rich taxonomic family).

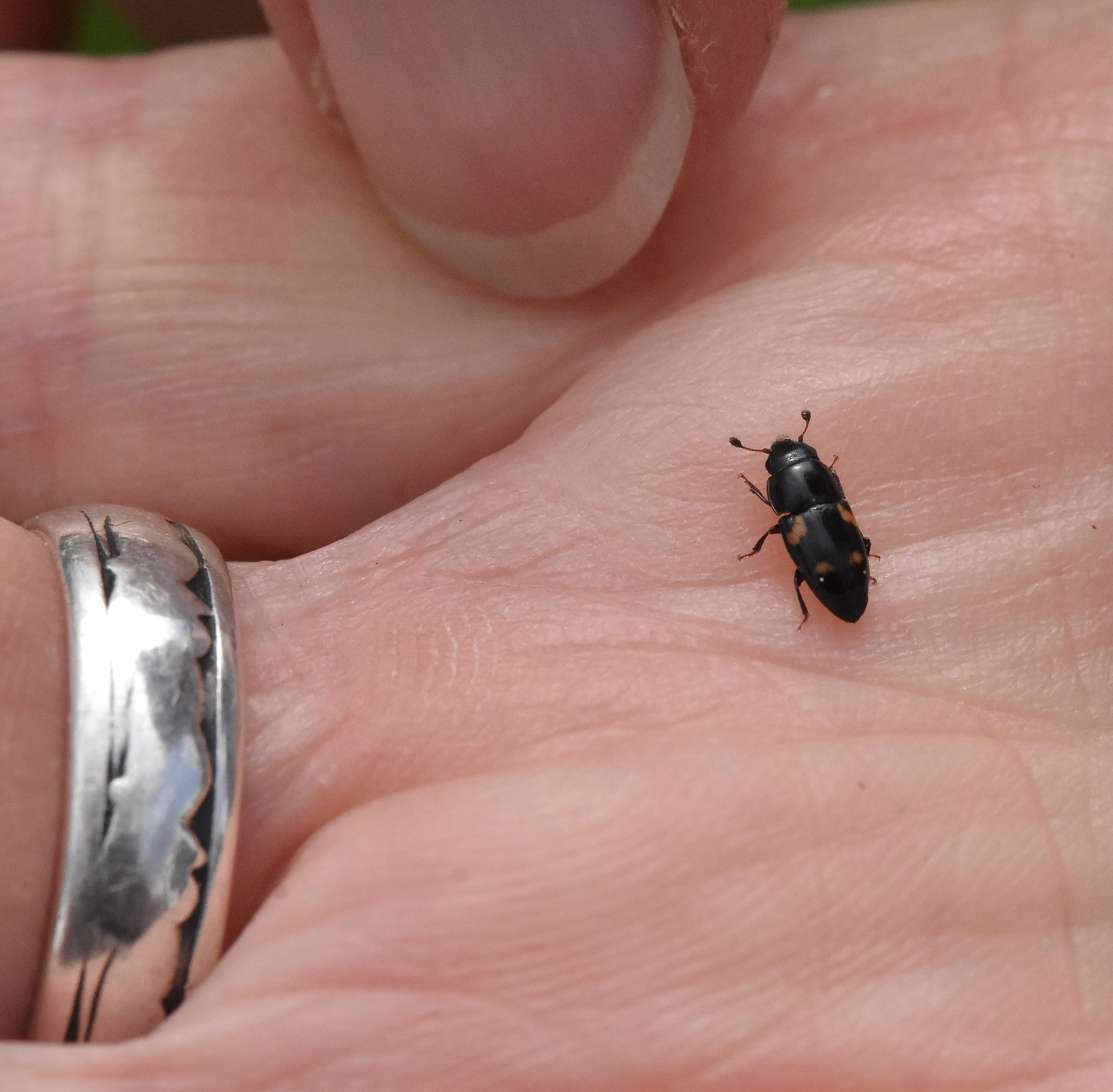
Glischrochilus quadrisignatus ("Four-spotted sap beetle") is one of two tiny beetle species documented deep inside pawpaw flowers in Michigan.

Beetles are the dominant form of pollinator ascribed for genera and species within the Annonaceae family. However, two species of genus Asimina (Asimina triloba and Asimina parviflora) bear a floral character that has given rise to an alternative hypothesis that carrion or dung flies are their effective pollinators. That floral characteristic is the dark maroon color of the petals. Hence, while no scholarly papers have documented carrion or dung flies as effective pollinators in field observations, the strength of this hypothesis has led some horticultural growers to place carrion in pawpaw orchards during the bloom time.

Professional papers on genus Asimina and its species have warned of the difficulties in discerning whether insects observed on or collected from flowers are effective pollinators or merely casual and thus opportunistic visitors.

A citizen science project in southern Michigan utilized natural history forms of observation, along with video and photo documentation, during a "pawpaw pollinator watch" in May 2021. Two species of tiny sap beetle were reported as the most abundant and the most consistently present insect types at depth within the flowers, and thus as the most likely effective pollinators. The two species are Glischrochilus quadrisignatus and Stelidota geminata. Both are in the taxonomic family Nitidulidae. Nitidulid beetles are described by Clemson University as likely "night flying" pollinators of pawpaw.

Larvae and adult beetle stages of Glischrochilus quadrisignatus were also documented by the citizen project on the ground-level side of rotting fruit in a pawpaw orchard in Michigan following the fruit harvest. This aligns with scientific reports of well-studied relatives of pawpaw: the cherimoya and other valued fruits of the subtropical genus Annona. Because the beetle pollinators are not strong fliers, their entire lifecycle must be facilitated onsite in both orchard and forest restoration settings. Abundant leaves, rotting fruit, and other organic material on the ground beneath or near the flowering trees are crucial for the larval stage of the beetle. There, eggs are laid and the larvae hatch and feed on decaying matter, then dig downward into the soil layer to pupate through the winter. Beetles emerge when flowering begins the following year.

=== Seed dispersal ===
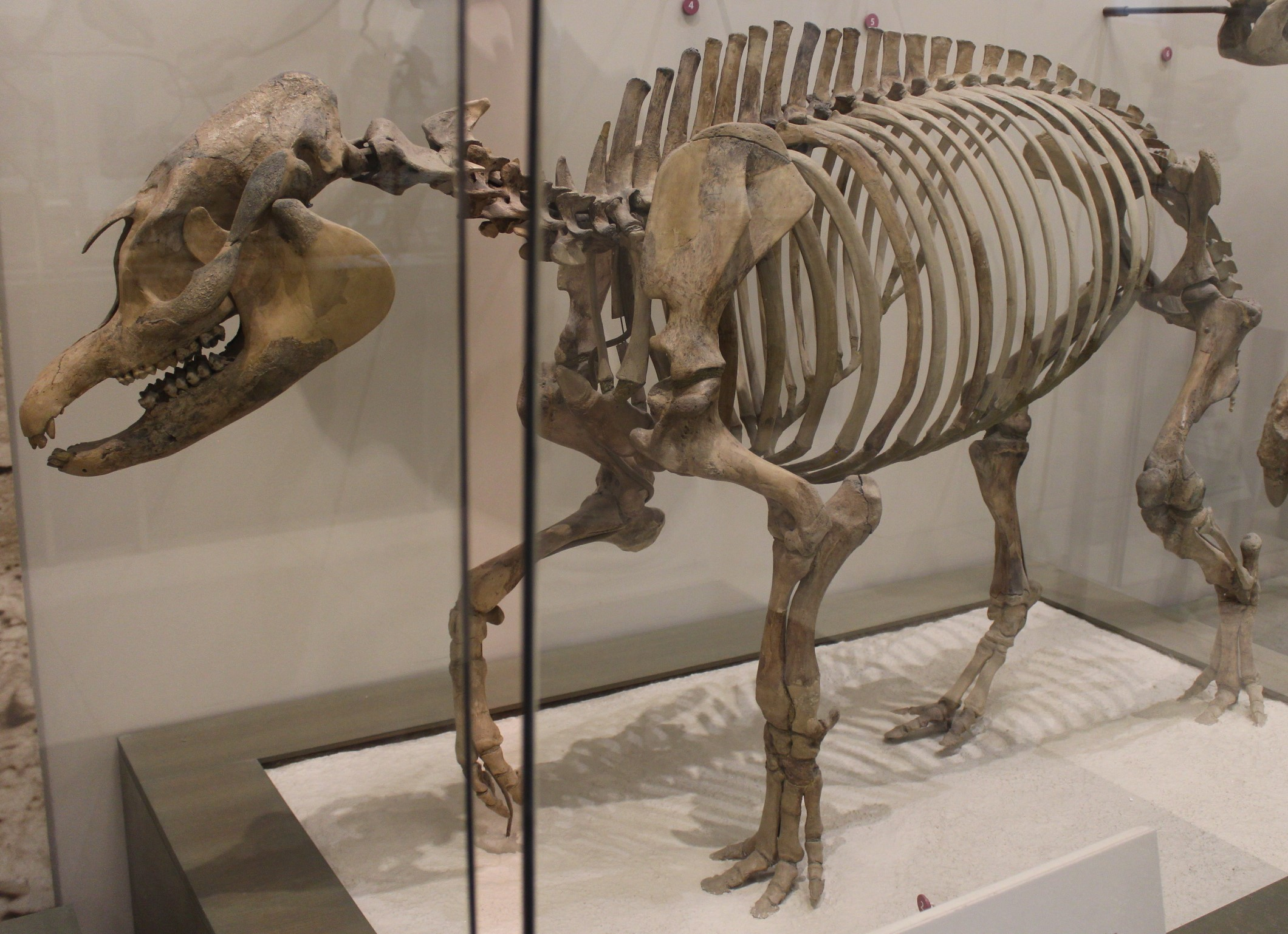
A fossilized vero tapir (Tapirus veroensis) skeleton, a potential pawpaw disperser. The related South American tapir (Tapirus terrestris) is a disperser of Annonaceae fruit in Brazil.

Until the expansion of humans into North America at the end of the Pleistocene, dispersal of the large pawpaw seeds would primarily have occurred via the dung of certain megafauna (such as mastodons, mammoths, and giant ground sloths). The fruit of pawpaw is thus recognized as having coevolved with large mammals serving as long-distance seed dispersers.

The megafaunal dispersal syndrome is a common feature of some plants native to the Western Hemisphere, where a large proportion of megafauna went extinct near the end of the glacial episodes. Such fruits are now regarded as evolutionary anachronisms. Their anatomical features, such as seeds too big for today's fruit eaters to swallow and then defecate, means they are no longer well adapted for current ecological conditions.

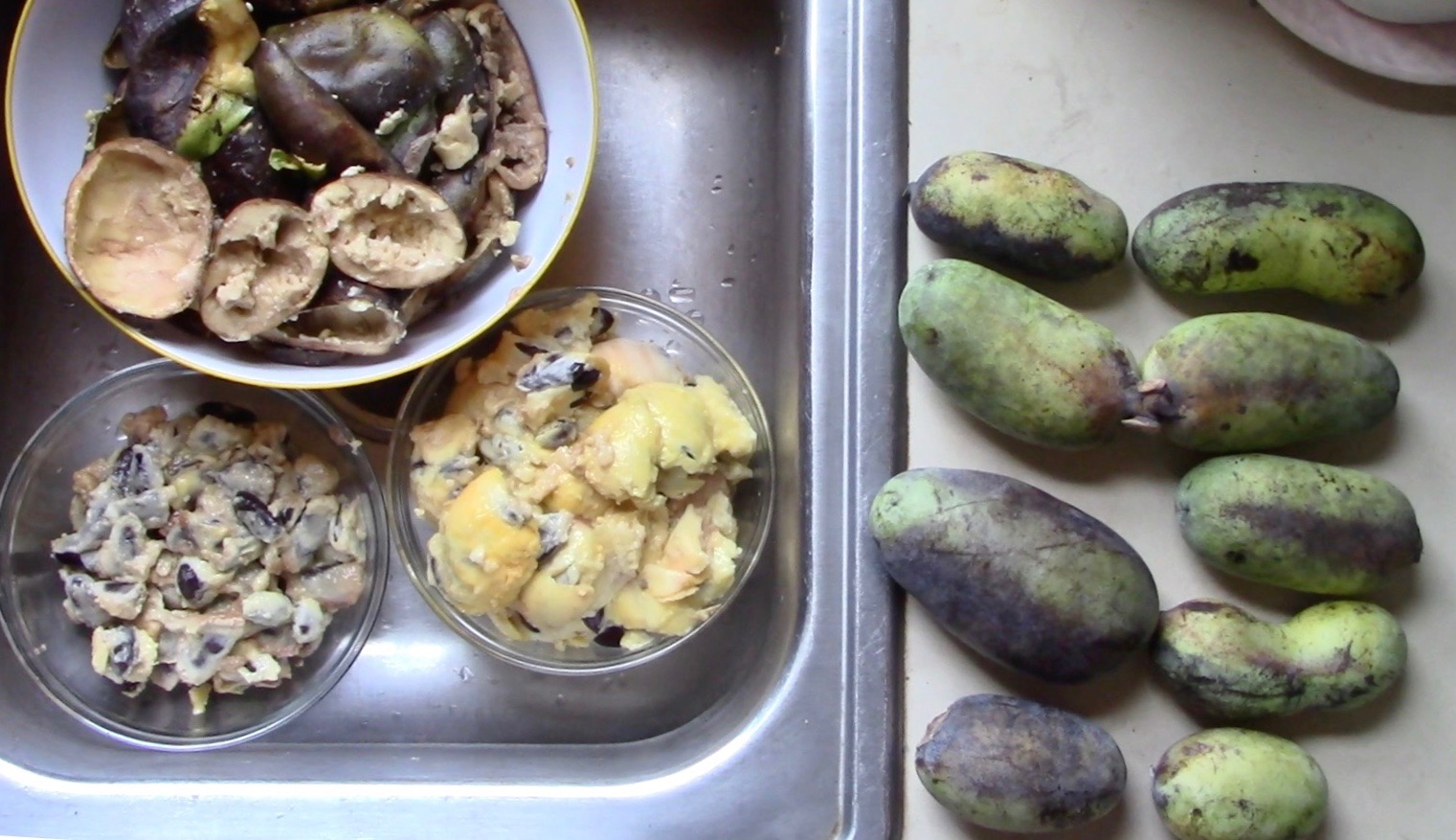
The fruit of pawpaw tends to remain green or become blotched with brown at peak ripeness.

Another indicator of dispersal adaptation for megafauna is that pawpaw fruit (wild types and most cultivars) tend to remain green or become blotched with brown when at peak ripeness. Mammals (other than primates) rely on olfactory rather than visual clues for discerning ripe fruit, so fruit color is no signal of ripeness for large mammals. An advantage of maintaining green fruit skin throughout the ripening process is that photosynthesis can continue during this time.

Following the extinction of much of the ice age megafauna, bears would have continued dispersing pawpaw seeds in their dung. Hand carrying of fruit and seeds by humans expanding from Asia into North America would have extended the range of long-distance seed dispersal. Humans intentionally continue this role today via horticultural plantings, along with wild plantings as far north as Massachusetts, Pennsylvania, and Michigan. Small mammals, including raccoons, gray foxes, opossums, and squirrels, assist in local movements of seeds.

=== Interactions with animals ===
Pawpaw defends against herbivory by producing strong-smelling natural toxins known as acetogenins. Pawpaw leaves, twigs, and bark are therefore seldom consumed by rabbits, deer, or goats, nor by insects. However, the larva of the Pawpaw sphinx moth feeds on pawpaw leaves and mules have been seen eating the leaves in Maryland. The fruit pulp is readily consumed by mammals, including opossums, foxes, squirrels and raccoons.

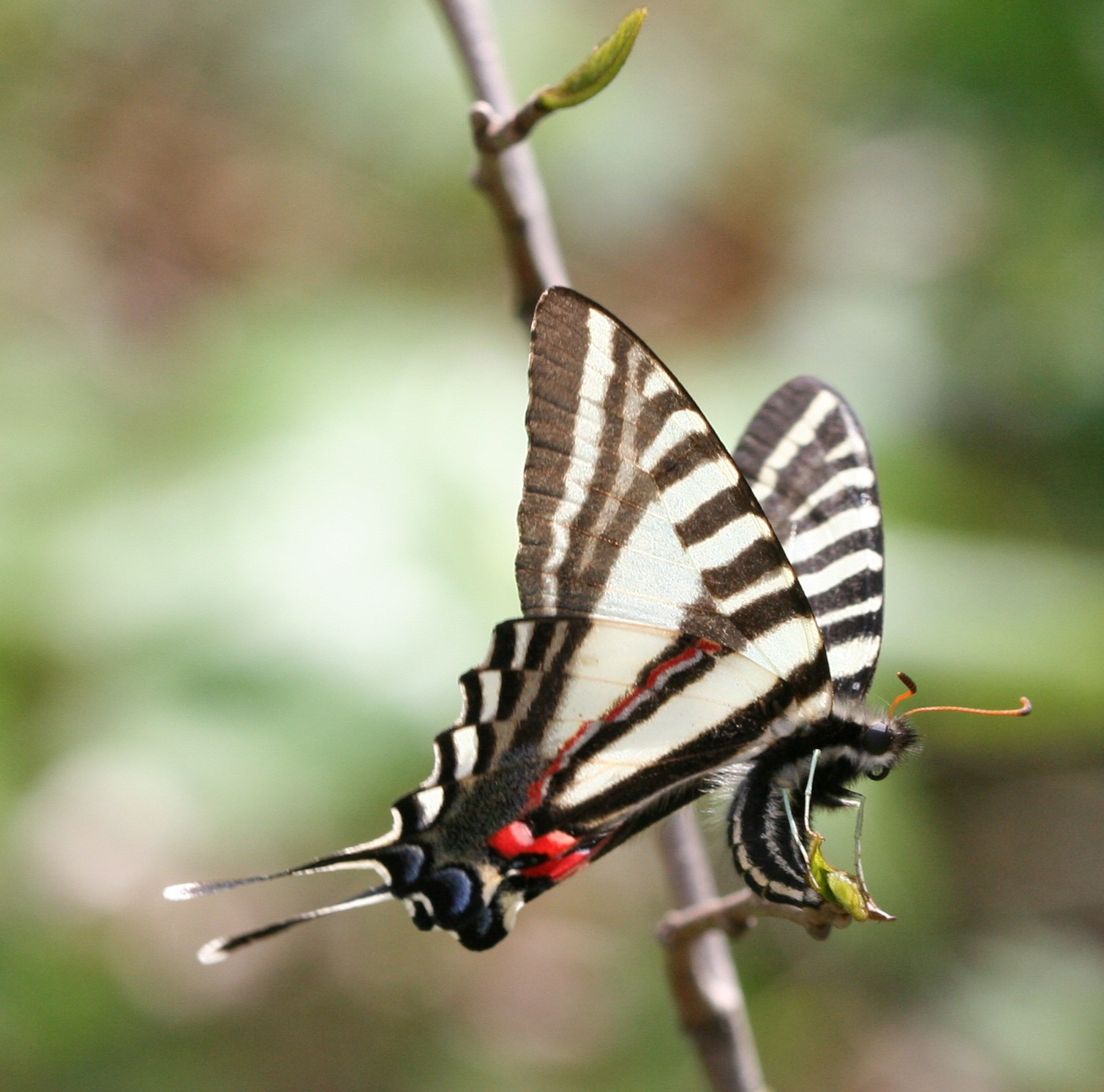
A female zebra swallowtail (Eurytides marcellus) laying an egg on an emerging pawpaw leaf. Young pawpaw leaves are preferred for oviposition.

Larvae of the zebra swallowtail (Eurytides marcellus), a butterfly, feed exclusively on young leaves of A. triloba and various other pawpaw (Asimina) species, but do not occur in great numbers on the plants. Chemicals consumed by the caterpillars confer protection throughout the butterflies' lives, as trace amounts of acetogenins remain present, making them unpalatable to birds and other predators. A partially citizen-led project in Pittsburgh, Pennsylvania is working on restoring pawpaw for the purpose of encouraging return of the zebra swallowtail as well as the general restoration of riparian areas.

In June 2024 a zebra swallowtail was documented laying eggs on a backyard pawpaw plant in Pittsburgh. This was the first time that this butterfly species was seen there since industrialization and river slope destruction had decimated its plant host. A local news editorial wrote, "The return of the zebra swallowtail, after 87 years, is a huge success for naturalists, conservationists and native tree lovers.... Organizations like Grow Pittsburgh, Tree Pittsburgh, the Pittsburgh Parks Conservancy and dedicated chat groups for Pittsburgh conservationists made the zebra swallowtail butterfly's restoration possible."

Other insects that have evolved the ability to consume pawpaws include Talponia plummeriana, the pawpaw peduncle borer, whose larvae can be found in flowers, and Omphalocera munroei, the asimina webworm, whose larvae mostly feed upon leaves. Drosophila suzukii, the spotted wing drosophila, and Zaprionus indianus, the African fig fly, have been recorded developing within pawpaw fruit collected in Connecticut, United States, marking the first known use of a member of the Annonaceae family by D. suzukii and an expansion of the known host range of Z. indianus.

=== Patch-forming clonal growth ===
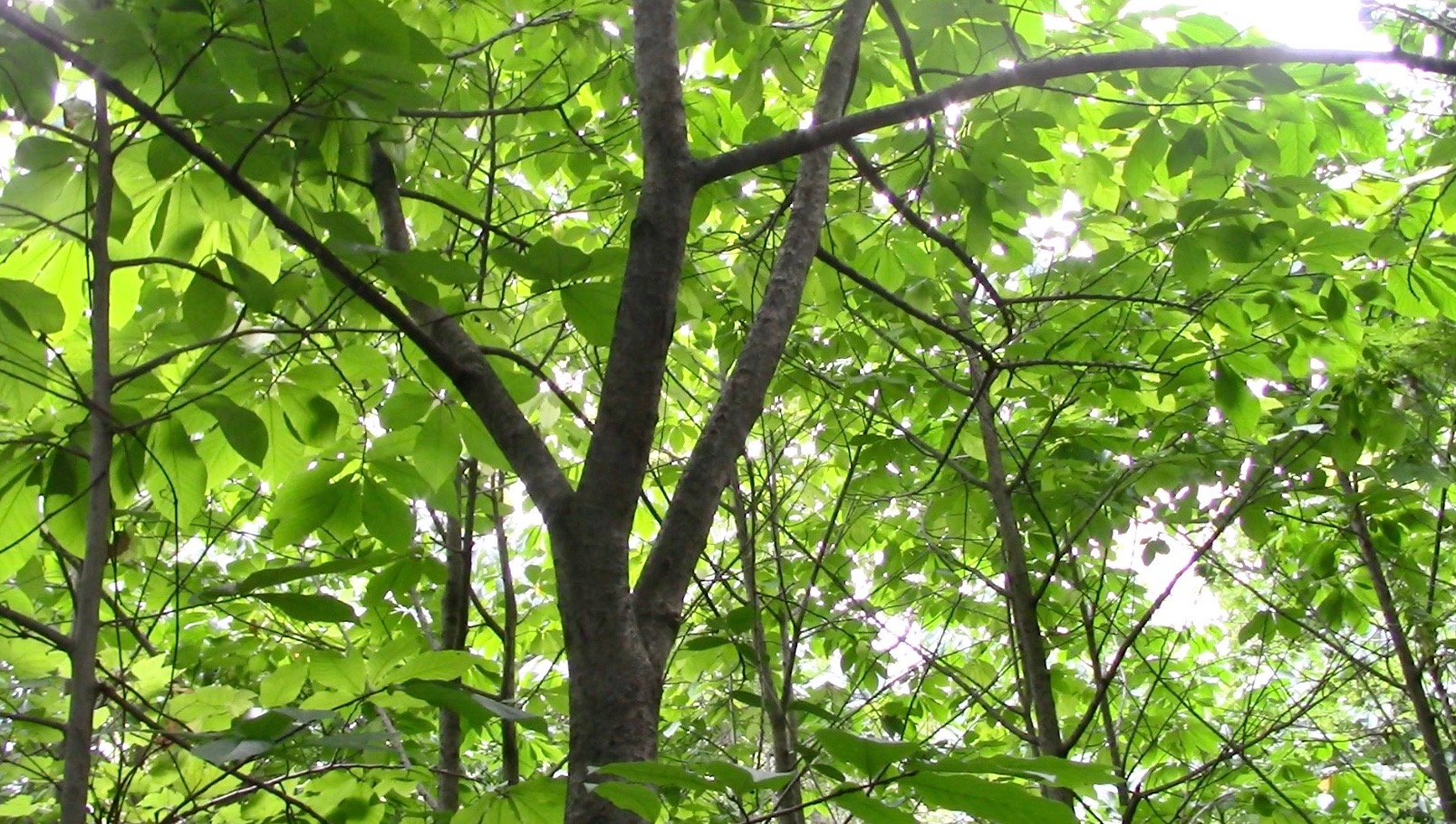
All the stems in view are part of a wild pawpaw patch in Michigan.

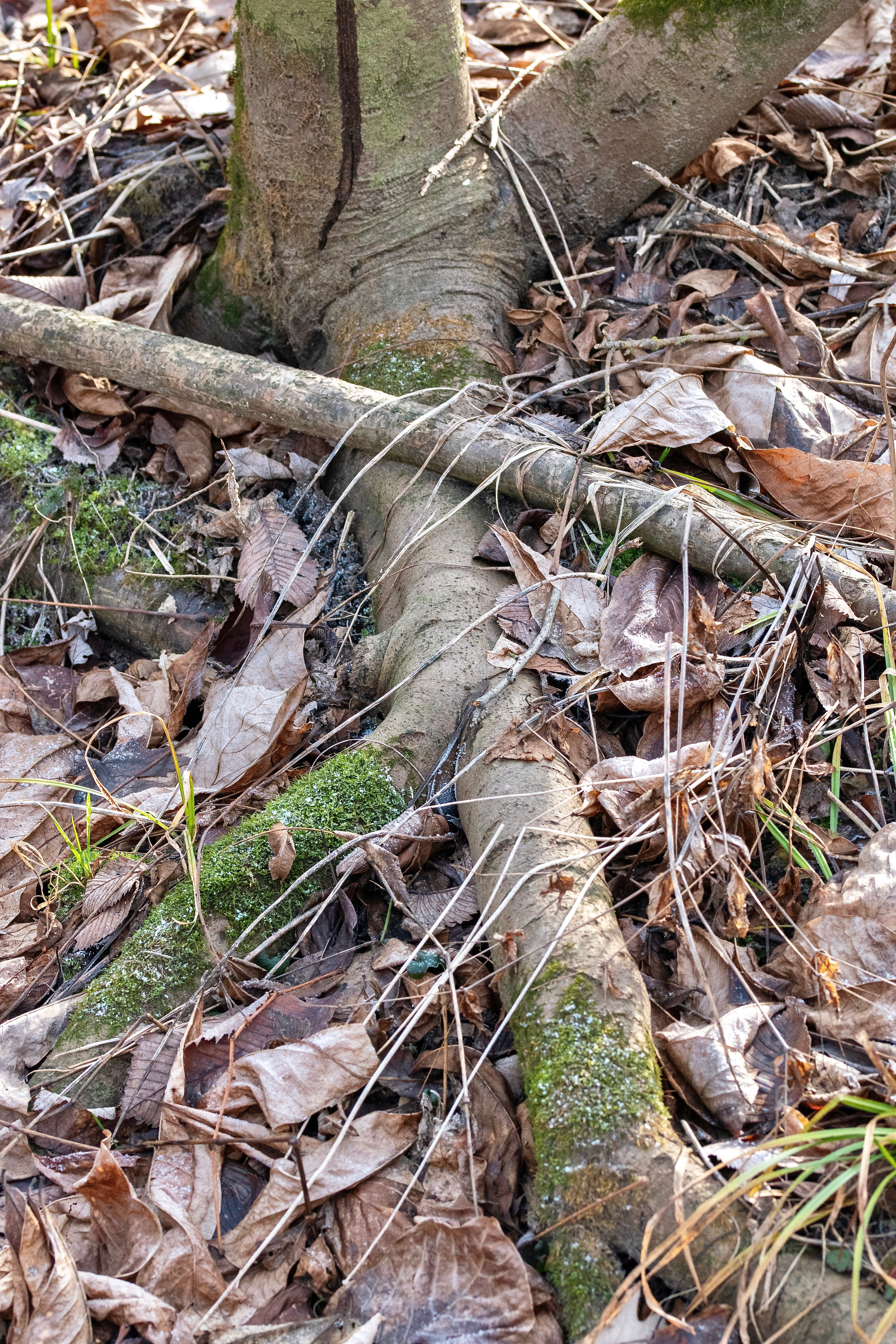
Pawpaw forms wild patches by growing shallow outward stems.

Pawpaw is well suited to life as an understory tree. Its large seed enables significant below-ground growth before the above-ground growth needs to access sunlight for photosynthesis. As well, the species is so shade-adapted that propagation of seedlings in nursery and landscape settings may fail if the emerging plants are not protected from direct sunlight.

Patch-forming clonal growth is achieved by way of shallow, horizontally spreading stems (rhizomes). By retaining these interconnections, photosynthates can be shared among the stems (ramets). Stems that access sunlight can grow as tall as 30 feet and will bear the most fruit. Stems that develop under canopy shade tend to curve and bend in quest of sunlight patches, with a greater density of small stems than where the tallest stems have captured the canopy positions.

Pawpaws are not the first to colonize a disturbed site, but because they are capable of growing in deep shade, they can establish from seed beneath mature deciduous trees and then spread into a subcanopy patch. They may even become dominant through time by depriving native canopy trees from re-establishing via seed in a treefall gap, owing to the dense shade within a pawpaw patch. Under such circumstances, the pawpaw subcanopy becomes the forest canopy, albeit at a height half as high as the usual canopy of native trees. Accessing full sunlight, the patch is then capable of producing more fruit.

=== Shifting dynamics ===
Pawpaw is predominantly a lowland species associated with moist but well-drained soils. Recently it has been colonizing drier upland forests.

Upslope expansion has been attributed to a lessening of human-set fires within forested habitats of the eastern United States. Unlike common canopy trees such as oaks and pines, pawpaw has no resistance against ground fires. So a reduction in fires has enabled pawpaw, as well as other shade-adapted native trees (including American beech and striped maple), to become more common. As well, because toxins in the bark, twigs, and leaves of pawpaw repel herbivory, forests browsed by overpopulated deer offer pawpaw even more competitive advantages.

Pawpaw exhibits a high tolerance for intense shading, even compared with other shade-adapted species such as striped maple. Pawpaw leaves cast very heavy shade, and this chokes out seedlings and saplings of most canopy species (though not native spring herbs that benefit from the late-leafing habit of pawpaw). This helps pawpaw outcompete rival species and is a contributor to its increased abundance in forests across its range.

== Conservation ==
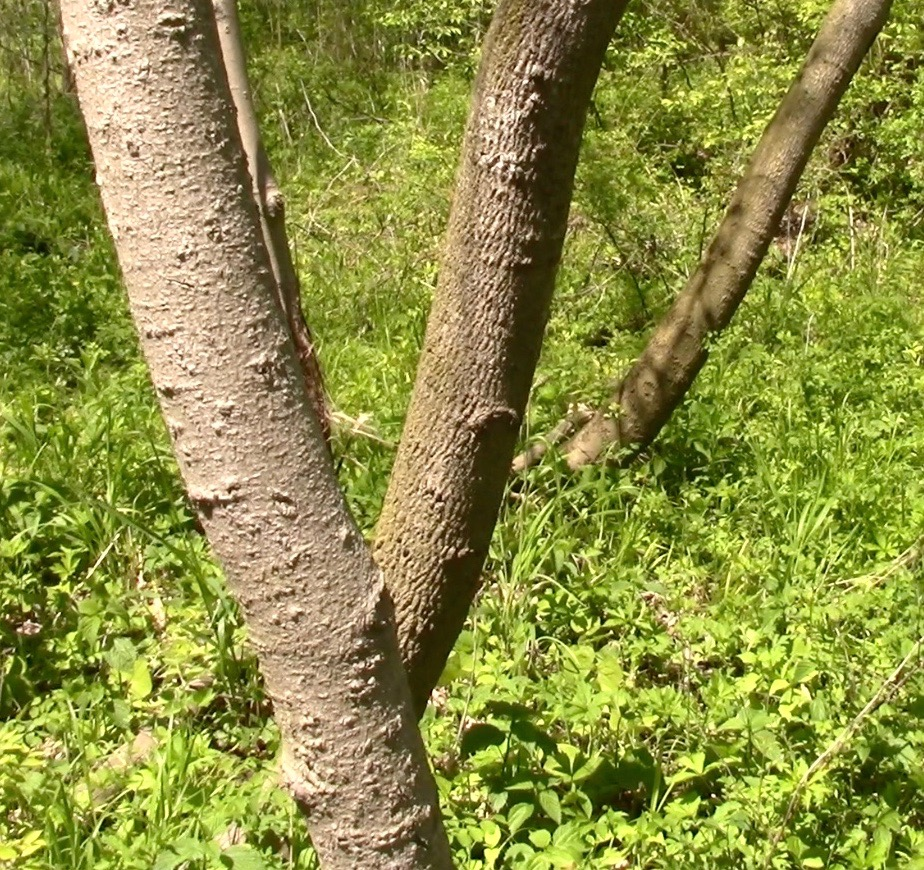
Stems of pawpaw at a wild patch in Michigan in early spring

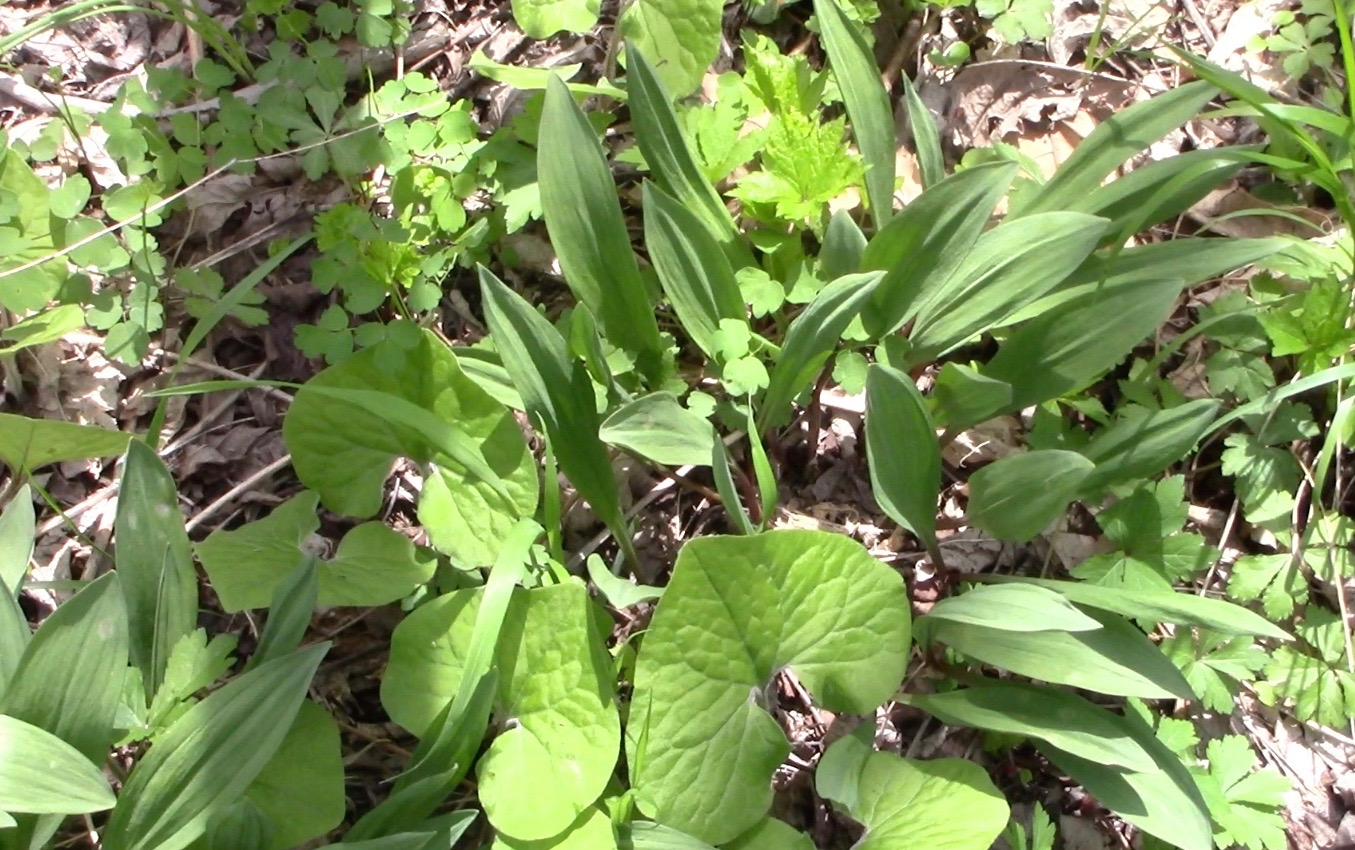
Spring herbs flourish in a wild pawpaw patch because pawpaw leaves are slow to emerge.

On a global (range-wide) scale, the common pawpaw (A. triloba) has a NatureServe global conservation rank of G5 (very common). The species is, however, listed for conservation concern in the northernmost parts of its range, owing to the happenstance of where governmental boundaries exist. In the United States, the species has an N5 (very common), but is considered a threatened species in New York, and an endangered species in New Jersey. In Canada, where the species is found only in portions of southern Ontario, it has a rank of N3 (vulnerable), and a NatureServe subnational conservation rank of S3 (vulnerable) in Ontario. The Ontario Ministry of Natural Resources has given the species a general status of "Sensitive", and its populations there are monitored.

In areas in which deer populations are dense, pawpaws appear to be becoming more abundant locally, since the deer avoid them but consume seedlings of most other woody plants.

=== Disease ===
The genus Asimina exists on only one continent, North America. This gives the pawpaw a distinct advantage in the modern world of transcontinental commerce. In contrast to North American tree genera whose ranges extend into Europe or Asia (notably, chestnut and elm), global horticultural trade is therefore unlikely to introduce diseases that could decimate pawpaw.

As for native disease, the pawpaw fares very well. There are no known disease agents (including insects) that are especially damaging. Consequently, planting of pawpaw for landscaping or fruit production requires little to no attention to disease management.

=== Habitat restoration ===
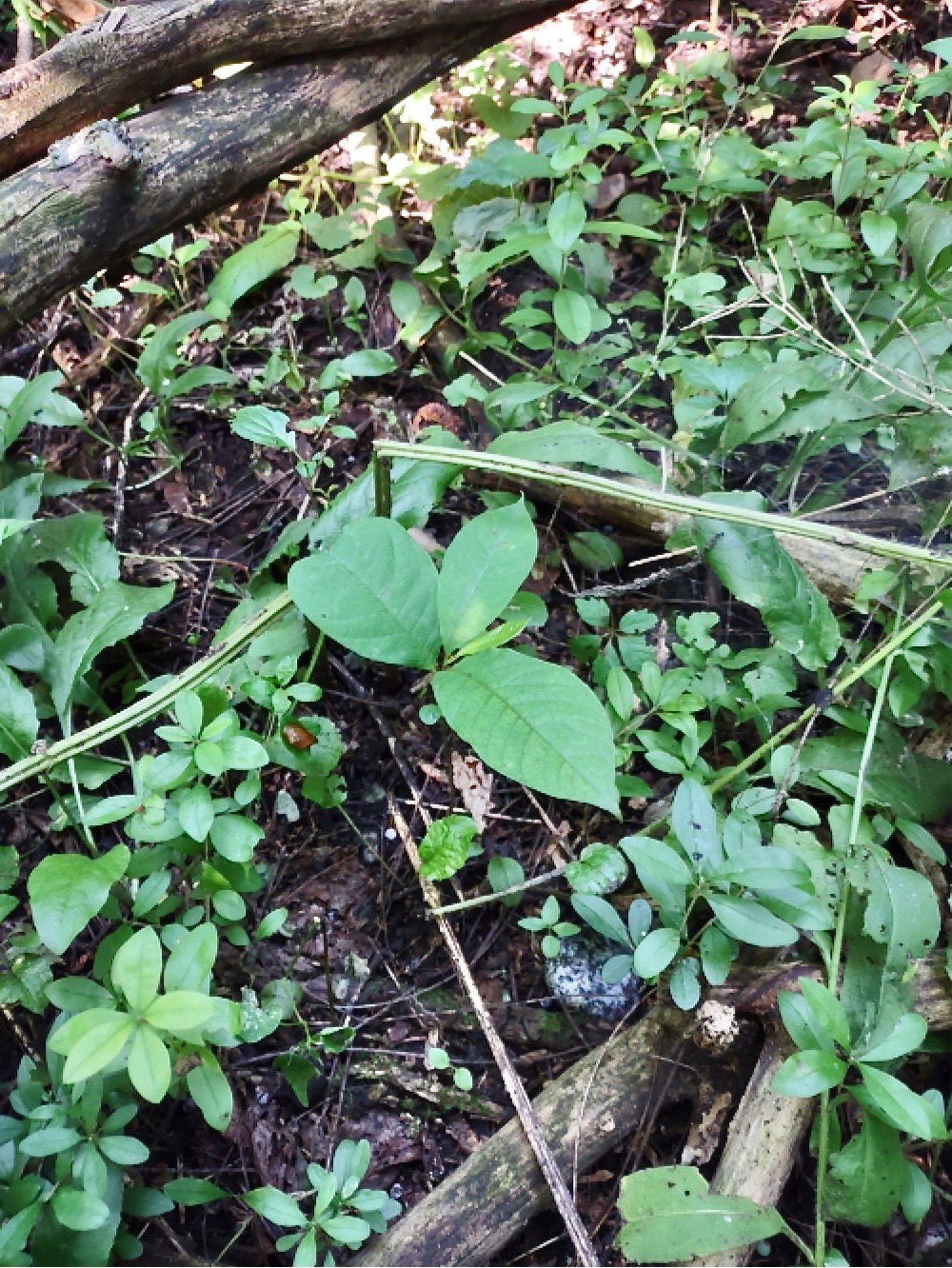
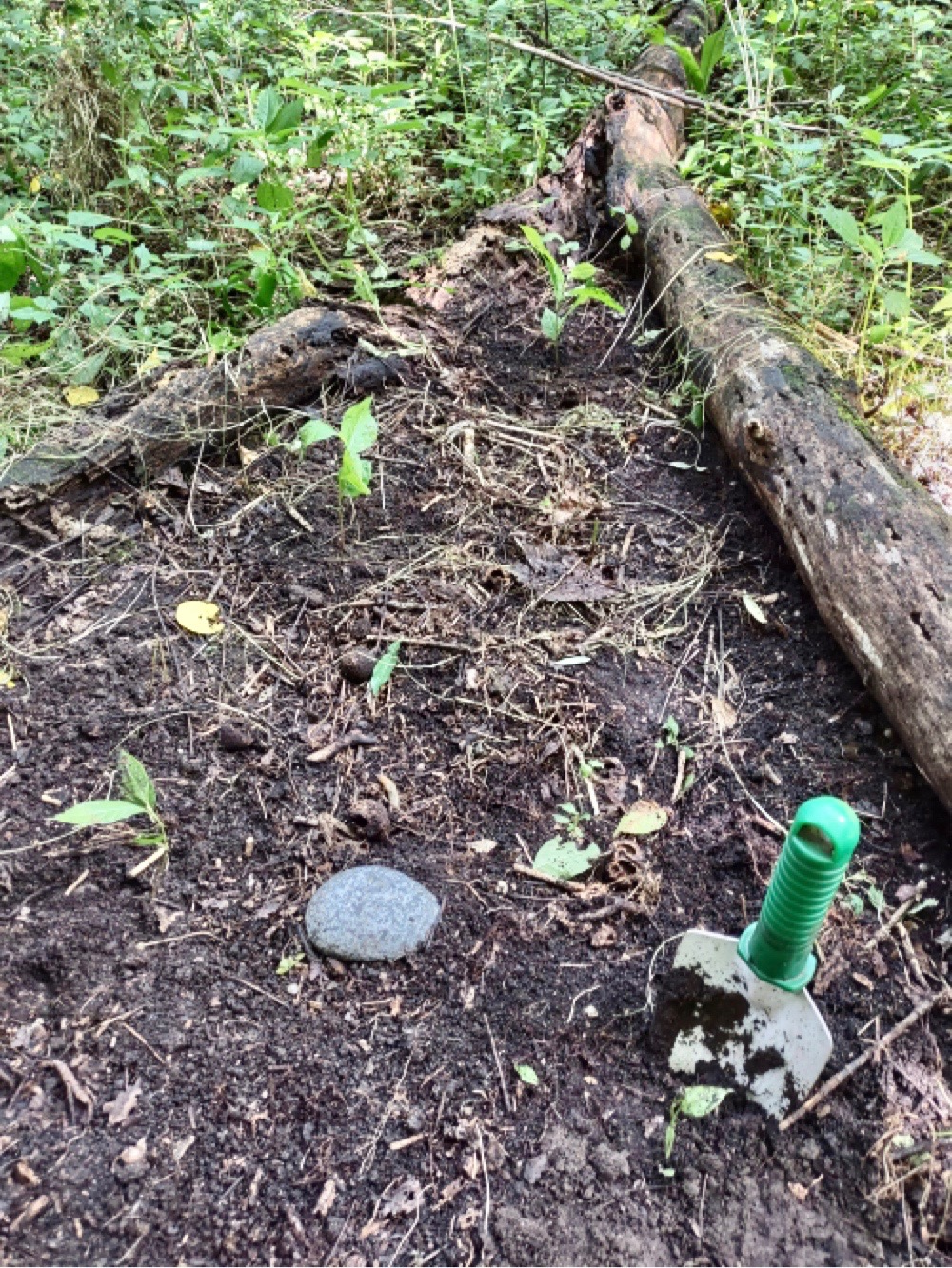
An ecological restoration project was begun in 2021 along the Huron River in Michigan. Photo left: A pawpaw seedling, July 2025, two years after germinated seeds were planted amidst existing plants (including young privet). Photo right: Summer of 2025, restoration plantings of pawpaw shifted to denser plantings of both seedlings (4 in the photo) and germinated seeds in small, weeded patches.

Pawpaw is sometimes included in ecological restoration plantings, as they have many characteristics that make them ideal for repair of riparian ecosystems. The tree's fondness of wet soil and tendency to multiply clonally to form dense and well-rooted thickets can protect against erosion and runoff.

As a native species, pawpaw can be planted on river slopes for erosion control, as introduced species formerly used in the eastern United States for this purpose (such as non-native bamboo species and Amur honeysuckle) are now discouraged or prohibited because of their invasiveness. In the two photos at right, pawpaw was chosen for post-industrial forest restoration as the ideal native competitor against the now-dominant Amur honeysuckle and increasing numbers of non-native privet in southern Michigan. For 15 years a citizen group in Pittsburgh, Pennsylvania, has been planting pawpaw for river slope restoration of forests previously injured by industries.

In the eastern United States, where large predators are nowadays almost entirely lacking, pawpaw is one of the few native subcanopy trees whose bark and leaves are too poisonous for deer to browse. It is therefore a viable species for forest understory restoration in areas where fragmented landscapes, dwellings, and parks status preclude hunting as a population control. The nonexistent commercial demand of pawpaw timber also protects trees used for ecological reasons from potential future harvest.

== Cultivation ==
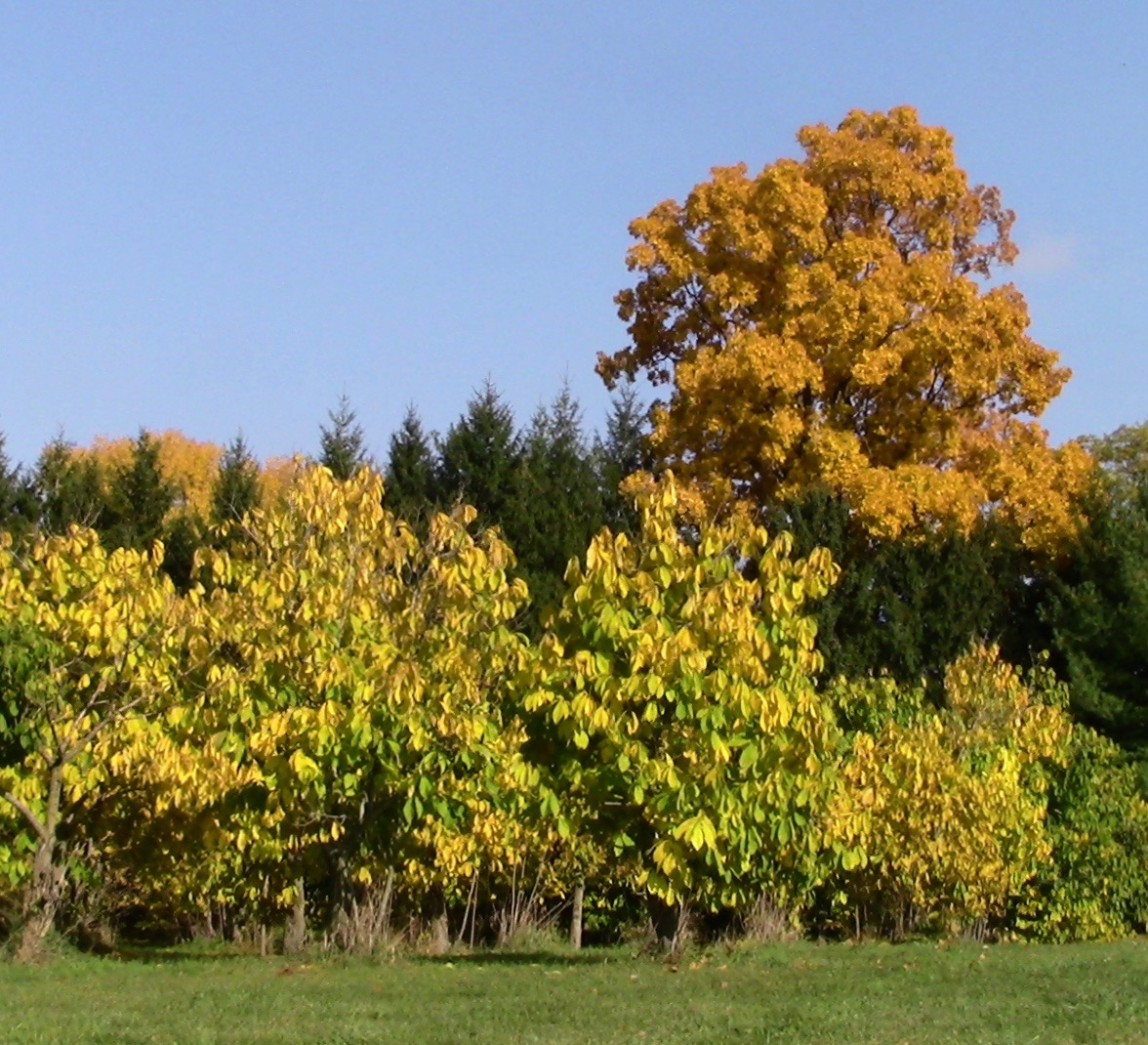
A row of pawpaw cultivars in a Michigan orchard. (A tall sugar maple and evergreen conifers in background.)

Cultivation is best in hardiness zones 5-9 and trees take 7–8 years from seedling to fruiting. Cross-pollination of at least two different genetic varieties of the plant is recommended. Until recently, research was insufficient for horticulturalists to adopt best methods for attracting insect pollinators, as effective pollinators were not then distinguished from casual insect visitors. Therefore, some growers resort to hand pollination or use pollinator attractants, such as spraying fish emulsion or hanging chicken necks or other meat near the open flowers to attract carrion-feeding beetles. A citizen science project posted in 2021 concluded that tiny beetles were the effective pollinators. (For details, see the above Pollination section).

Pawpaws have not been cultivated for their fruits on the scale of apples or peaches, primarily because pawpaw fruits ripen to the point of fermentation soon after they are picked, and only frozen fruit stores or ships well. Other methods of preservation include dehydration, production of jams or jellies, and pressure canning (using the numerical values for bananas). Methods of separating seeds from the pulp are still in the experimental phase. Mechanical methods are most efficient, but any splitting or injury of seeds can contaminate the remaining pulp with seed poisons.

Commercial pawpaw production tends to be less intensive than other fruit trees. Pawpaw requires very little pesticide/herbicide, even when planted as a monoculture. Because of its long taproot, pawpaw grows well even in drier upland plantings. Cultivation of pawpaws for fruit production has attracted interest, particularly among organic growers, as a fruit with few to no pests that can successfully be grown in its native environment without pesticides. The commercial cultivation and harvesting of pawpaws is strongest in southeastern Ohio and also being explored in Kentucky and Maryland, as well as various areas outside the species' native range, including California, the Pacific Northwest, and Massachusetts. In New York state, due to climate change's impact on traditional fruit crops, such as apples and peaches, farmers are looking to pawpaw as a new commercial crop.

Changing perspectives of the general population towards a healthier and environmentally conscious diet has led to increased interest in the pawpaw as food in recent years. Using pawpaw puree as a substitute for other sweeteners and creamers adds micronutrients such as iron and manganese while typically reducing the total sugar content as well as glycemic index of most recipes. If done correctly this will not negatively impact the quality of baked goods or desserts. In a study conducted using pawpaw puree in muffins, the pawpaw muffins were preferred in the blind taste test over the control (sugar) and other sweeteners (apple puree). Frozen pawpaw pulp is used in ice cream and smoothies, and some craft brewers use the fruit in sour beers and meads. The pawpaw is also used for landscaping due to its distinctive growth habit, the appeal of its fresh fruit, and its relatively low maintenance needs once established.

As of 2024, global weather changes have led to the loss of many American apple and peach crops due to cold weather, making pawpaw farming an increasingly favorable alternative because of its resilience to weather fluctuations.

=== Propagation ===
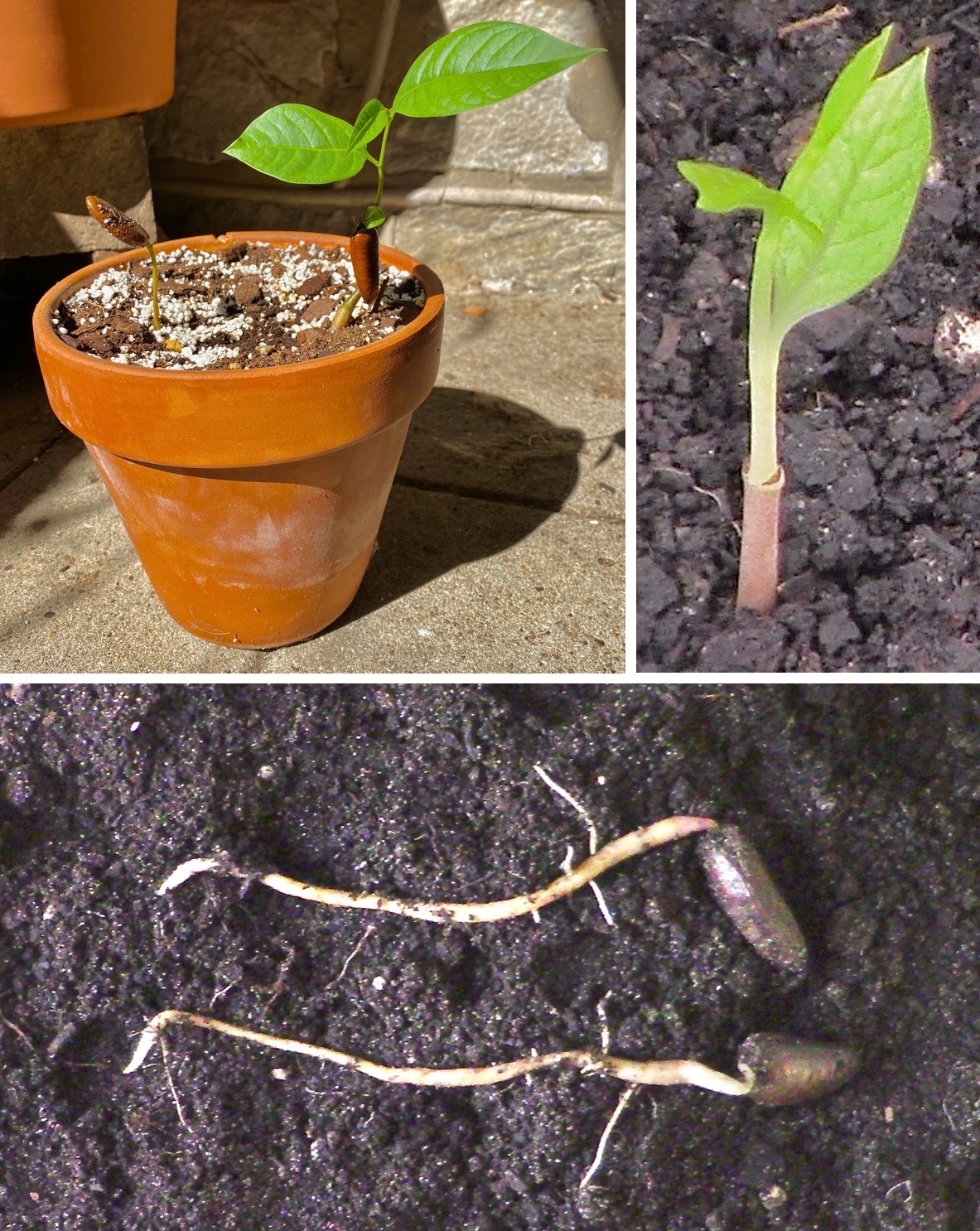
Pawpaw seeds require deep planting. Otherwise, the extending taproot will push the seed up above the soil (photo upper left).

Trees are easily grown from seed. Seeds should not be permitted to dry, as they lose viability if they dehydrate to 5% moisture. The seeds need to be stratified by moist cold storage for 60–100 days at 35–45 °F (2–7 °C) (some publications suggest 90–120 days). They will lose their viability if stored for three years or more; some seeds survive if stored for two years. Germination is hypogeal. This means that the cotyledons remain within the seed coat, acting as a food store for early growth until the plumule emerges from the soil on the epicotyl, or true stem. Because the large seeds contain enough energy to produce a long taproot prior to seeking photosynthetic opportunities above ground, the seed itself will be pushed upward and into the air if shallow planted in standard pots.

Given the 6 to 7 year maturity time and relatively poor success rates for dispersal and germination, it often requires 7 to 10 years for a sapling-to-sapling life cycle to occur for a given individual.

Propagation using cuttings has generally not been successful.

Desirable cultivars are propagated by chip budding or whip grafting onto a root stock. Pawpaw seeds do not grow "true to type" — each individual seed in a fruit is genetically different from the others and from its parent tree. Purchased cultivars do not produce seeds true to type, either, which is why cultivars are all grafted trees. Root sucker saplings, however, are all genetically identical to their host.

Commercial nurseries usually ship grafted cultivars in containers. Other nurseries, such as the Kentucky Division of Forestry, ship bareroot seedlings for reforestation projects and area homeowners.

Harvesting small stems within a wild pawpaw patch is usually unsuccessful because most are clones of (and still connected to) adjacent stems and therefore lack fully developed roots.

=== Cultivars ===
Over the years, a variety of cultivars of A. triloba have been developed or discovered, although some have been lost and are no longer available commercially. Most named cultivars derive from the northern parts of the species range.

Kentucky State University (KSU) has a pawpaw research program which seeks to develop methods and varieties to increase the viability of the pawpaw to be grown as a commercial fruit crop.

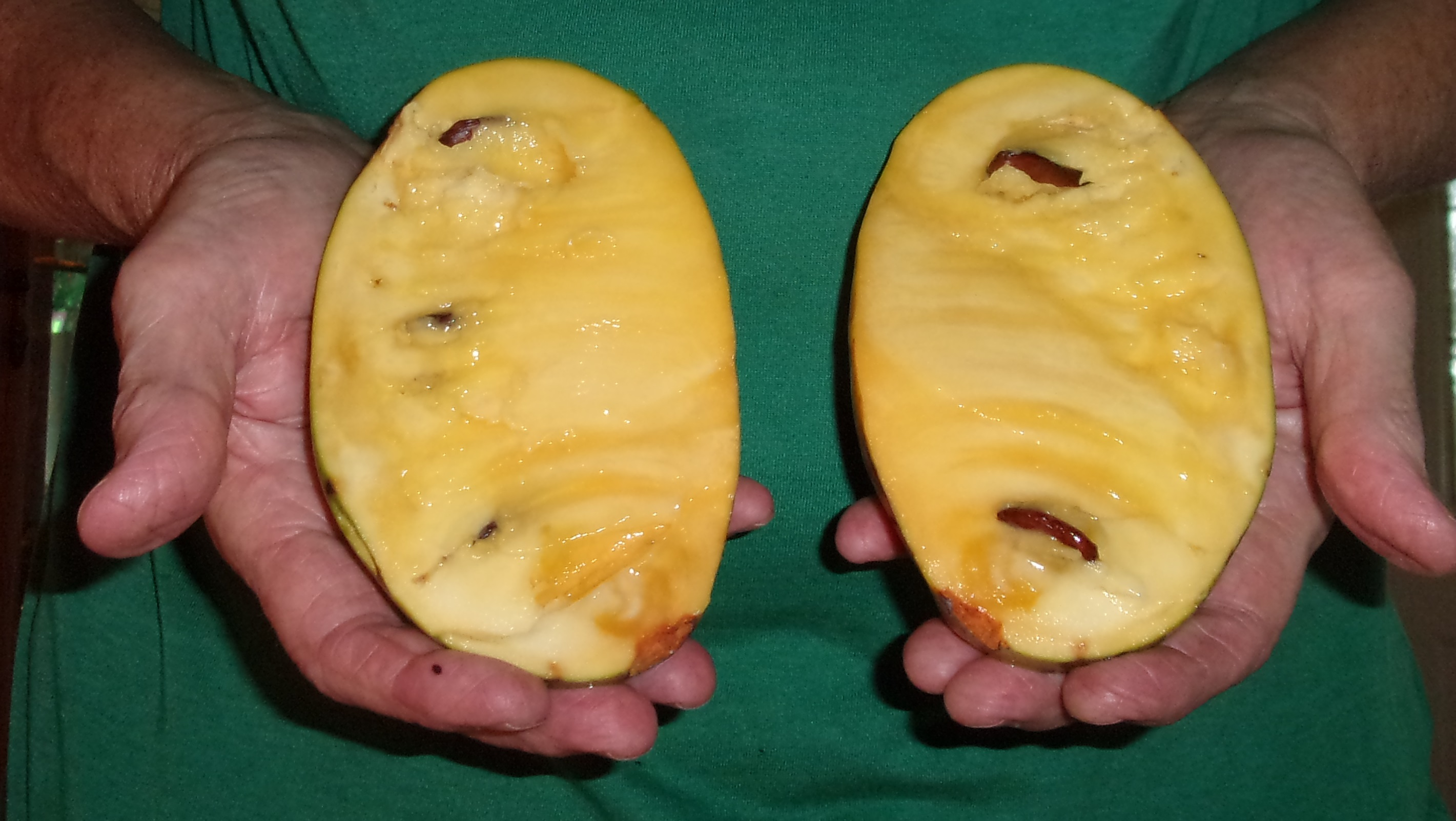
A bisected fruit of the improved "KY Legend-Titan" pawpaw cultivar.

The named varieties producing large fruit and performing well in Kentucky per KSU research trials are:

- NC-1
- Overleese
- Potomac
- Shenandoah
- Sunflower
- Susquehanna
- Wabash
- KSU-Atwood
- KSU-Benson

== Uses ==
=== Edible fruit ===
Pawpaw fruits are the second largest edible fruit indigenous to the United States, being smaller only than squash.

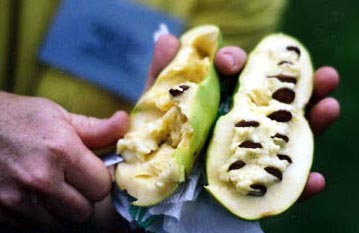
A. triloba is often called wild banana, Indiana banana, or prairie banana because of its creamy banana-like texture and flavor.

The earliest documented mention of pawpaws is in the 1541 report of the Spanish de Soto expedition, who found Native Americans east of the Mississippi River cultivating what some have identified as the pawpaw. The tree's scientific name (Asimina triloba) comes from the Powhatan word Assimina, which a Jamestown settler transcribed in 1612 as "wheat plum". The Lewis and Clark Expedition consumed pawpaws during their travels. Thomas Jefferson planted it at Monticello, his plantation in Virginia.

Historically, the pawpaw was a commonly-eaten fruit throughout its native range. With the advent of motor travel and refrigeration, it has been used less commonly to the point of obscurity in favor of other commercial fruits. Despite its very short shelf life, vulnerability to bruising, and inability to fully ripen if harvested early, pawpaw has developed a specialty market appeal in some regions of its native range, including southern Ontario.

As described by horticulturist Barbara Damrosch, the fruit of the pawpaw "looks a bit like mango, but with pale yellow, custardy, spoonable flesh and black, easy-to-remove seeds." Wild-collected pawpaw fruits ripen in late August to mid-September through most of their range, but a month later near their northward limit. They have long been a favorite treat throughout the tree's extensive native range in eastern North America, and on occasion are sold locally at farmers' markets.

Pawpaw fruits have a sweet, custard-like flavor somewhat similar to banana, mango, and cantaloupe, varying significantly by source or cultivar, with more protein than most fruits. Nineteenth-century American agronomist E. Lewis Sturtevant described pawpaws as "a natural custard, too luscious for the relish of most people." Ohio botanist William B. Werthner wrote, "The fruit ... has a tangy wild-wood flavor peculiarly its own. It is sweet, yet rather cloying to the taste and a wee bit puckery – only a boy can eat more than one at a time."

Fresh fruits of the pawpaw are commonly eaten raw, either chilled or at room temperature. However, they can be kept only 2–3 days at room temperature, or about a week if refrigerated. This short shelf-life, difficulty shipping whole, and the importance of removing the inedible skin and toxic seeds prior to processing are a primary barrier to the success of pawpaw as a commercial fruit. The easily bruised pawpaw fruits do not ship well unless frozen. Where pawpaws grow, the fruit pulp is also used locally in baked dessert recipes, with pawpaw substituted with volumetric equivalency in many banana-based recipes. The sweet and creamy fruit is commonly mixed into ice cream or blended into pancakes and other breads.

==== Nutrition ====
The pawpaw research and outreach staff at Kentucky State University maintain a detailed webpage on pawpaw nutrition. Because it is recommended that only skinless pulp is eaten, seeds and skin must be carefully removed before nutritional elements are evaluated. As of 2025, the summary paragraph on this topic is,

Pawpaws are very nutritious fruits. They are high in vitamin C, magnesium, iron, copper, and manganese. They are a good source of potassium and several essential amino acids, and they also contain significant amounts of riboflavin, niacin, calcium, phosphorus, and zinc. Pawpaws contain these nutrients in amounts that are generally about the same as or greater than those found in bananas, apples, or oranges.

==== Potential toxicity ====
The bark, twigs, leaves, and seeds of pawpaw have long been assumed to be poisonous to humans, as they are not consumed by vertebrate animals native to their range. However, some herbal concoctions have contained leaf tissue. Laboratory research isolating annonacin in pawpaw fruit led to speculation that it may be a neurotoxic factor in causing atypical parkinsonism. One study reported low concentrations (approximately 70 micrograms per gram) in frozen pulp, but it is unclear whether this difference is due to the freezing process, the cultivar used, or the fruit's stage of maturity. A 2015 study cautioned that some standard methods of isolating the known toxins also isolated isomers of those toxins, thereby inflating the toxic concentrations reported in fruit pulp. Because it is reproductively harmful for fruit skin and pulp to attract coevolved mammalian herbivores before the seeds are fully ripened, unripe fruit would be expected to include toxins or other repellents in its skin and pulp. Thus analysis of pulp nutrition and other chemicals must be restricted to fully ripe fruit.

While consumption of annonacin-containing plant products has been linked to atypical parkinsonism, the populations most at risk are those who consume large amounts of fruit products year-round from the Annonaceae family. Specifically, there is concern that the pulp of such tropical fruits "may have caused atypical parkinsonism on the Caribbean island of Guadeloupe and the Pacific islands of Guam and New Caledonia". In parallel, researchers have been probing the degree to which consumption of the roots of tropical cycad plants native to these islands may be the primary cause of neurodegenerative disease.

=== Other uses ===
The tough, fibrous inner bark of the pawpaw has traditionally been used by Native Americans and settlers in the Midwest for making ropes, fishing nets, and mats, and for stringing fish. Because the exotic emerald ash borer beetle is destroying black ash trees (Fraxinus nigra) in its native range, a basketmaker in Michigan whose ancestors traditionally used this northern species of ash has begun planting pawpaw seeds as a potential fiber replacement. The planting is occurring several hundred miles north of pawpaw's historically native range, so it is an example of assisted migration of a plant in a time of rapid climate change.

Pawpaw logs have been used for split-rail fences in Arkansas. The hard, brown, shiny lima-bean-sized seeds were sometimes carried as pocket pieces in Ohio. Due to the presence of acetogenins, the leaves, twigs, and bark of pawpaw trees can be used to make an organic insecticide.

==== Phytochemicals ====
Pawpaw pulp contains phenolic acids and flavonols, particularly epicatechins and procyanidins. Phytochemical extracts of the fruit pulp, bark, leaves, twigs, and seeds contain acetogenins, including the neurotoxin annonacin, as well as other phytochemicals.

==== Research ====
Kentucky State University (KSU) has the only full-time pawpaw research program in the world; it was started in 1990 with the aim of developing pawpaw as a new tree-fruit crop for Kentucky. Pawpaw is the largest edible native fruit in North America and has very few diseases compared to other orchard crops. KSU is the site of the USDA National Clonal Germplasm Repository for Asimina species and the pawpaw orchards at KSU contain over 1,700 trees. Research activities include germplasm collection and variety trials, and efforts are directed towards improving propagation, understanding fruit ripening and storage, and developing orchard management practices. Cultivation is best in hardiness zones 5-9 and trees take 7–8 years from seedling to fruiting. KSU has created the three cultivars KSU-'Atwood', KSU-'Benson', and KSU-'Chappell', with foci on better flavors, higher yields, vigorous plants, and low seed-to-pulp ratios.

== In culture ==
Legend has it that chilled pawpaw fruit was a favorite dessert of George Washington.

=== Common names ===
The common name of this species is variously spelled pawpaw, paw paw, paw-paw, and papaw. It probably derives from the Spanish papaya, an American tropical and subtropical fruit (Carica papaya) sometimes also called "papaw", perhaps because of the superficial similarity of their fruits and the fact that both have very large leaves. The name pawpaw or papaw, first recorded in print in English in 1598, originally meant the giant herb Carica papaya or its fruit (as it still commonly does in many English-speaking communities, including Australia, New Zealand, and South Africa). states that:

The original "papaw" ... is Carica papaya. By 1598, English-speaking people in the Caribbean were calling these plants "pawpaws" or "papaws" ... [yet later, when English-speakers settled in] the temperate Americas, they found another tree with a similarly aromatic, sweet fruit. It reminded them of the "papaya", which had already become "papaw", so that is what they called these different plants ... By 1760, the names "papaw" and "pawpaw" were being applied to A. triloba.

Yet A. triloba has had numerous local common names, many of which compare it to a banana rather than to Carica papaya. These include wild banana, prairie banana, Indiana banana, Hoosier banana, West Virginia banana, Kansas banana, Kentucky banana, Michigan banana, Missouri banana, Appalachian banana, Ozark banana, Indian banana, banango, and the poor man's banana, as well as American custard apple, asimoya, Quaker delight, and hillbilly mango.

Several tribes of Native Americans have terms for the pawpaw such as riwahárikstikuc (Pawnee), tózhaⁿ hu (Kansa), and umbi (Choctaw).

=== Old song ===
A traditional American folk song portrays wild harvesting of pawpaws; Arty Schronce of the Georgia Department of Agriculture gives these lyrics:

Where, oh where is dear little Nellie?
Where, oh where is dear little Nellie?
Where, oh where is dear little Nellie?
Way down yonder in the pawpaw patch

Pickin' up pawpaws, puttin' 'em in your pocket
Pickin' up pawpaws, puttin' 'em in your pocket
Pickin' up pawpaws, puttin' 'em in your pocket
Way down yonder in the pawpaw patch

He notes that "picking up pawpaws" refers to gathering the ripe, fallen fruit from beneath the trees, and that the "pocket" in the song is that of an apron or similar tie-on pocket, not a modern pants or blue-jeans pocket, into which pawpaws would hardly fit. A "pawpaw patch" refers to the plant's characteristic patch-forming clonal growth habit.

=== Place names ===
The pawpaw is the basis for various place and school names in the United States, almost all using the older spelling variant "paw paw".

- The Paw Paw Tunnel on the Chesapeake and Ohio Canal in Maryland is a 3118-foot (950-m) canal tunnel completed in 1850 to bypass about 5 miles of the 6-mile-long Paw Paw Bends of the Potomac River near the town of Paw Paw, West Virginia, all ultimately named after the pawpaw tree.
- In Michigan, the Paw Paw River is named for the pawpaw trees that grew along its banks. Paw Paw Lake and Little Paw Paw Lake are both tributaries to the river. The town of Paw Paw, Michigan, is located at the junction of two branches of the Paw Paw River. The Paw Paw Railroad (1857–1887) operated a 4-mile (6.4-km) rail line between Lawton and Paw Paw, in Van Buren County, Michigan.
- The village of Paw Paw, Illinois, was named after a nearby grove of pawpaw trees.
- The community of Paw Paw, Indiana, in Miami County, and Paw Paw Township in DeKalb County and Paw Paw Township in Wabash County are all named after groves of native pawpaw trees.
- Paw Paw, Kentucky, a community in easternmost Kentucky, was named after the native fruit tree.
- The (now empty) town of Paw Paw, Missouri, was named after the trees.
- The city of Natchitoches, Louisiana derives its name from the Caddo term for “the paw paw eaters”. The Caddo term for paw paws being Nashitosh.

=== Art ===
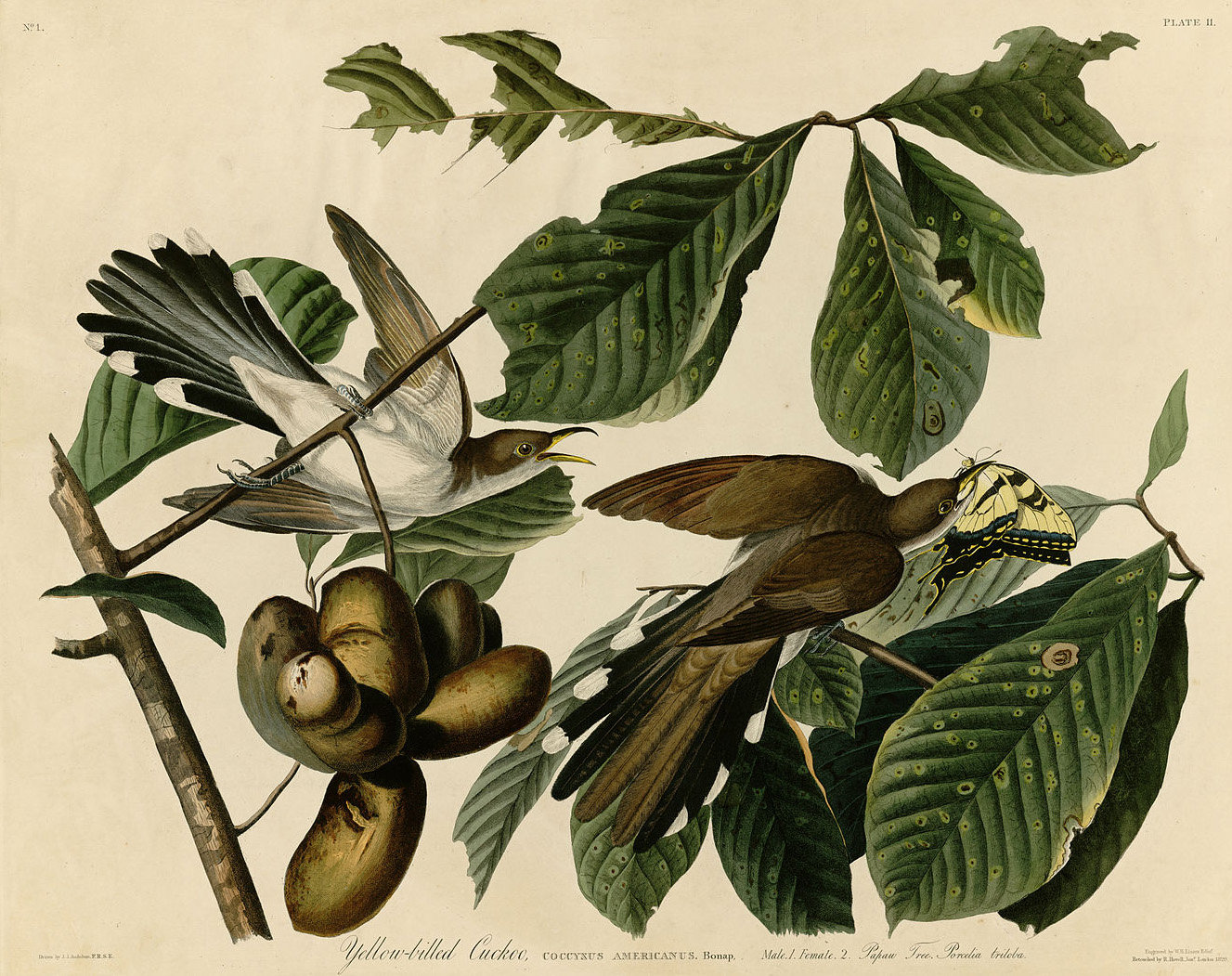
Yellow-billed cuckoo (Audubon), with a background of pawpaw foliage and fruits

- Nineteenth-century naturalist and painter John James Audubon included pawpaw foliage and fruits in the background of his illustration of the yellow-billed cuckoo (Coccyzus americanus) in his classic work, The Birds of America (1827–1838).
- Pawpaw fruits and a pawpaw leaf are featured in the painting Still Life with Pawpaws (circa 1870–1875) by Edward Edmondson, Jr. (1830–1884), at the Dayton Art Institute in Dayton, Ohio.
- A pawpaw tree is a significant element in the 2021 novel Slewfoot by Brom.

=== Other ===
- The third Thursday in September has been designated as National Pawpaw Day by the National Day Calendar. It was announced on September 19, 2019, at Kentucky State University's monthly sustainable agriculture workshop, the Third Thursday Thing.
- The pawpaw was designated as Ohio's state native fruit in 2009.
- Since 1999, the Ohio Pawpaw Growers' Association has sponsored an annual Ohio Pawpaw Festival at Lake Snowden, near Albany, Ohio.
- Since 2019, the pawpaw has been the official state fruit tree of Missouri.
- The endangered Missouri variety of French is known by outsiders and some native speakers as "Paw-Paw French."
