= Paw Paw Lake (United States) =

Paw Paw Lake or variants is the name of several lakes in the United States:

The largest and best known Paw Paw Lake is Paw Paw Lake in Berrien County, Michigan. The settlements near the lake are: Paw Paw Lake, Michigan and Little Paw Paw Lake, Michigan.

Other U.S. lakes with the name:

- Paw Paw Lake (Hillsdale County, Michigan) lake
- Paw Paw Lake (Kalamazoo County, Michigan) lake
- Paw Paw Lake (Ohio) reservoir
- Little Paw Paw Lake lake
- Lake Paw Paw, Texas, reservoir
- Papaw Lake, Louisiana, lake
- Paw-Paw Lake, Missouri, reservoir

== See also ==
- Paw Paw (disambiguation)
