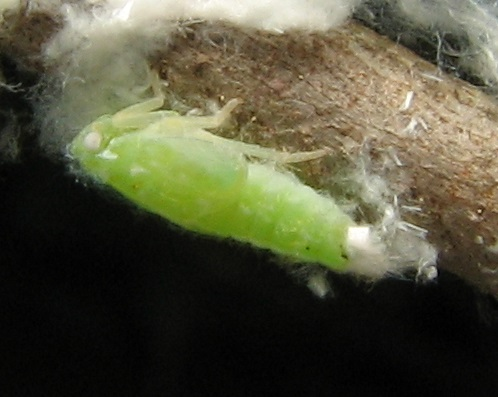
- Ormenoides venusta nymph

Scientific classification
- Domain: Eukaryota
- Kingdom: Animalia
- Phylum: Arthropoda
- Class: Insecta
- Order: Hemiptera
- Suborder: Auchenorrhyncha
- Infraorder: Fulgoromorpha
- Family: Flatidae
- Tribe: Nephesini
- Genus: Ormenoides; Melichar, 1923

= Ormenoides =

Genus of planthoppers

Ormenoides is a genus of North American flatid planthoppers in the family Flatidae. Usually adults are 7 to 7.5 mm in length and 2 mm in width.

== Species ==
These 6 species belong to the genus Ormenoides:

- Ormenoides distincta
- Ormenoides laevis
- Ormenoides pauperata
- Ormenoides pehlkei
- Ormenoides subflava
- Ormenoides venusta

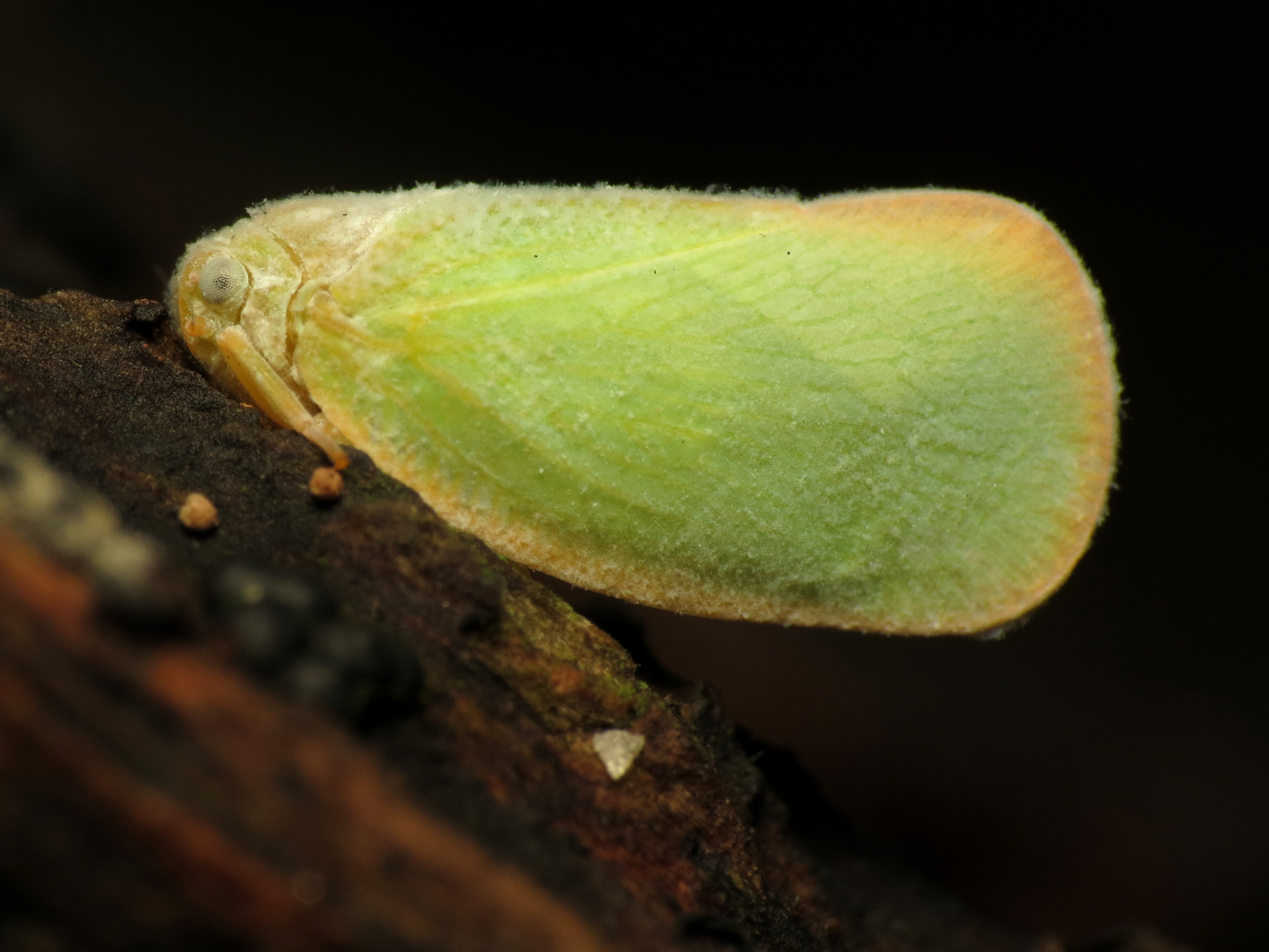
Ormenoides venusta
