= Paw Paw, Kentucky =

Unincorporated community in Kentucky, United States

Paw Paw
- Unincorporated community
- Location within the state of Kentucky Paw Paw (the United States)
- Coordinates: 37°26′15″N 82°6′38″W
- Country: United States
- State: Kentucky
- County: Pike
- Elevation: 984 ft (300 m)
- Time zone: UTC-5 (Eastern (EST))
  - Summer (DST): UTC-4 (EDT)
- ZIP codes: 41551
- GNIS feature ID: 500279

Paw Paw is an unincorporated community located in Pike County, Kentucky, United States next to the Virginia state line.

The community was named after the common pawpaw. The post office was established on October 4, 1878. Daniel B. Coleman served as the first postmaster.
