= GRANK =

GRANK, or Global Rank is a ranking of the rarity of a species, and is a useful tool in determining conservation needs. Global Ranks are derived from a consensus of various conservation data centres, natural heritage programmes, scientific experts and NatureServe.

They are based on the total number of known, extant populations worldwide, and to what degree they are threatened by destruction. Criteria also include securely protected populations, size of populations, and the ability of the species to persist.

- G1 — Critically Imperiled At very high risk of extinction or collapse due to very restricted range, very few populations or occurrences, very steep declines, very severe threats, or other factors.
- G2 — Imperiled At high risk of extinction or collapse due to restricted range, few populations or occurrences, steep declines, severe threats, or other factors.
- G3 — Vulnerable At moderate risk of extinction or collapse due to a fairly restricted range, relatively few populations or occurrences, recent and widespread declines, threats, or other factors.
- G4 — Apparently Secure At fairly low risk of extinction or collapse due to an extensive range and/or many populations or occurrences, but with possible cause for some concern as a result of local recent declines, threats, or other factors.
- G5 — Secure At very low risk or extinction or collapse due to a very extensive range, abundant populations or occurrences, and little to no concern from declines or threats.
- GH — Possibly Extinct (species) or Possibly Collapsed (ecosystems/communities) Known from only historical occurrences but still some hope of rediscovery. Examples of evidence include (1) that a species has not been documented in approximately 20–40 years despite some searching and/or some evidence of significant habitat loss or degradation; (2) that a species or ecosystem has been searched for unsuccessfully, but not thoroughly enough to presume that it is extinct or collapsed throughout its range.
- GU — Unrankable Currently unrankable due to lack of information or due to substantially conflicting information about status or trends. NOTE: Whenever possible (when the range of uncertainty is three consecutive ranks or less), a range rank (e.g., G2G3) should be used to delineate the limits (range) of uncertainty.
- GX — Presumed Extinct (species) or Presumed Collapsed (ecosystems/communities) Not located despite intensive searches and virtually no likelihood of rediscovery (species) or Collapsed throughout its range, due to loss of key dominant and characteristic taxa and/or elimination of the sites and ecological processes on which the type depends (ecosystems/communities).
- ? Denotes inexact numeric rank (i.e. G4?).
- T Denotes that the rank applies to a subspecies or variety.
