= Paw Paw High School =

Paw Paw High School may refer to:

- Paw Paw High School (Illinois)
- Paw Paw High School (Michigan)
- Paw Paw High School (West Virginia)
