= Edward Edmondson Jr. =

American painter

Edward Edmondson Jr. (1830–1883) was an American artist, active for most of his career in Dayton, Ohio.

== Selected works ==
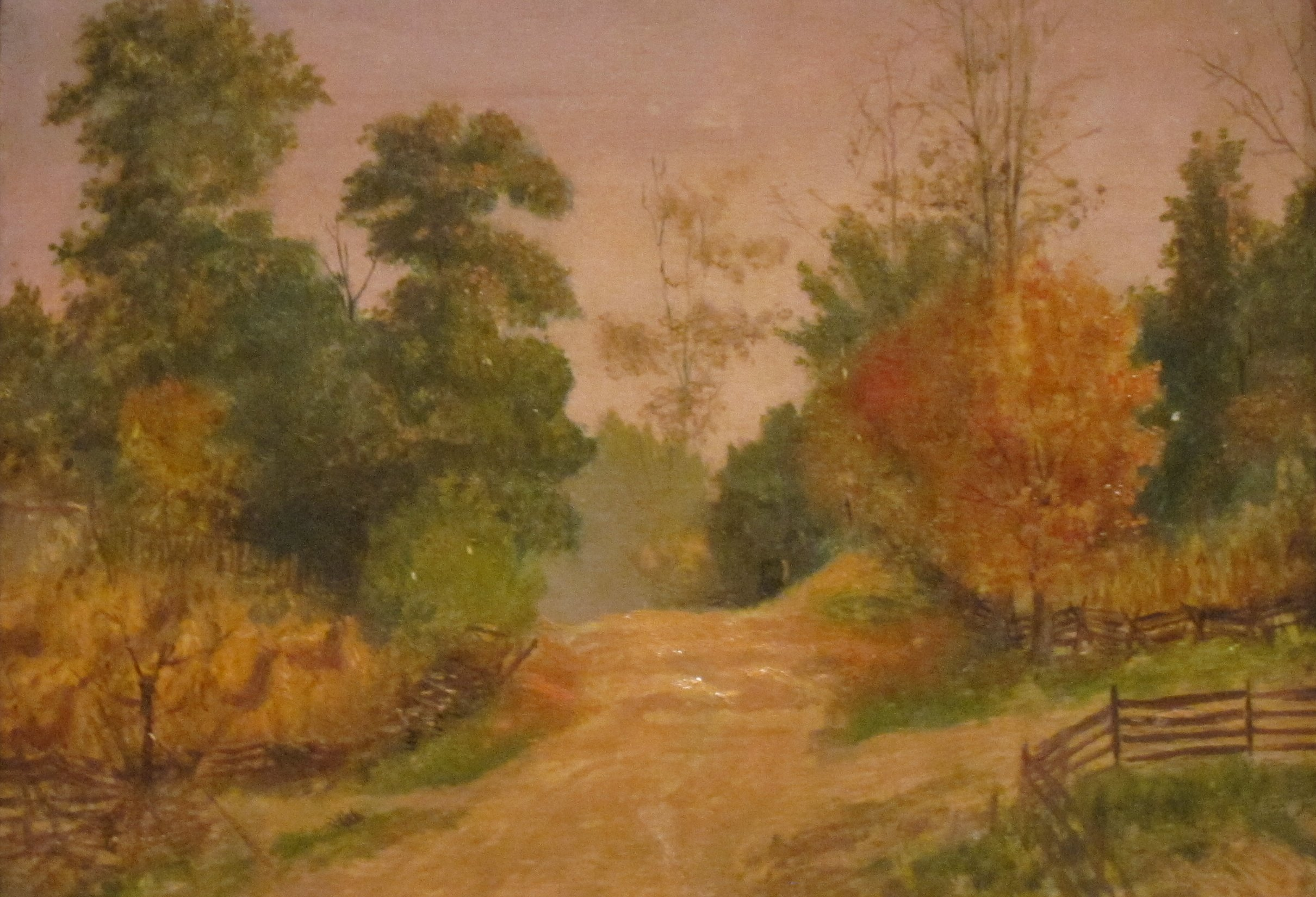
Autumn Landscape, South Main Street, Road to Kramers, c.1877-8

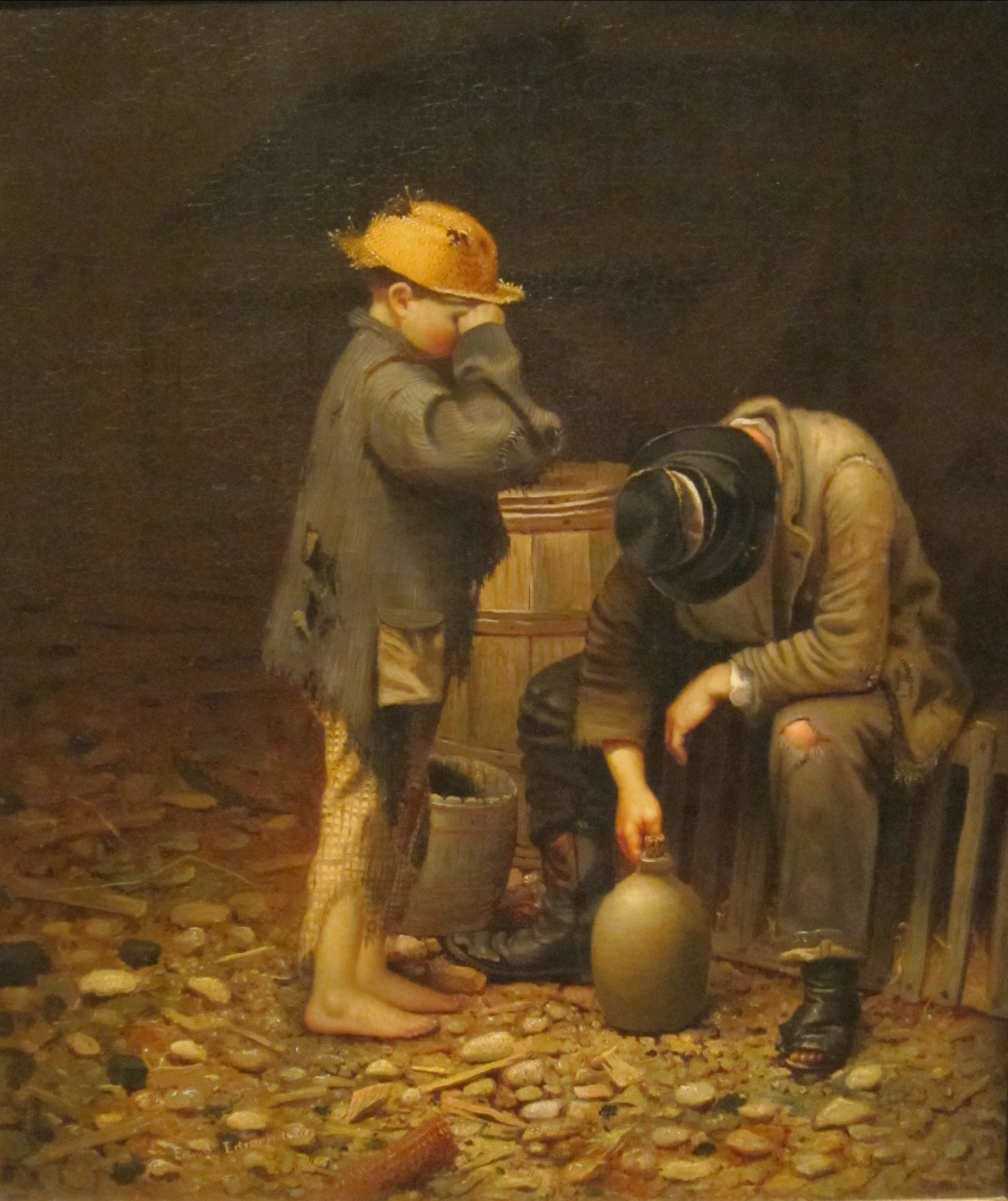
Temperance Lecture, c.1861

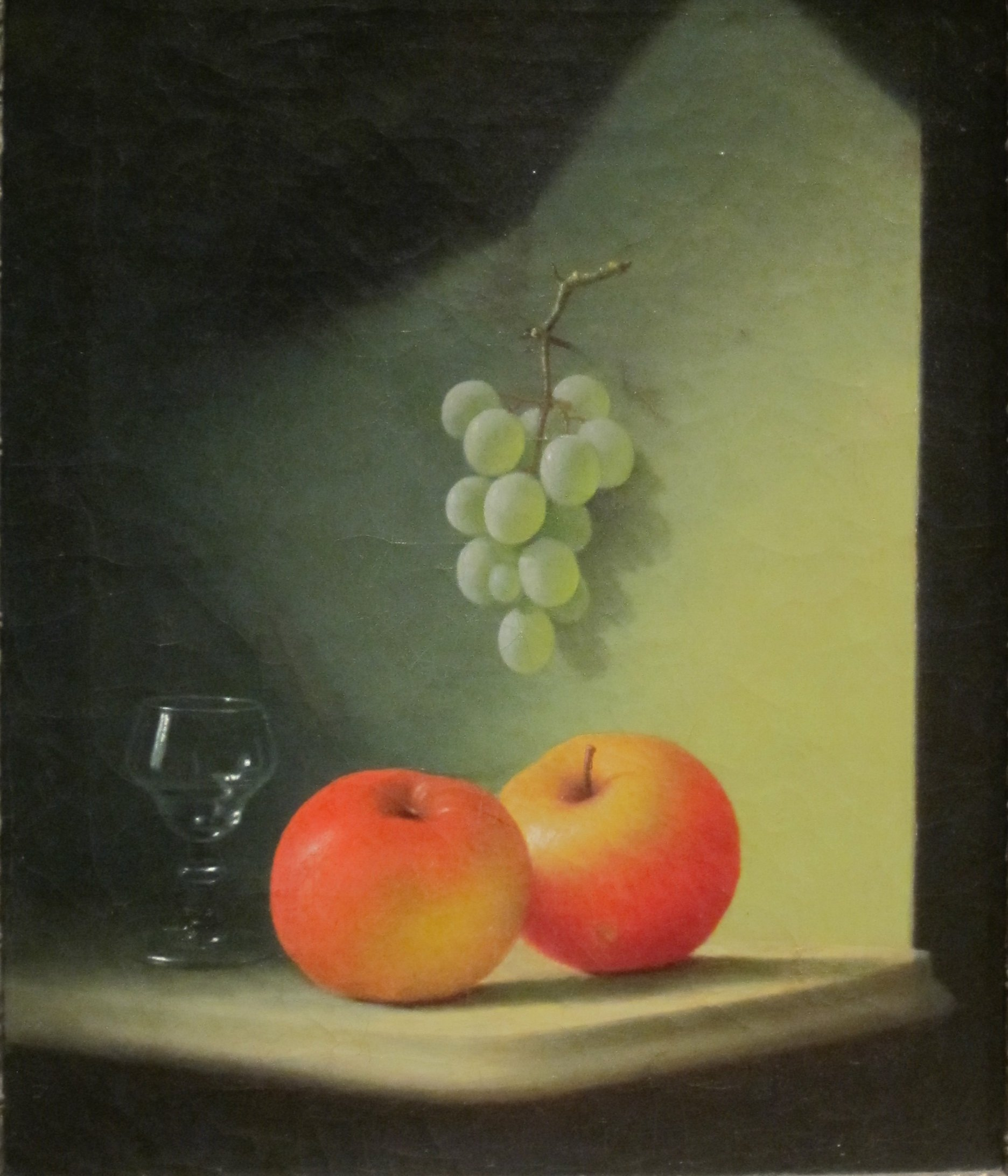
Still-life with Apples and Grapes, c 1878
