= Paw Paw, Missouri =

Extinct hamlet in Missouri, U.S.

Coordinates: 40°05′28″N 93°05′16″W

Paw Paw is a community in south central Sullivan County, in the U.S. state of Missouri, which the GNIS classifies as a populated place.

The community is located approximately one third mile north of Paw Paw Creek, approximately 7.5 miles (12.1 km) south-southeast of Milan and six miles (9.7 km) northeast of Browning.

The name was sometimes spelled "Pawpaw". A post office called Pawpaw was established in 1899 and remained in operation until 1905. The community most likely was so named because of the paw paw thickets near the original town site.
