= Chip budding =

Grafting technique

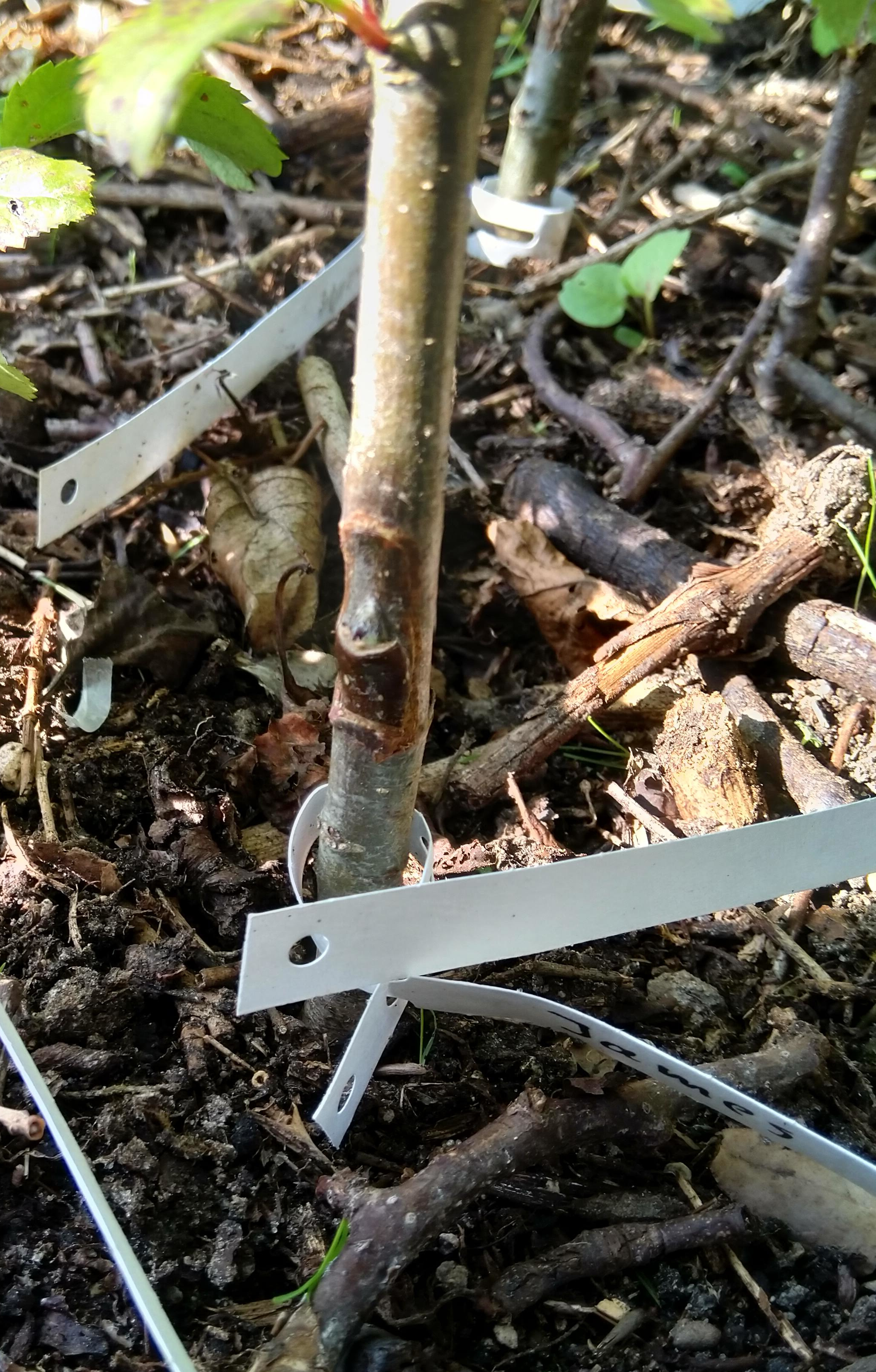
A chip bud grafting of an apple tree. The bud is grafted in the summer, and will grow a new branch next year when the tree above the new bud is cut off.

Chip budding is a grafting technique

A chip of wood containing a bud is cut out of scion with desirable properties (tasty fruit, pretty flowers, etc.). A similarly shaped chip is cut out of the rootstock, and the scion bud is placed in the cut, in such a way that the cambium layers match. The new bud is usually fixed in place using grafting tape.

Chip budding can be done in mid- to late summer, unlike most grafting which takes place in the early spring. Depending on sap flow, the bud may not begin growing until the following spring, though you can determine if the grafting succeeded before that by seeing whether the bud swells or shrivels. The next spring, all other shoots than that from the scion bud are removed, which will then become the source for the new top of the plant.

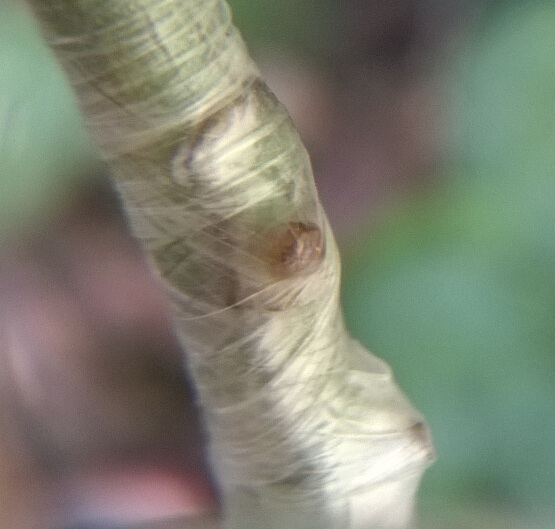
Chip budding of a rose

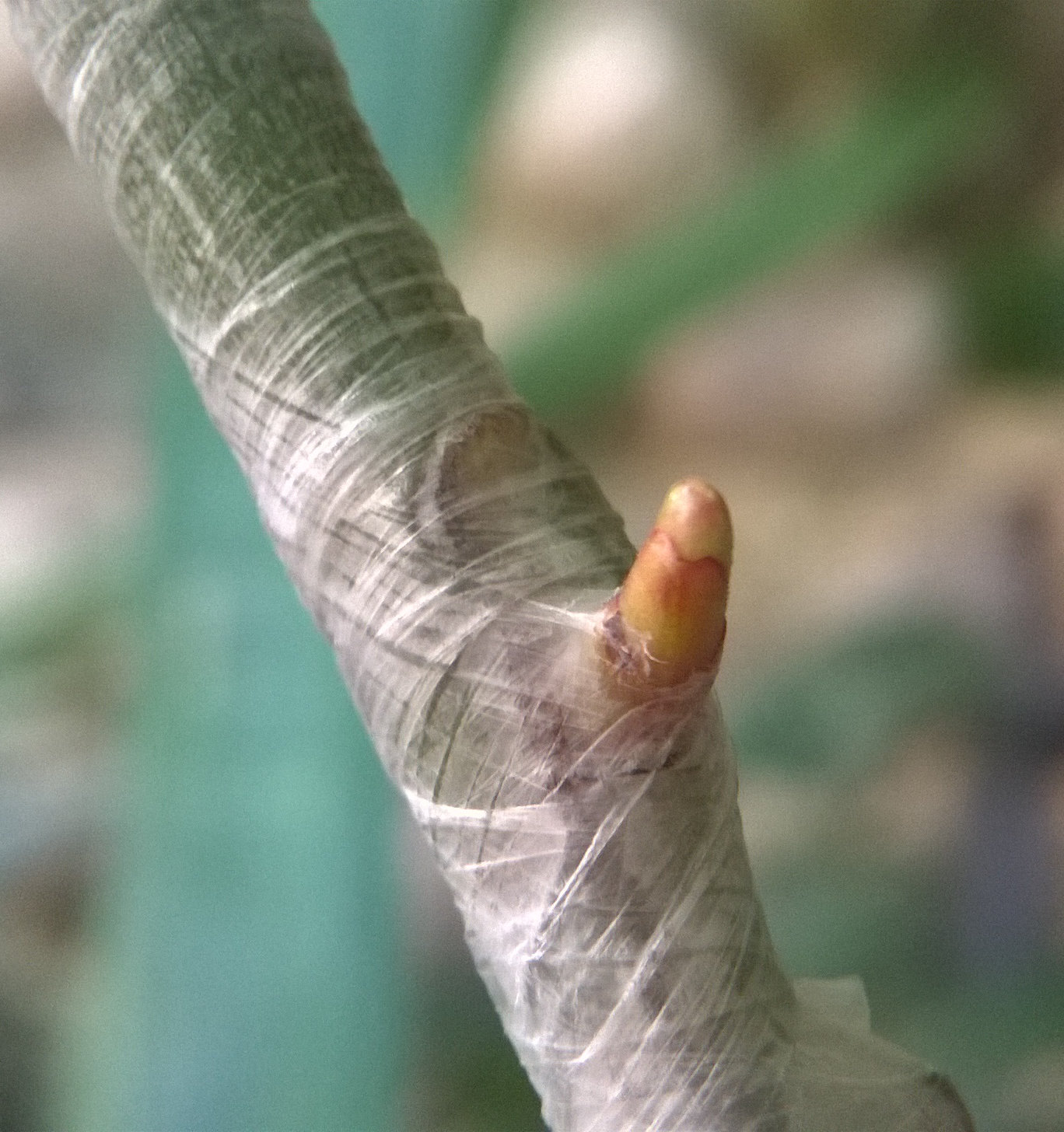
5 days later, the bud shoots through the parafilm protection

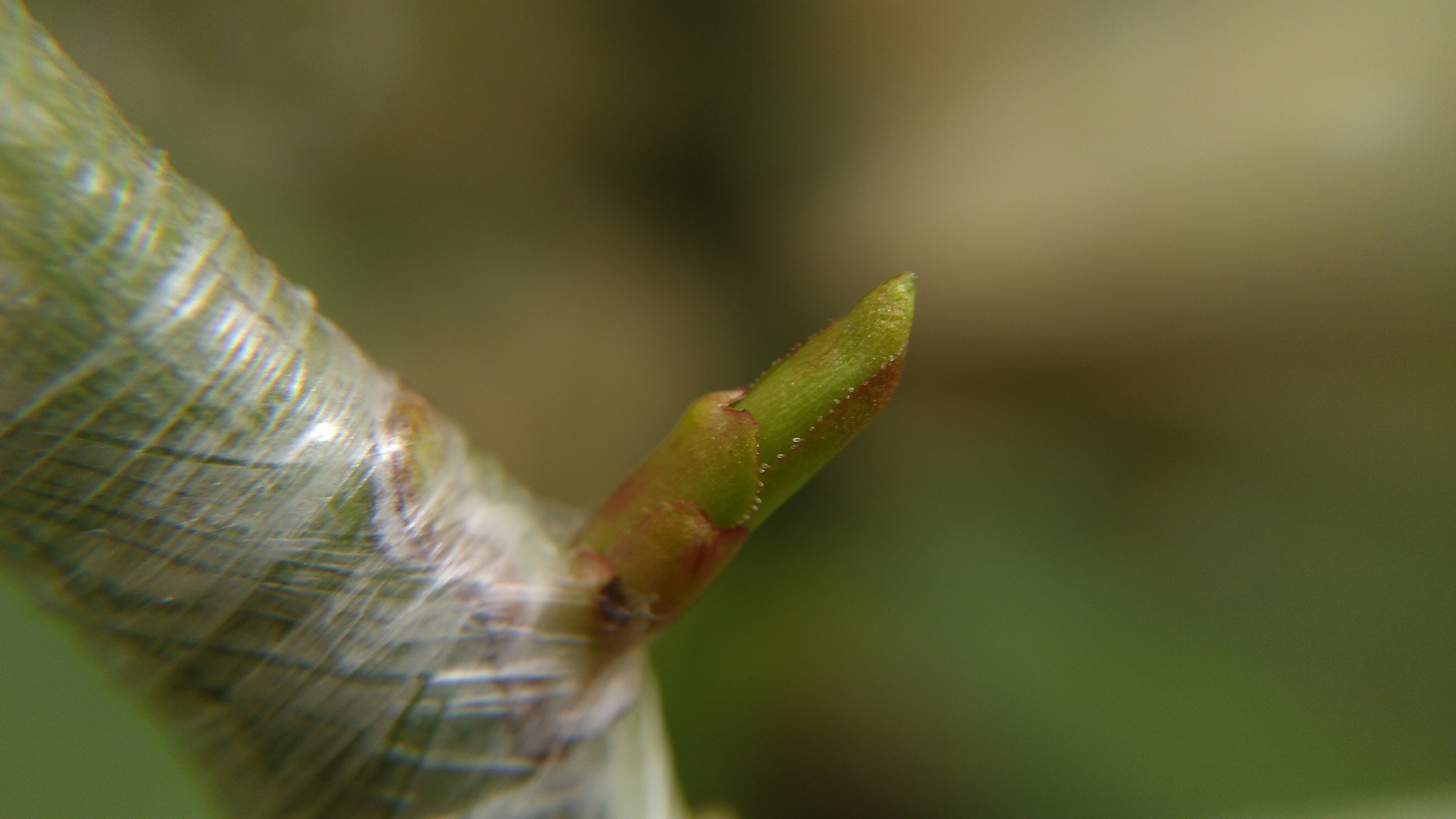
7 days later

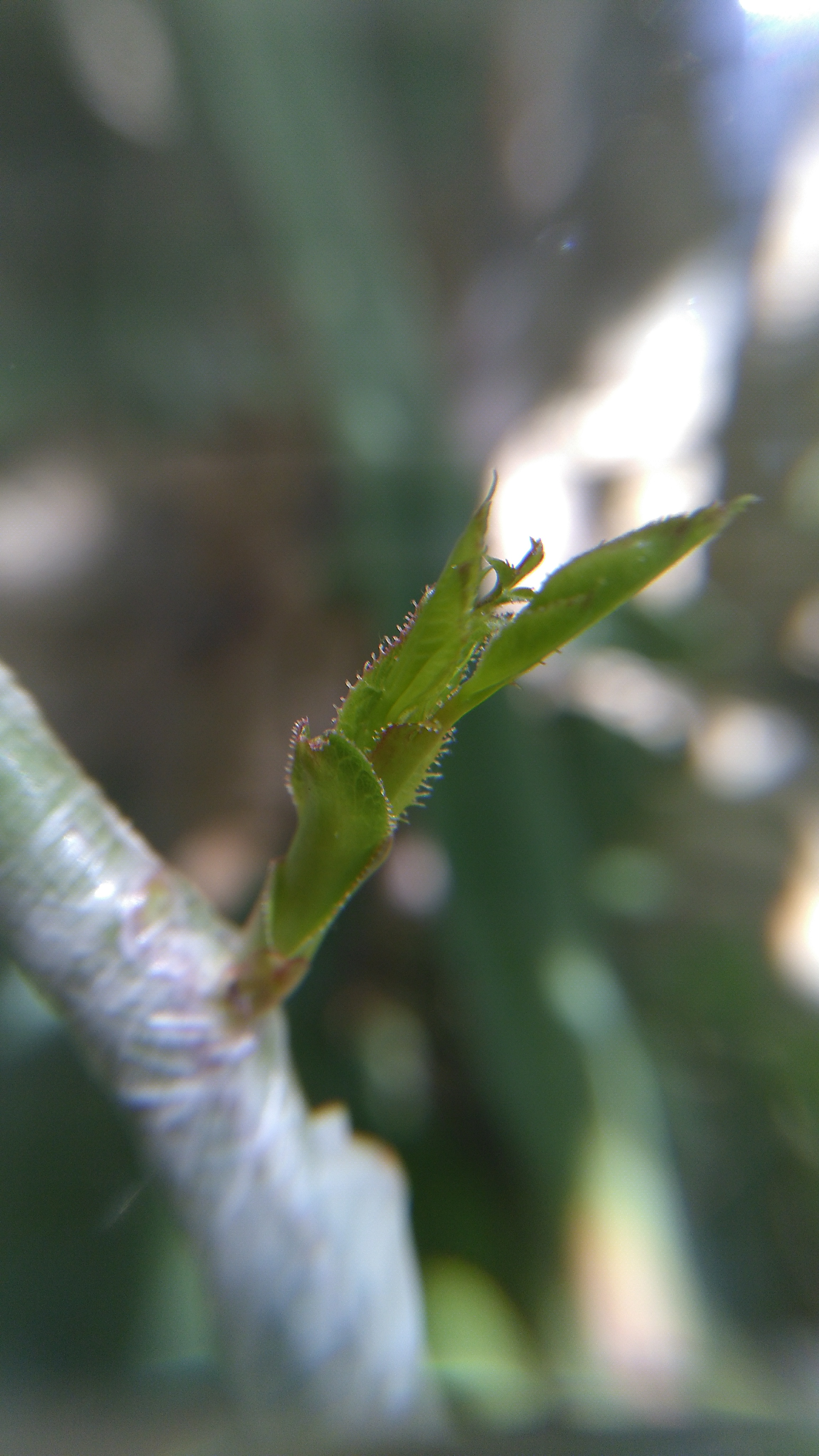
10 days later
