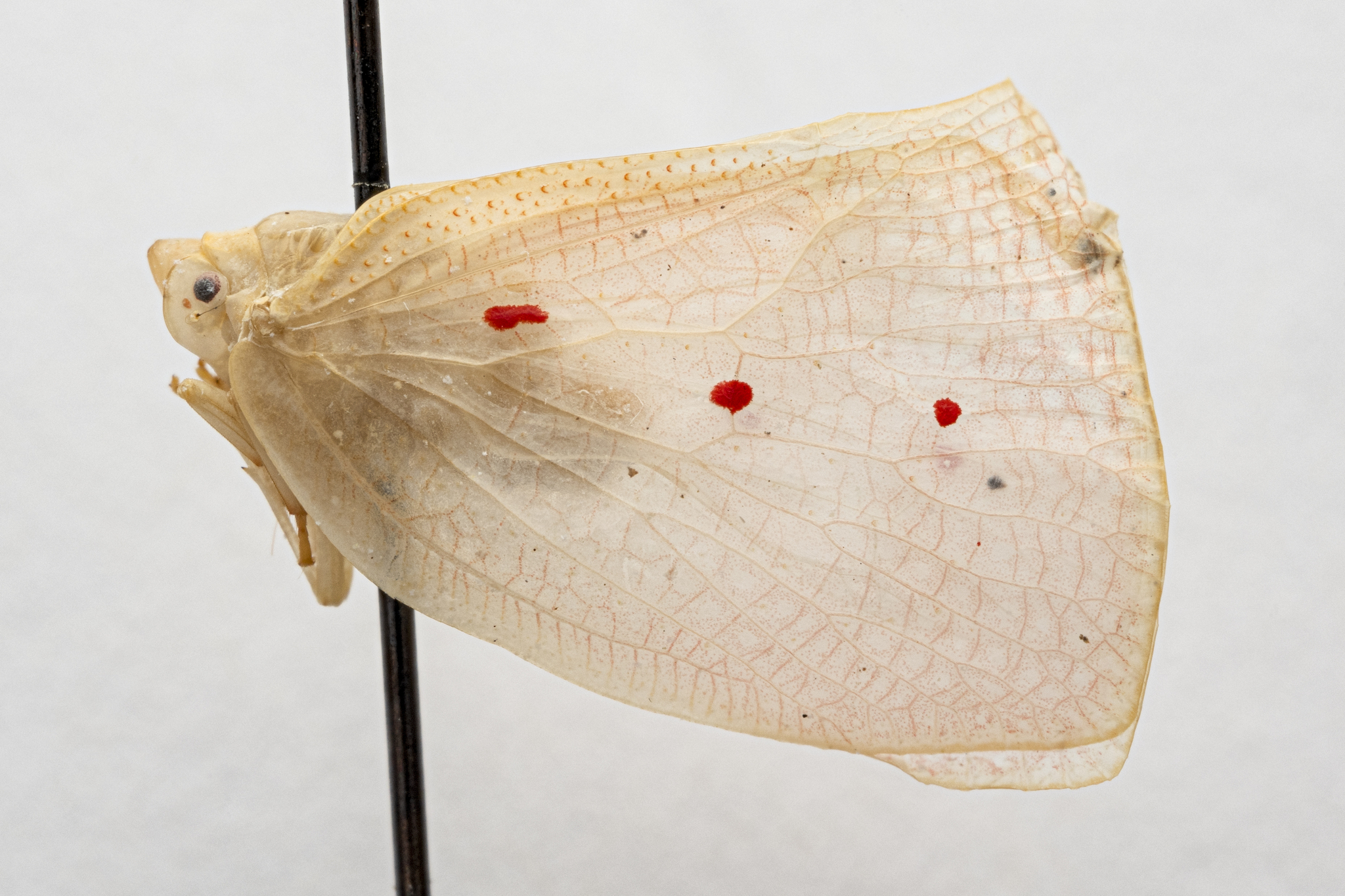
- Neocromna bistriguttata

Scientific classification
- Kingdom: Animalia
- Phylum: Arthropoda
- Class: Insecta
- Order: Hemiptera
- Suborder: Auchenorrhyncha
- Infraorder: Fulgoromorpha
- Family: Flatidae
- Subfamily: Flatinae
- Tribe: Nephesini
- Genus: Neocromna; Distant, 1910

= Neocromna =

Genus of planthoppers

Neocromna is a genus of planthoppers found in New Guinea and adjacent islands.

== Taxonomy ==
Neocromna is classified in the tribe Nephesini of the subfamily Flatinae. The genus includes two species:

- Neocromna bistriguttata (Stål, 1863)
  Synonyms:
  - Nephesa bistriguttata Stål, 1863
  - Colgar bistriguttata Melichar, 1902
  - Colgar similata Melichar, 1902
  - Colgar tripunctata Melichar, 1902
  - Phymoides rubromaculata Distant, 1910
  - Neomelicharia marginalis Metcalf, 1957
- Neocromna hastifera (Walker, 1870)
  Synonyms:
  - Colgar quadriguttata Melichar, 1902
  - Colobesthes hastifera Walker, 1870
  - Colgar hastifera (Walker, 1870)
  - Neomelicharia hastifera (Walker, 1870)
  - Phymoides atromaculatus Distant, 1910
  - Neocromna atromaculata (Distant, 1910)
  - Neodaksha atromaculatus (Distant, 1910)

== Description ==
See Medler, 2000.

== Distribution ==
Neocromna was first described from New Guinea, and the two species have both been recorded in Papua New Guinea and in the Indonesian province of Western New Guinea (Irian Jaya). N. bistriguttata has been further recorded from the Aru Islands, whilst N. hastifer is known from Misool, both close to western New Guinea.

== Bibliography ==
- Distant, W. L. (1910). "Rhynchota Malayana: Part III". Records of the Indian Museum. 5: 313–38 – via Internet Archive.
- Distant, W. L. (1914). "Report on the Rhynchota collected by the Wollaston Expedition in Dutch New Guinea". Transactions of the Zoological Society of London. 20 XI: 335–63 – via Internet Archive.
- Medler, J. T. (1986). "Types of Flatidae (Homoptera) VIII. Lectotype designations and taxonomic notes on species in the Museum of Victoria". Memoirs of the Museum of Victoria. 47 (2): 207–11. ISSN 0814-1827 – via Internet Archive.
- Medler, J. T. (1999). "Flatidae (Homoptera: Fulgoroidea) of Indonesia, exclusive of Irian Jaya". Zoologische Verhandelingen. 324. Leiden: 1–88 – via Internet Archive.
- Medler, J. T. (2000). Flatidae of New Guinea and adjacent areas (Homoptera, Fulgoroidea) (PDF). Bishop Museum Bulletin in Entomology 8. Honolulu: Bishop Museum. ISBN 1-58178-011-7. ISSN 0893-3146.
