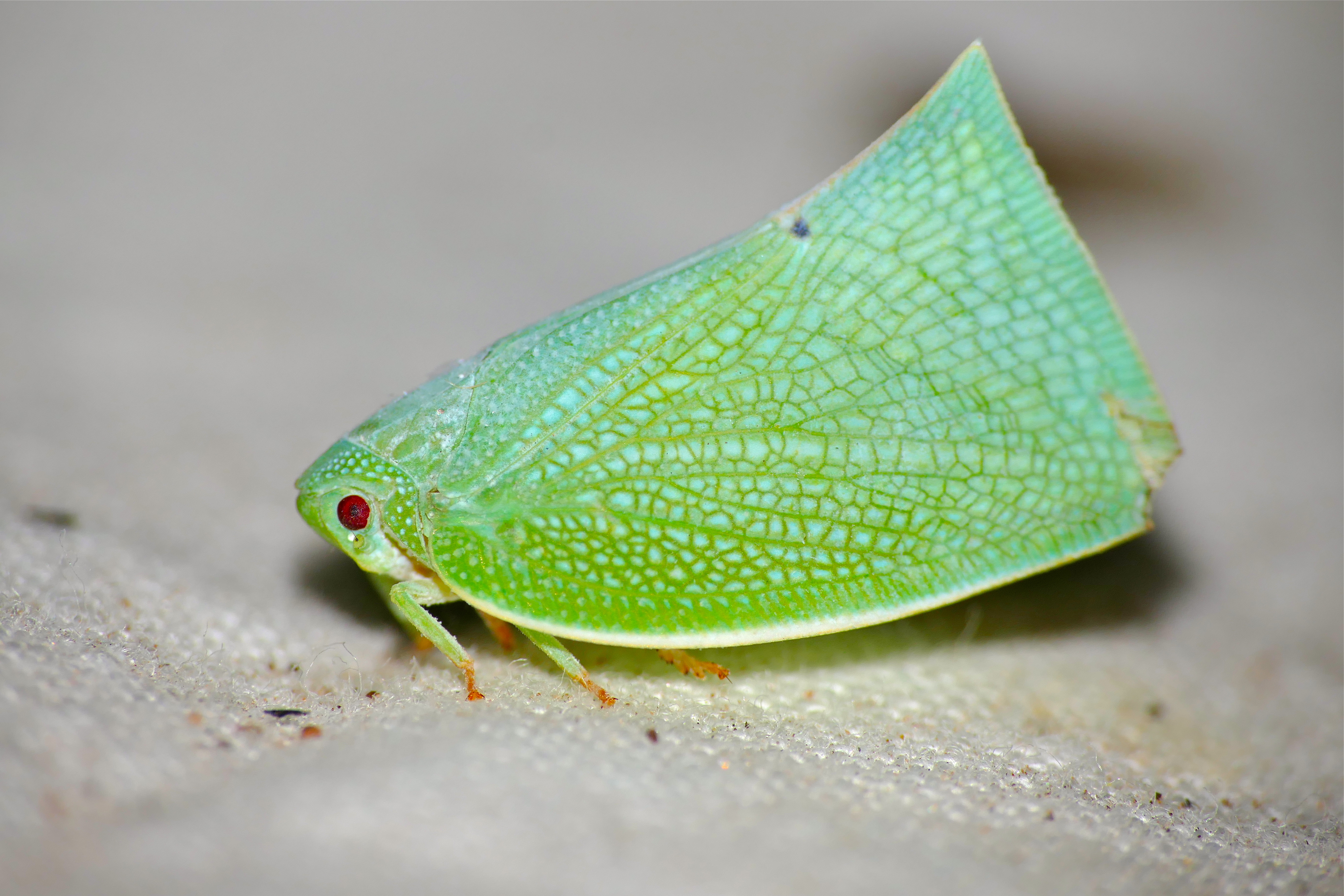
- Cryptoflata unipunctata

Scientific classification
- Kingdom: Animalia
- Phylum: Arthropoda
- Class: Insecta
- Order: Hemiptera
- Suborder: Auchenorrhyncha
- Infraorder: Fulgoromorpha
- Family: Flatidae
- Subfamily: Flatinae; Spinola, 1839

= Flatinae =

Subfamily of planthoppers

The Flatinae are a subfamily of planthoppers, erected by Maximilian Spinola in 1839. Genera have been recorded from all continents except Antarctica: especially in tropical and subtropical regions.

== Description ==
Like all other planthoppers, they suck phloem from plants. The antennae are small and the second segment is longer and ends in a bulge and a flagellum arises from it. They have two ocelli and nymphs have a tail of waxy filaments. Of the two sub-families in the Flatidae, the bodies of adult Flatinae are flattened laterally and the tegmina are tent-like (unlike the Flatoidinae, where the body is not laterally compressed and the tegmina are not as tent-like).

== Tribes and genera ==
Eight tribes are included by Fulgoromorpha Lists on The Web (FLOW) and BioLib:

=== Ceryniini ===
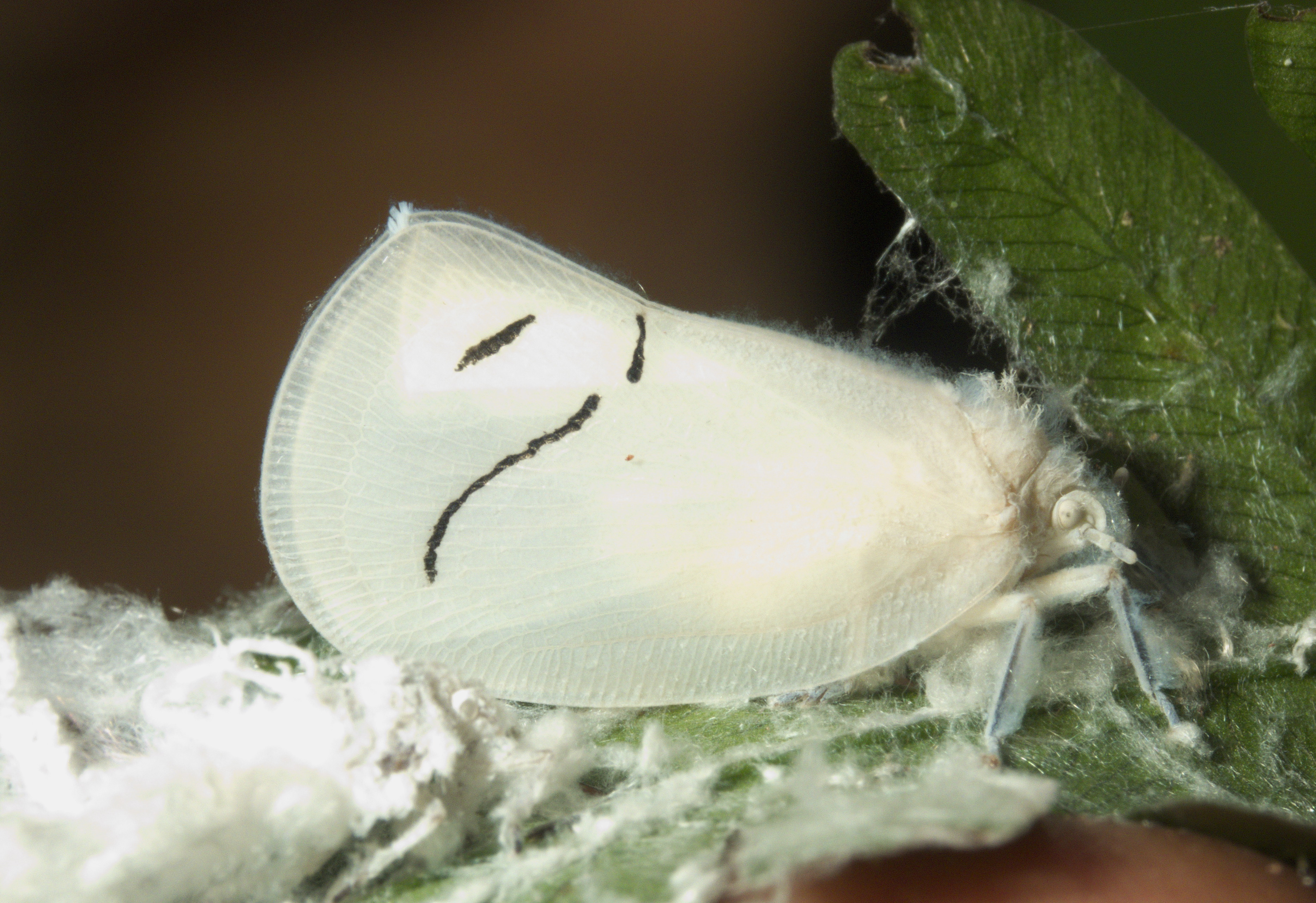
Cerynia maria

Auth. Distant, 1906

1. Adelidoria Metcalf, 1952
2. Adexia Melichar, 1901
3. Bythopsyrna Melichar, 1901
4. Cenestra Stål, 1862
5. Cerynia Stål, 1862
6. Copsyrna Stål, 1862
7. Doriana Metcalf, 1952

=== Flatini ===
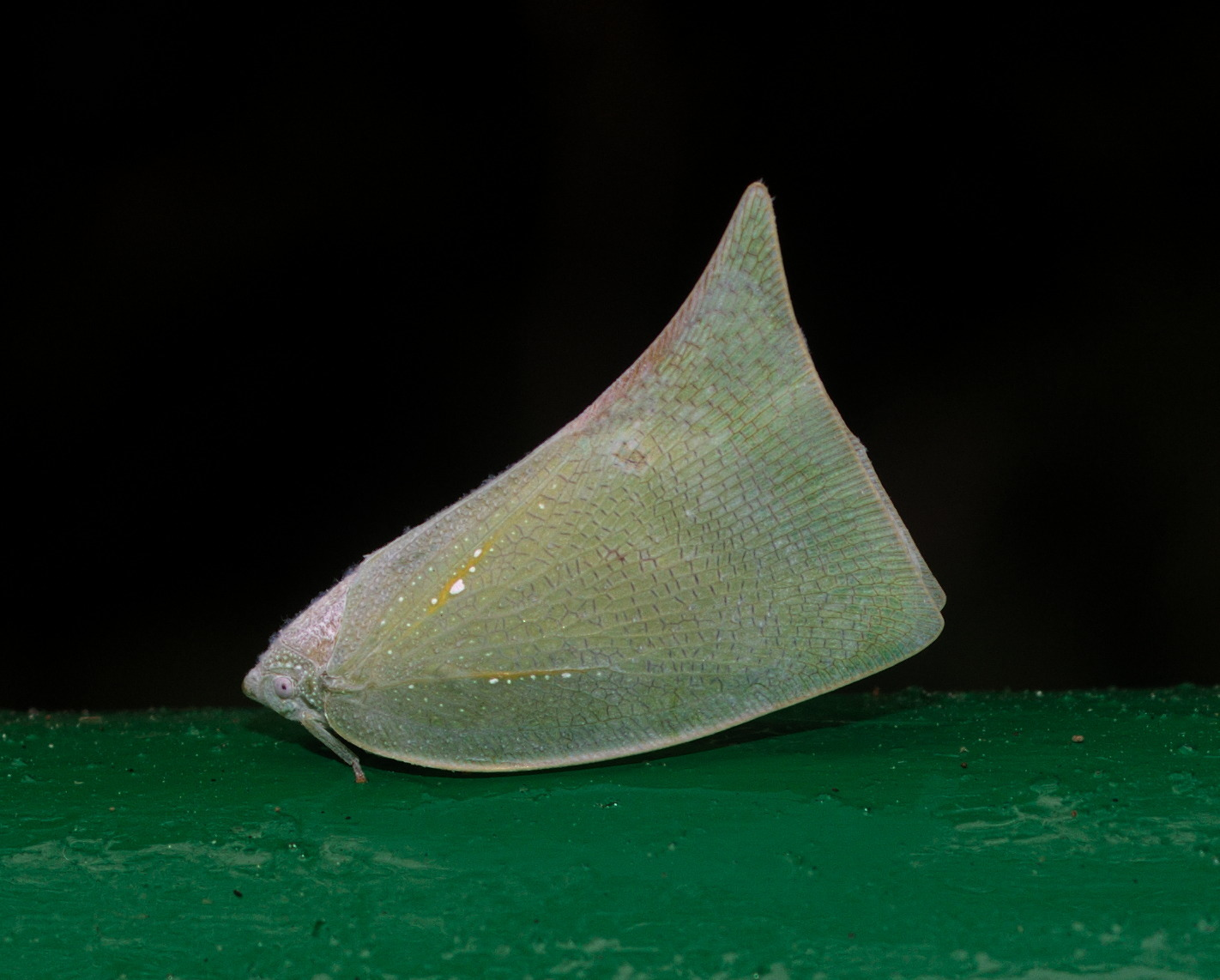
Lawana imitata

Auth. Spinola, 1839

subtribe Flatina Spinola, 1839

1. Cameruniola Strand, 1928
2. Decipha Medler, 1988
3. Flata Fabricius, 1798
4. Flatomorpha Melichar, 1901
5. Paranotus Karsch, 1890

subtribe Lawanina Melichar, 1923

1. Circumdaksha Distant, 1910
2. Cromna Walker, 1857
3. Eumelicharia Kirkaldy, 1906
4. Lawana Distant, 1906
5. Neocromna Distant, 1910
6. Neodaksha Distant, 1910
7. Oryxa Melichar, 1901
8. Phylliana Metcalf, 1952

subtribe Phyllyphantina Melichar, 1923

1. Neosalurnis Distant, 1910
2. Paracromna Melichar, 1901
3. Phyllyphanta Amyot & Audinet-Serville, 1843
4. Pulastya Distant, 1906
5. Salurnis Stål, 1870

subtribe Scarpantina Melichar, 1923

1. Colobesthes Amyot & Audinet-Serville, 1843
2. Scarpanta Stål, 1862
3. Scarpantina Melichar, 1901

subtribe Siphantina Melichar, 1923

1. Aflata Melichar, 1902
2. Burnix Medler, 1988
3. Carthaeomorpha Melichar, 1901
4. Dakshiana Metcalf & Bruner, 1948
5. Euphanta Melichar, 1902
6. Euryphantia Kirkaldy, 1906
7. Geraldtonia Distant, 1910
8. Hesperophantia Kirkaldy, 1904
9. Lesabes Medler, 1988
10. Siphanta Stål, 1862
11. Utakwana Distant, 1914

=== Nephesini ===
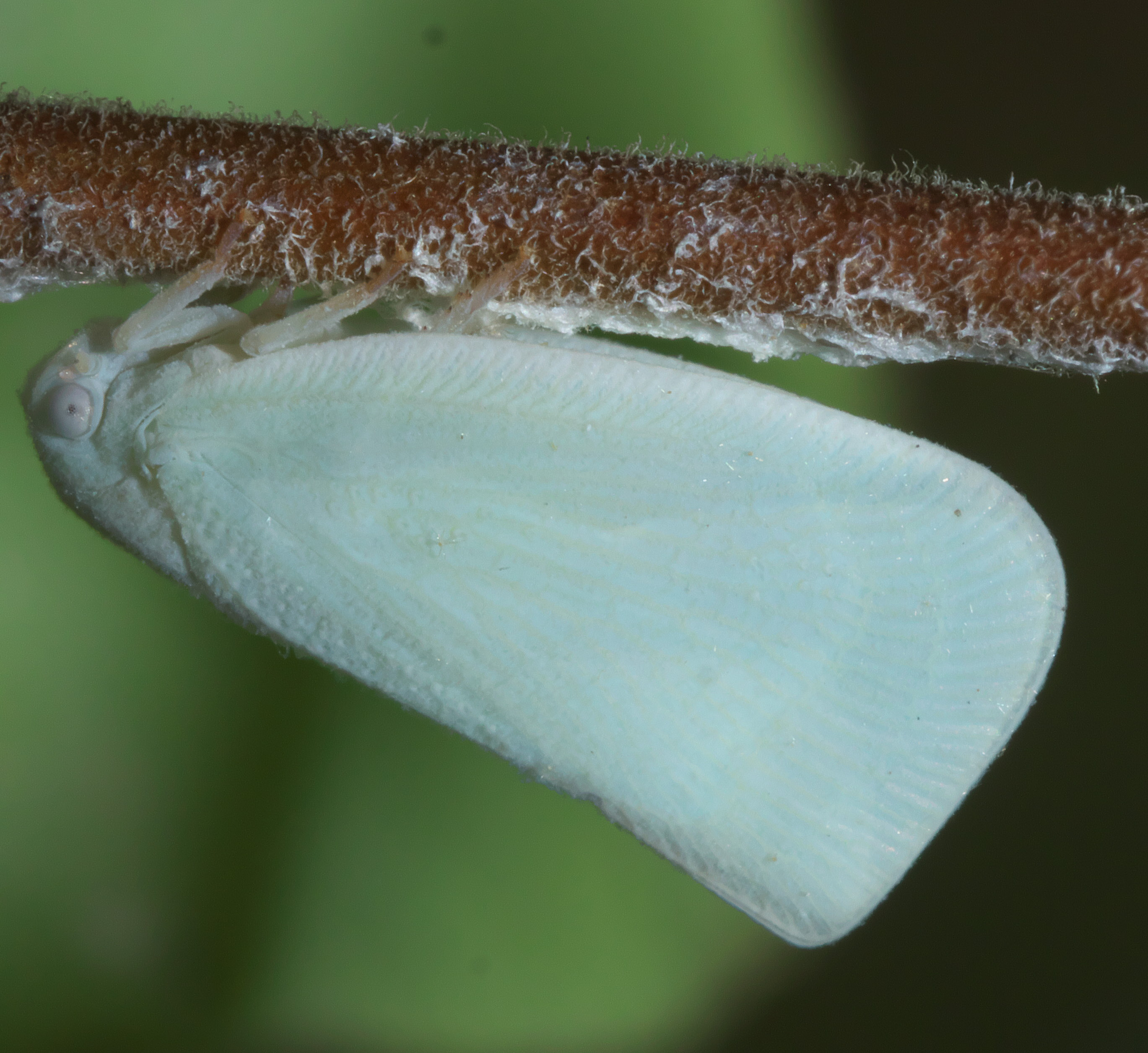
Flatormenis proxima

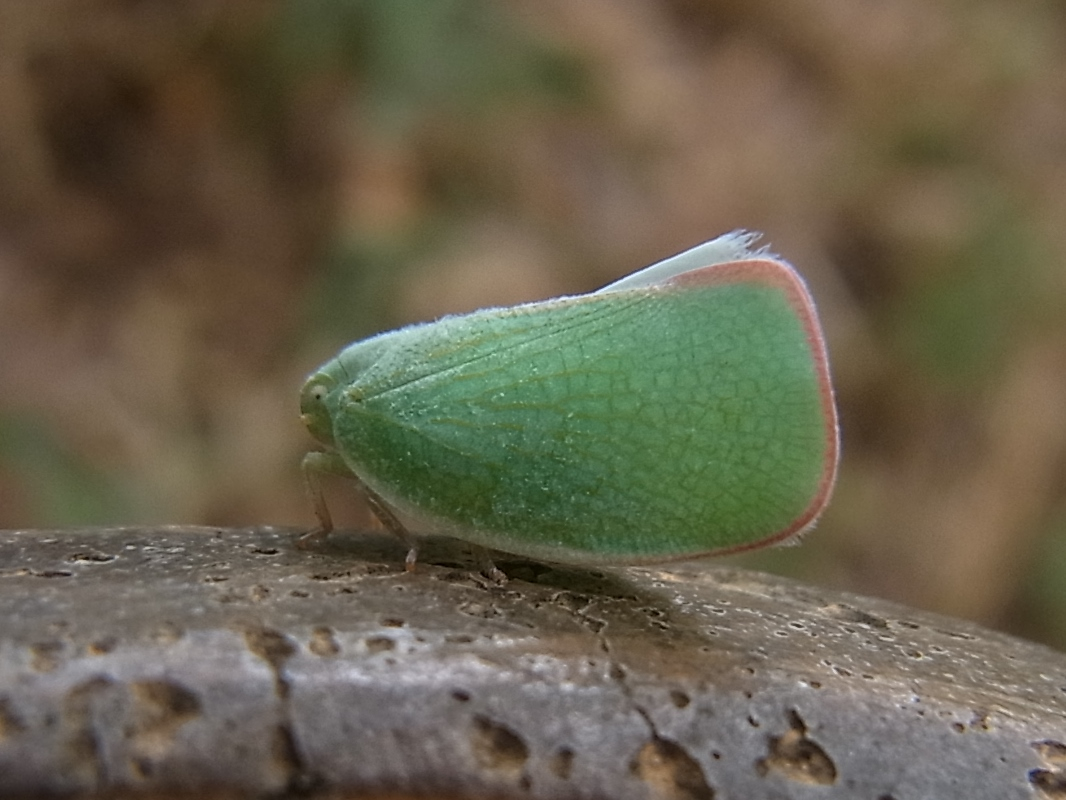
Geisha distinctissima

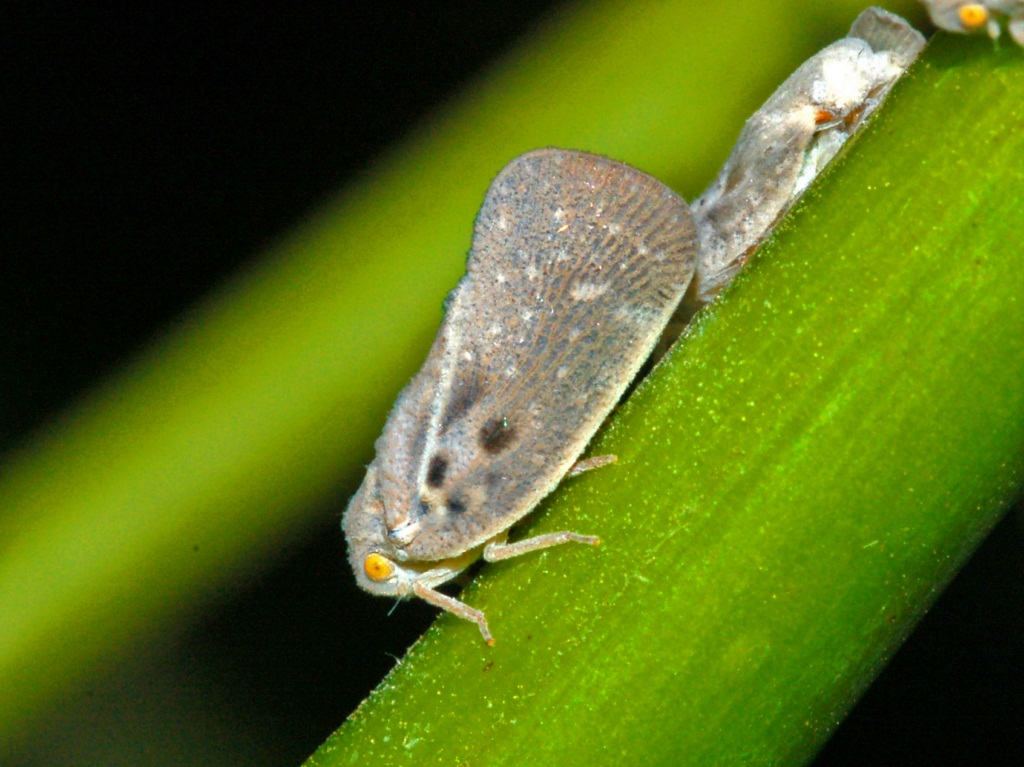
Metcalfa pruinosa

Auth. Distant, 1906

subtribe Cryptoflatina Melichar, 1923

1. Acrophaea Melichar, 1901
2. Anormenis Melichar, 1923
3. Antillormenis Fennah, 1942
4. Chaetormenis Melichar, 1923
5. Cryptoflata Melichar, 1901
6. Epormenis Fennah, 1945
7. Flatoptera Melichar, 1901
8. Flatormenis Melichar, 1923
9. Geisha Kirkaldy, 1900
10. Gyarina Melichar, 1901
11. Hansenia Melichar, 1901
12. Ilesia Fennah, 1942
13. Leptoflata Lallemand, 1931
14. Leptormenis Melichar, 1923
15. Melicharia Kirkaldy, 1900
16. Melormenis Metcalf, 1938
17. Melormenoides Metcalf, 1954
18. Metcalfa Caldwell & Martorell, 1951
19. Monoflata Melichar, 1923
20. Neoflata Melichar, 1923
21. Okenana Distant, 1912
22. Ormenana Metcalf & Bruner, 1948
23. Ormenaria Metcalf & Bruner, 1948
24. Ormenis Stål, 1862
25. Ormenoides Melichar, 1923
26. Panormenis Melichar, 1923
27. Paratella Melichar, 1901
28. Paroxychara Lallemand & Synave, 1952
29. Parthenormenis Fennah, 1949
30. Petrusa Stål, 1862
31. Phyllodryas Kirkaldy, 1913
32. Sephena Melichar, 1901
33. Ulundia Distant, 1910

subtribe Nephesina Distant, 1906

1. Idume Stål, 1866
2. Nakta Distant, 1906
3. Neomelicharia Kirkaldy, 1903
4. Nephesa Amyot & Audinet-Serville, 1843
5. Paraflatoptera Lallemand, 1939
6. Tejasa Distant, 1906
7. Tetraceratium Muir, 1924
8. Unnata Distant, 1906

subtribe Phaedolina Melichar, 1923

1. Phaedolus Karsch, 1890

subtribe Pseudoflatina Melichar, 1923

1. Caesonia Stål, 1866
2. Colgar Kirkaldy, 1900
3. Colgaroides Distant, 1910 - Planthoppers
4. Dalapax Amyot & Audinet-Serville, 1843
5. Gyaria Stål, 1862
6. Gyariella Schmidt, 1924
7. Pauliana Lallemand, 1950
8. Rhinophantia Melichar, 1901

subtribe unplaced

1. Acutisha Medler, 1991
2. Herbiflata Peng, Fletcher & Zhang, 2016
3. Hilavrita Distant, 1906
4. Kayania Distant, 1910
5. Lecopia Medler, 1991
6. Nivalios Zhang, Peng & Wang, 2011
7. Nullina Medler, 1991
8. Sabaethis Jacobi, 1916
9. Sanurus Melichar, 1901
10. Somisha Medler, 1991

=== Phantiini ===
Auth. Melichar, 1923

1. Apolexis Jacobi, 1936
2. Byllis Stål, 1866
3. Calauria Stål, 1866
4. Mesophantia Melichar, 1901
5. Microflata Melichar, 1901
6. Phantia Fieber, 1866
7. Phantiopsis Melichar, 1905

=== Phromniini ===
Auth. Distant, 1906

1. Acanthoflata Fieber, 1866
2. Alcaxor Fennah, 1947
3. Anggira Distant, 1906
4. Anthoflata Fennah, 1947
5. Capistra Fennah, 1947
6. Chaturbuja Distant, 1906
7. Conflata Schmidt, 1912
8. Danavara Distant, 1906
9. Delostenopium Jacobi, 1928
10. Dermoflata Melichar, 1901
11. Flatida White, 1846 (= Phromnia Stål, 1862)
12. Flatidissa Metcalf, 1952
13. Flatina Melichar, 1901
14. Flatiris Fennah, 1947
15. Flatosoma Melichar, 1901
16. Ityraea Stål, 1866
17. Lechaea Stål, 1866
18. Ormenina Fennah, 1947
19. Papuanella Distant, 1914
20. Paraflata Melichar, 1901
21. Poeciloflata Melichar, 1901
22. Psenoflata Fennah, 1947
23. Riculiflata Fennah, 1947

=== Poekillopterini ===
Auth. Kirkaldy, 1907

1. Poekilloptera Latreille, 1796

=== Selizini ===
Auth. Distant, 1906

1. Afrocyarda Fennah, 1965
2. Afrodascalia Fennah, 1958
3. Afroseliza Fennah, 1961
4. Anadascalia Melichar, 1923
5. Anidora Melichar, 1901
6. Arelate Stål, 1862
7. Armorseliza Ai, Yang & Zhang, 2019
8. Austrodascalia Fletcher, 1988
9. Barsac Fletcher, 1988
10. Cryptobarsac Fletcher & Moir, 2002
11. Cyarda Walker, 1858
12. Cyphopterum Melichar, 1905
13. Dascalia Stål, 1862
14. Dascalina Melichar, 1902
15. Dascaliomorpha Melichar, 1923
16. Dascanga Medler, 2000
17. Deocerus Metcalf & Bruner, 1948
18. Derisa Melichar, 1901
19. Euhyloptera Fennah, 1945
20. Eurima Melichar, 1901
21. Eurocalia Van Duzee, 1907
22. Eurocerus Metcalf, 1945
23. Exoma Melichar, 1902
24. Farona Melichar, 1901
25. Flatula Melichar, 1901
26. Gomeda Distant, 1906
27. Grapaldus Distant, 1914
28. Griveaudus Stroinski & Swierczewski, 2014
29. Hameishara Linnavuori, 1973
30. Hyphancylus Fowler, 1904
31. Increda Medler, 2001
32. Jamella Kirkaldy, 1906 (J. australiae, or pandanus planthopper, pest to Pandanus tectorius)
33. Juba Jacobi, 1901
34. Kelyflata Swierczewski & Stroinski, 2019
35. Ketumala Distant, 1906
36. Lembakaria Swierczewski & Stroinski, 2019
37. Leptodascalia Melichar, 1923
38. Locrona Fennah, 1945
39. Massila Walker, 1862
40. Meulona Zia, 1935
41. Mistharnophantia Kirkaldy, 1907
42. Mosiona Melichar, 1923
43. Paradascalia Metcalf, 1938
44. Paragomeda Distant, 1914
45. Paraketumala Distant, 1912
46. Paraseliza Melichar, 1923
47. Planodascalia Metcalf & Bruner, 1948
48. Pseudodascalia Melichar, 1923
49. Pseudoseliza Peng, Wang & Zhang, 2010
50. Sajuba Medler, 2001
51. Satapa Distant, 1906
52. Scarposa Uhler, 1895
53. Seliza Stål, 1862
54. Stenocyarda Fennah, 1965
55. Urana Melichar, 1902
56. Zarudnya Melichar, 1901
57. Zecheuna Zia, 1935

=== Sisciini ===
Auth. Melichar, 1923

1. Aulophorina Strand, 1928
2. Euryprosthius Karsch, 1890
3. Latois Stål, 1866
4. Phlebopterum Stål, 1854
5. Siscia Stål, 1870

=== incertae sedis ===
1. Anaya Distant, 1906
2. Byllisana Metcalf & Bruner, 1948
3. Daeda Banks, 1910
4. Daksha Distant, 1906
5. Flatopsis Melichar, 1902
6. Hypsiphanta Jacobi, 1928
7. Mimophantia Matsumura, 1900
8. Paradaksha Distant, 1910
9. Phymoides Distant, 1910
10. Pulaha Distant, 1906
11. Summanus Distant, 1916
- unplaced monotypic genera from Socotra island:
1. Haloflata Swierczewski, Malenovsky & Stroinski, 2017
2. Medleria Swierczewski, Malenovsky & Stroinski, 2018
