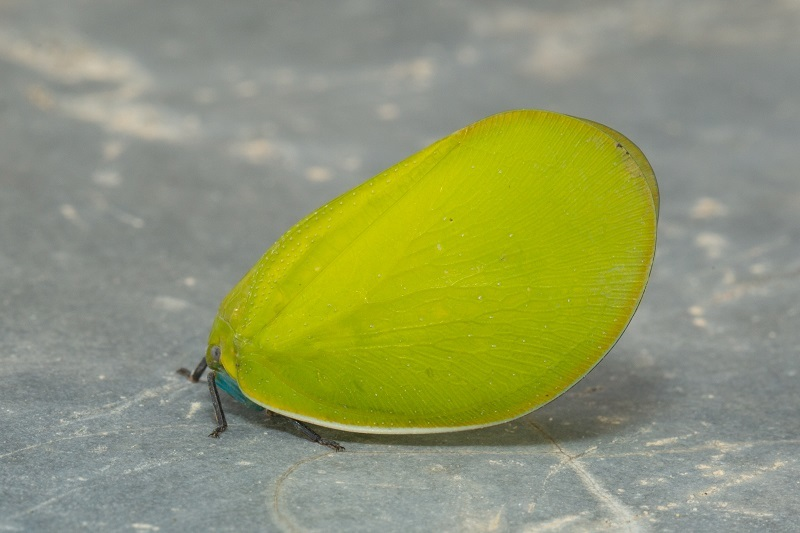
- Flatosoma signoreti

Scientific classification
- Kingdom: Animalia
- Phylum: Arthropoda
- Clade: Pancrustacea
- Class: Insecta
- Order: Hemiptera
- Suborder: Auchenorrhyncha
- Infraorder: Fulgoromorpha
- Family: Flatidae
- Subfamily: Flatinae
- Tribe: Phromniini
- Genus: Flatosoma; Melichar, 1901

= Flatosoma =

Genus of planthoppers

Flatosoma is a genus of planthoppers in the family Flatidae. It was first described by Leopold Melichar in 1901. Species in the genus are found in Sabah, Malaysia.

== Species ==
FLOW lists the following species (which may have been originally placed in the genus Paraflata):

1. Flatosoma diastola (Schmidt, 1909)
2. Flatosoma signoreti (Melichar, 1901)
