= Neosalurnis =

Scientific classification
- Kingdom: Animalia
- Phylum: Arthropoda
- Clade: Pancrustacea
- Class: Insecta
- Order: Hemiptera
- Suborder: Auchenorrhyncha
- Infraorder: Fulgoromorpha
- Family: Flatidae
- Subfamily: Flatinae
- Tribe: Flatini
- Genus: Neosalurnis; Distant, 1910

Genus of planthoppers

Neosalurnis is a genus of planthoppers in the family Flatidae, erected by William Lucas Distant in 1910. It was subsequently placed in tribe Flatini, subtribe Phyllyphantina by Metcalf (1957) Records of occurrence (possibly incomplete) are currently from Vietnam and China.

== Species ==
Fulgoromorpha Lists on the Web includes:

1. Neosalurnis bonenda Medler, 1992
2. Neosalurnis decalis Medler, 1992
3. Neosalurnis gracilis (Melichar, 1902) - type species
  (as Phyllyphanta gracilis Melichar, 1902, then Lawana bicarinata Distant, then Neosalurnis reticulatus Distant, 1910)
4. Neosalurnis insignis Medler, 1992
5. Neosalurnis insula Medler, 1992
6. Neosalurnis magnispinata Wang, Peng & Yuan, 2005
7. Neosalurnis teralis Medler, 1992
