= Poeciloflata =

Scientific classification
- Kingdom: Animalia
- Phylum: Arthropoda
- Clade: Pancrustacea
- Class: Insecta
- Order: Hemiptera
- Suborder: Auchenorrhyncha
- Infraorder: Fulgoromorpha
- Family: Flatidae
- Tribe: Phromniini
- Genus: Poeciloflata; Melichar, 1901

Genus of planthoppers

Poeciloflata is a genus of planthoppers in the family Flatidae. It was first described by Leopold Melichar in 1901. Species in the genus are found in Sulawesi, Indonesia.

== Species ==
- Poeciloflata lurida (Melichar, 1902)
- Poeciloflata modesta (Donovan, 1805)
- Poeciloflata viridana (Donovan, 1805)
