= Latois =

Scientific classification
- Kingdom: Animalia
- Phylum: Arthropoda
- Clade: Pancrustacea
- Class: Insecta
- Order: Hemiptera
- Suborder: Auchenorrhyncha
- Infraorder: Fulgoromorpha
- Family: Flatidae
- Genus: Latois; Stål, 1866

Genus of true bugs

Latois is a genus of insects in the hemipteran family Flatidae. The species of this genus are found in Madagascar.

== Species ==
- Latois antica (Signoret, 1860)
- Latois frontalis Melichar, 1901
- Latois major Melichar, 1901
- Latois nigrofasciata Swierczewski & Stroinski, 2012
- Latois suturalis (Signoret, 1860)
