= Oryxa =

Scientific classification
- Domain: Eukaryota
- Kingdom: Animalia
- Phylum: Arthropoda
- Class: Insecta
- Order: Hemiptera
- Suborder: Auchenorrhyncha
- Infraorder: Fulgoromorpha
- Family: Flatidae
- Tribe: Flatini
- Genus: Oryxa; Melichar, 1902

Type species
- Oryxa truncata Melichar, 1902 (= Oryxa melichari Kirkcaldy, 1913)

Genus of planthoppers

Oryxa is a genus of planthoppers in the hemipteran family Flatidae. They live on the islands of Borneo and Sumatra, and in Malaysia.

The genus was established in 1902 by Leopold Melichar in his monograph of the families Acanaloniidae and Flatidae. Melichar designated Carl Linnaeus' O. truncata to be the type species of his new genus, but Melichar's specimens were not of the species described by Linnaeus. A replacement name of Oryxa melichari was therefore chosen for Melichar's species; the status of Linnaeus' species remains unclear.

== Species ==
Fulgoromorpha Lists on the Web includes:

1. Oryxa carinulata (Schmidt, 1904)
2. Oryxa extendens Melichar, 1902
3. Oryxa melichari Kirkaldy, 1913
