= Mesophantia =

Scientific classification
- Kingdom: Animalia
- Phylum: Arthropoda
- Clade: Pancrustacea
- Class: Insecta
- Order: Hemiptera
- Suborder: Auchenorrhyncha
- Infraorder: Fulgoromorpha
- Family: Flatidae
- Subfamily: Flatinae
- Genus: Mesophantia; Melichar, 1902

Genus of planthoppers

Mesophantia is a genus of planthoppers in the family Flatidae, established by Leopold Melichar in 1902.

== Species ==
- Mesophantia kanganica Dlabola, 1983
- Mesophantia pallens Melichar, 1902
- Mesophantia sabzevaranica Dlabola, 1983
- Mesophantia tisina Dlabola, 1983
