= Paracromna =

Scientific classification
- Kingdom: Animalia
- Phylum: Arthropoda
- Clade: Pancrustacea
- Class: Insecta
- Order: Hemiptera
- Suborder: Auchenorrhyncha
- Infraorder: Fulgoromorpha
- Family: Flatidae
- Tribe: Flatini
- Genus: Paracromna; Melichar, 1901

Species
- Paracromna punctata (Fowler, 1900); Paracromna rotundior (Fowler, 1900)

Genus of planthoppers

Paracromna is a genus of planthoppers in the family Flatidae. It was first described by Leopold Melichar in 1901.
