= Cerynia =

Cerynia or Kerynia (Ancient Greek: Κερυνία) may refer to:

- Keryneia, in Cyprus
- Ceryneia, in Greece
- Cerynia (planthopper), a genus of insects in the family Flatidae
