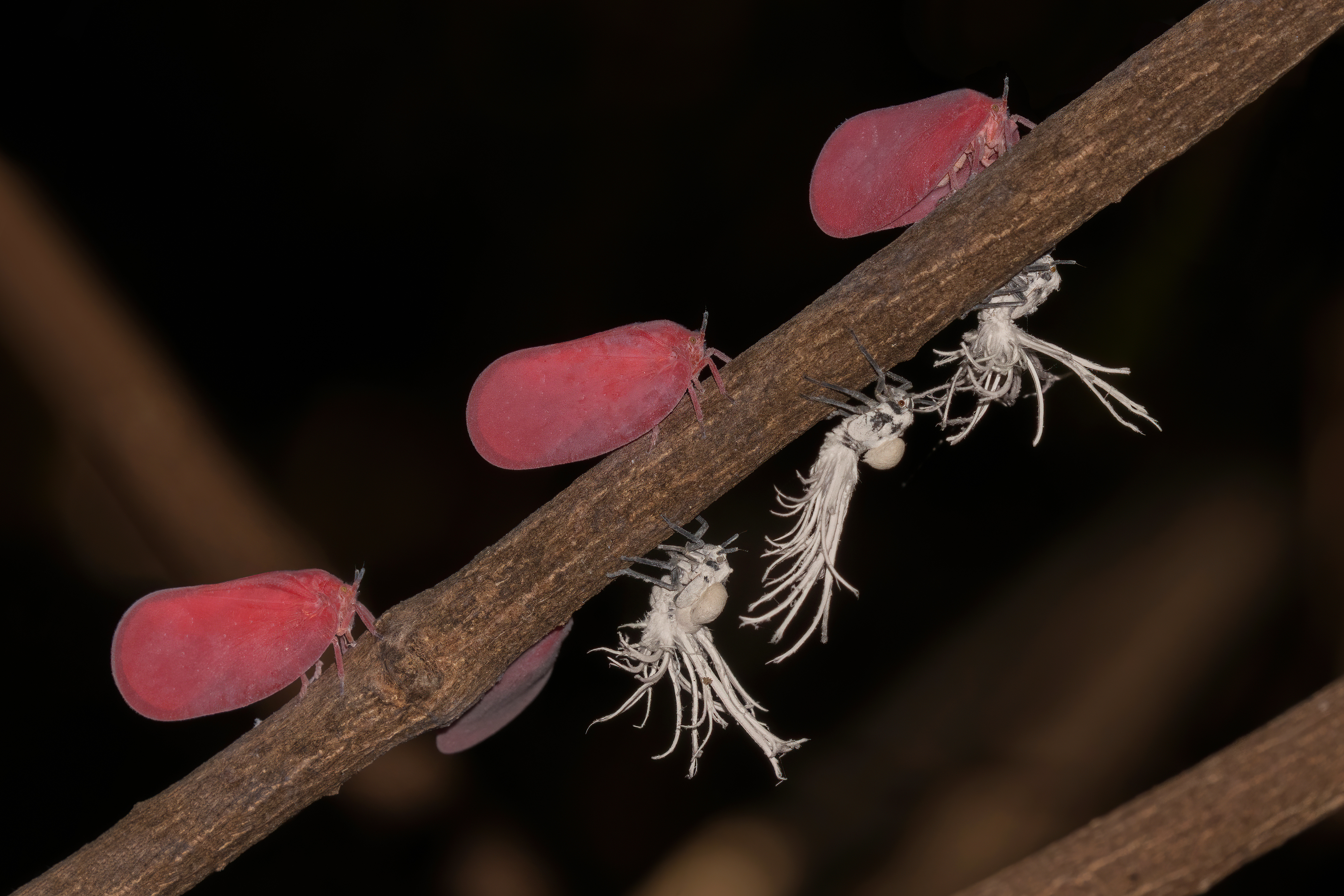

Scientific classification
- Kingdom: Animalia
- Phylum: Arthropoda
- Clade: Pancrustacea
- Class: Insecta
- Order: Hemiptera
- Suborder: Auchenorrhyncha
- Infraorder: Fulgoromorpha
- Family: Flatidae
- Genus: Flatida
- Species: F. rosea

Binomial name
- Flatida rosea (Melichar, 1901)

Synonyms
- Flata rosea Melichar, 1901; Phromnia rosea (Melichar, 1901)

= Flatida rosea =

Species of insect

Flatida rosea, the flower-spike bug or the flatid leaf bug, is a species of planthopper in the family Flatidae. It is found in tropical dry forests in Madagascar, and the adult insects are gregarious, the groups orienting themselves in such a way that they resemble a flower spike.

The adults have wide pink wings which they hold vertically in a tent-like fashion, concealing the whole body. The nymphs have no wings, but can move about, and are defensively covered in wispy white wax, with a plume of waxy tendrils. Like other bugs in this family, both adults and nymphs feed by piercing the bark with their mouthparts and sucking sap from the phloem. The adults are mobile and can jump if disturbed.

Flatida rosea feed on the liana Elachyptera minimiflora. The nymphs produce copious quantities of honeydew and the Coquerel's coua (Coua coquerelii) feeds on this.
