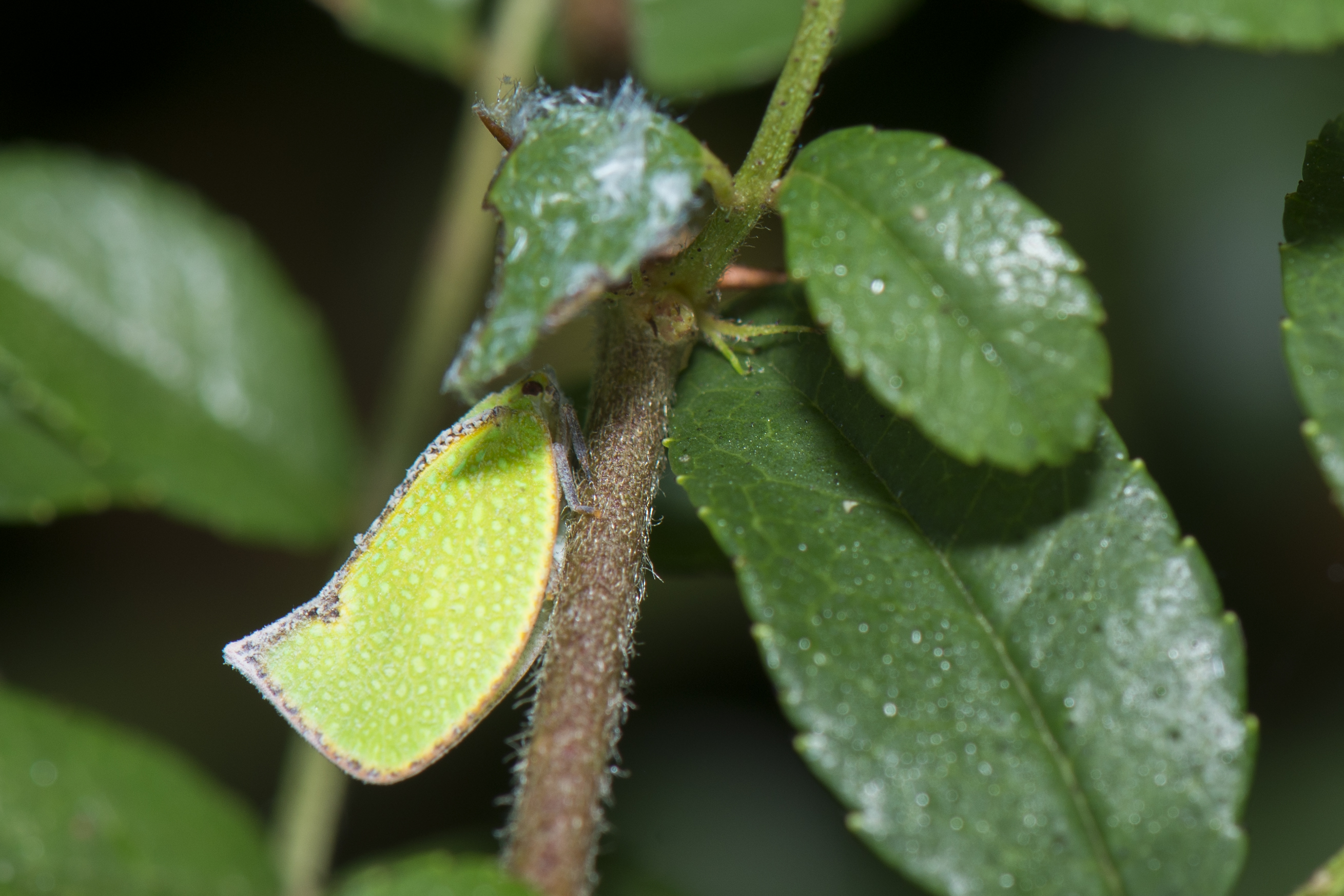
- Salurnis marginella

Scientific classification
- Missing taxonomy template (fix): Salurnis

= Salurnis =

Genus of planthoppers

Salurnis is a genus of Asian planthoppers in the family Flatidae, erected by Carl Stål in 1870; it is now placed in the tribe Flatini, subtribe Phyllyphantina. Records of occurrence are currently from India, China, Korea, Indochina and western Malesia.

== Species ==
Fulgoromorpha Lists on the Web includes:

1. Salurnis bipunctata (Walker, 1862)
2. Salurnis dilina Medler, 1992
3. Salurnis dulitana Lallemand, 1939 (2 subspecies)
4. Salurnis estora Medler, 1992
5. Salurnis granulosa Stål, 1870 – type species
6. Salurnis hesita Medler, 1992
7. Salurnis kryala Medler, 1992
8. Salurnis lastendis Medler, 1992
9. Salurnis marginella (Guérin-Méneville, 1829)
