= Flatina =

Scientific classification
- Kingdom: Animalia
- Phylum: Arthropoda
- Clade: Pancrustacea
- Class: Insecta
- Order: Hemiptera
- Suborder: Auchenorrhyncha
- Infraorder: Fulgoromorpha
- Family: Flatidae
- Tribe: Phromniini
- Genus: Flatina; Melichar, 1901

Genus of planthoppers

Flatina is a genus of planthoppers in the family Flatidae. It was first described by Leopold Melichar in 1901. Species from the genus are found in Cameroon, the Democratic Republic of the Congo, Guinea, the Ivory Coast, the Republic of the Congo, and Sierra Leone.

== Species ==
- Flatina binotata Melichar, 1901
- Flatina circellaris Melichar, 1901
- Flatina elegantula Lallemand, 1949
- Flatina fumbriata (Walker, 1858)
- Flatina flavescens Melichar, 1901
- Flatina inornata Melichar, 1901
- Flatina liciata Melichar, 1901
- Flatina rubrotincta (Haglund, 1899)
