= Cromna (planthopper) =

Scientific classification
- Domain: Eukaryota
- Kingdom: Animalia
- Phylum: Arthropoda
- Class: Insecta
- Order: Hemiptera
- Suborder: Auchenorrhyncha
- Infraorder: Fulgoromorpha
- Family: Flatidae
- Tribe: Flatini
- Genus: Cromna; Walker, 1857

Species
- See text

Synonyms
- Cromma Signoret, 1860 (Missp.); Flata (Cromna) Stål, 1866

Genus of planthoppers

Cromna is a genus of fulgoroid planthoppers in the family Flatidae. It was described by Francis Walker in 1857.

== Species ==
FLOW include the following, with records from Indochina and northern Borneo:

1. Cromna acutipennis (Walker, 1857) - type species
2. Cromna albopunctata (Kirby, 1891)
3. Cromna andamanensis (Distant, 1906)
4. Cromna sinensis (Walker, 1851)

Species brought to synonymy

- Phyllyphanta albidosparsa Distant, 1910
- Cromna angulifera, synonym of Phyllyphanta angulifera
- Cromna aspera, synonym of Colgar asperum
- Cromna centralis, synonym of Neomelicharia sparsa
- Cromna chlorospila, synonym of Taparella doryca
- Cromna elegans, synonym of Siphanta acuta
- Cromna farinosa, synonym of Colgar farinosa
- Cromna frontalis, synonym of Colgaroides acuminata
- Cromna nasalis, synonym of Euphanta munda
- Cromna notata, synonym of Colgar notata
- Cromna obtusa, synonym of Colgar albescens
- Cromna peracuta, synonym of Parasalurnis roseicincta
- Cromna quadripunctata, synonym of Euphanta quadripunctata
- Cromna surrecta, synonym for Colgar surrectum
