= Flatomorpha =

Scientific classification
- Kingdom: Animalia
- Phylum: Arthropoda
- Clade: Pancrustacea
- Class: Insecta
- Order: Hemiptera
- Suborder: Auchenorrhyncha
- Infraorder: Fulgoromorpha
- Family: Flatidae
- Tribe: Flatini
- Genus: Flatomorpha; Melichar, 1901

Genus of planthoppers

Flatomorpha is a genus of planthoppers in the family Flatidae, with species records from Malesia. It was first described by Leopold Melichar in 1901.

The species in the genus are:

- Flatomorpha biglypta Medler, 1999
- Flatomorpha disguisa Medler, 1999
- Flatomorpha inclusa Melichar, 1902
- Flatomorpha robusta Medler, 1996
- Flatomorpha rubrata Medler, 1999
- Flatomorpha umbrimargo (Walker, 1858)
