= Adexia =

Scientific classification
- Kingdom: Animalia
- Phylum: Arthropoda
- Clade: Pancrustacea
- Class: Insecta
- Order: Hemiptera
- Suborder: Auchenorrhyncha
- Infraorder: Fulgoromorpha
- Family: Flatidae
- Tribe: Ceryniini
- Genus: Adexia; Melichar, 1901

Genus of planthoppers

Adexia is a genus of planthoppers in the family Flatidae. It was first described by Leopold Melichar in 1901.

The species in the genus are:

- Adexia columbica Ossiannilsson, 1940
- Adexia erminia (Fowler, 1900)
- Adexia fowleri Melichar, 1901
- Adexia melanoneura Melichar, 1901
