= Dermoflata =

Scientific classification
- Kingdom: Animalia
- Phylum: Arthropoda
- Clade: Pancrustacea
- Class: Insecta
- Order: Hemiptera
- Suborder: Auchenorrhyncha
- Infraorder: Fulgoromorpha
- Family: Flatidae
- Subfamily: Flatinae
- Tribe: Phromniini
- Genus: Dermoflata; Melichar, 1901
- Species: D. rotundata

Binomial name
- Dermoflata rotundata Melichar, 1901

Genus of planthoppers

Dermoflata rotundata is a species of planthopper in the family Flatidae. It is the only species in the monotypic genus Dermoflata. It was first described by Leopold Melichar in 1901. It is found in Indonesia and Malaysia.
