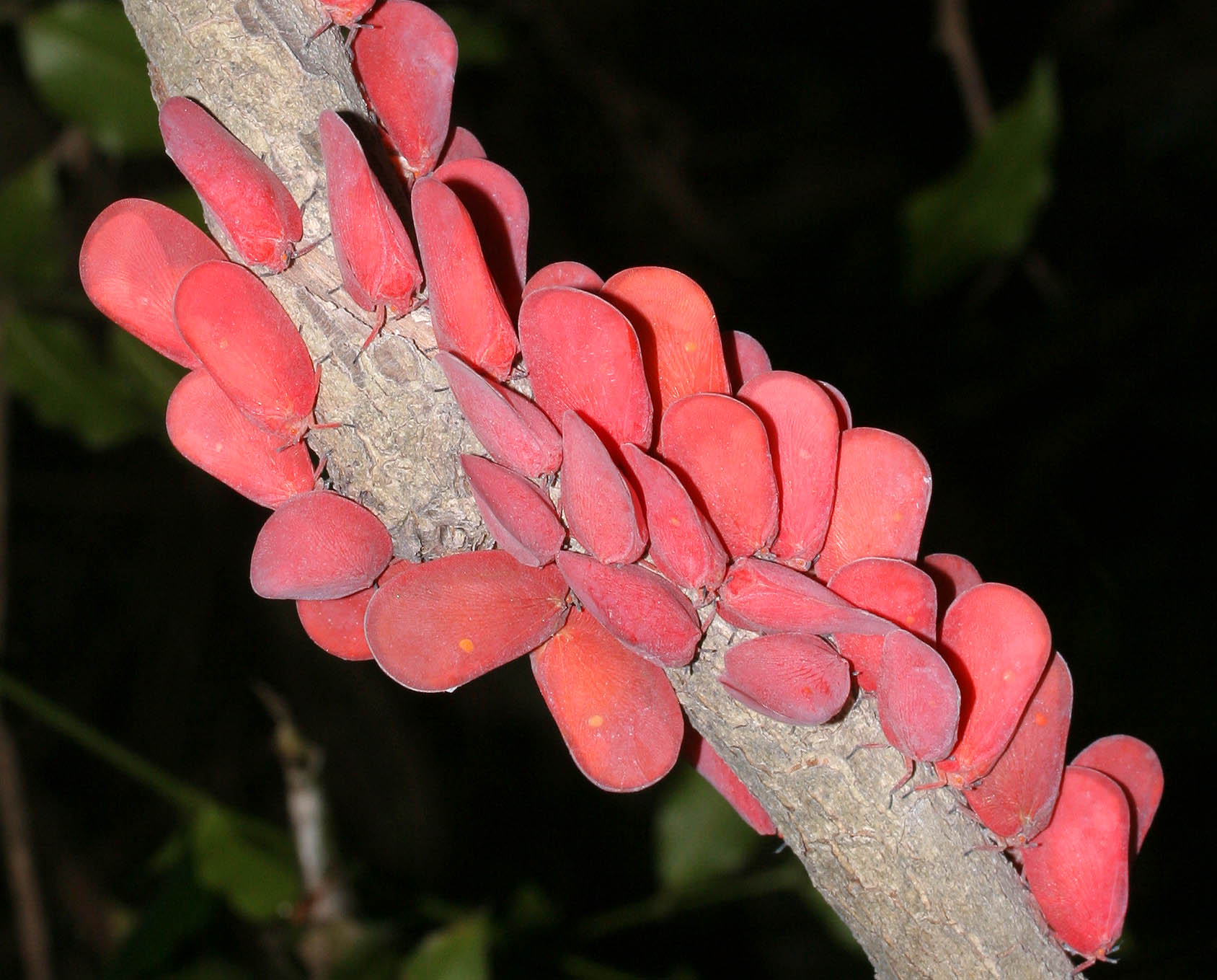
- adults of F. rosea
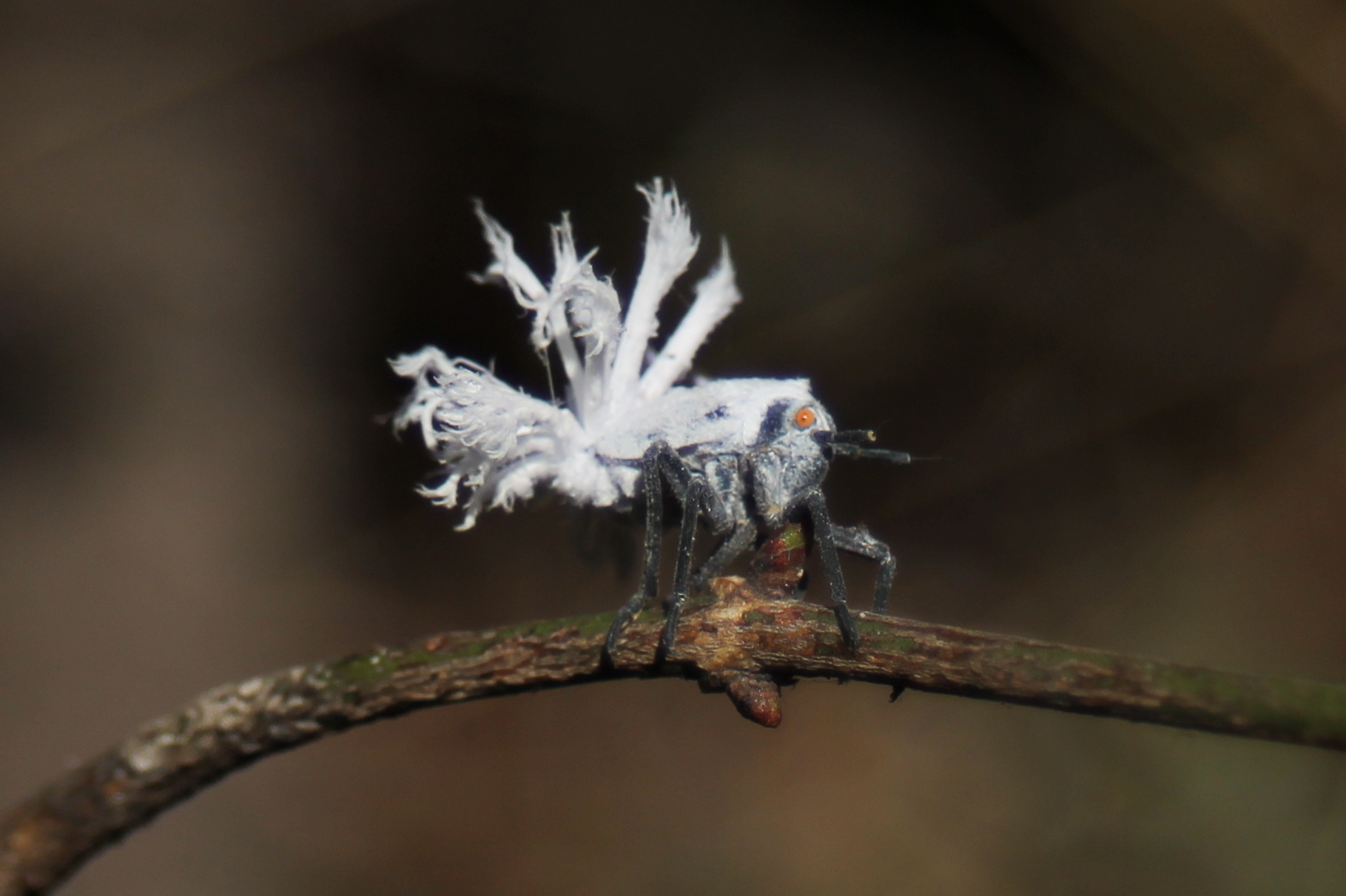
- nymph of F. coccinea

Scientific classification
- Kingdom: Animalia
- Phylum: Arthropoda
- Clade: Pancrustacea
- Class: Insecta
- Order: Hemiptera
- Suborder: Auchenorrhyncha
- Infraorder: Fulgoromorpha
- Family: Flatidae
- Tribe: Phromniini
- Genus: Flatida; White, 1846

Synonyms
- Phromnia Stål, 1862

= Flatida =

Genus of planthoppers

Flatida is a genus of planthoppers in the family Flatidae and tribe Phromniini. Much of the literature on this genus refers to the name Phromnia, which has recently been recognized to be a junior synonym of Flatida. Species from the genus are found in tropical Africa and Asia.

== Species ==
- Flatida aeruginosa (Schmidt, 1904)
- Flatida angolensis (Distant, 1910)
- Flatida bimaculata (Schmidt, 1912)
- Flatida bombycoides (Guérin-Méneville, 1844)
- Flatida cingulata Melichar, 1901
- Flatida coccinea (Auber, 1955)
- Flatida deltotensis (Kirby, 1891)
- Flatida flammicoma (Auber, 1954)
- Flatida floccosa (Guérin-Méneville, 1829)
- Flatida flosculina (Auber, 1955)
- Flatida hilaris (Gerstaecker, 1895)
- Flatida inornata (Walker, 1851)
- Flatida intacta (Walker, 1851)
- Flatida intermedia (Melichar, 1901)
- Flatida limbata (Fabricius, 1781)
- Flatida malgacha (Guérin-Méneville, 1844)
- Flatida marginata (Lallemand, 1942)
- Flatida marginella (Olivier, 1791)
- Flatida melichari (China, 1925)
- Flatida montivaga (Distant, 1892)
- Flatida neavei (Distant, 1910)
- Flatida ochreata (Melichar, 1901)
- Flatida pallida (Olivier, 1791)
- Flatida rosea (Melichar, 1901)
- Flatida rubescens (Stål, 1870)
- Flatida rubicunda (Distant, 1883)
- Flatida seriosa (Melichar, 1901)
- Flatida subguttata (Stål, 1870)
- Flatida superba (Melichar, 1901)
- Flatida tricolor (White, 1846)
- Flatida viridula (Atkinson, 1889)
