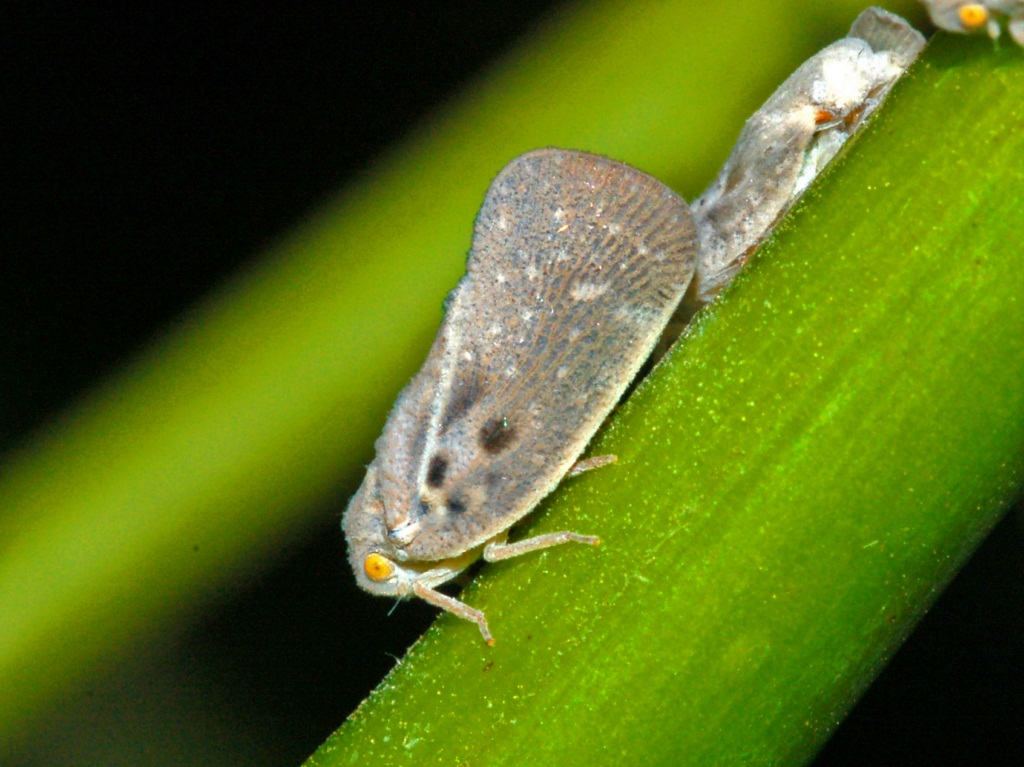
- Metcalfa pruinosa

Scientific classification
- Domain: Eukaryota
- Kingdom: Animalia
- Phylum: Arthropoda
- Class: Insecta
- Order: Hemiptera
- Suborder: Auchenorrhyncha
- Infraorder: Fulgoromorpha
- Family: Flatidae
- Tribe: Nephesini
- Genus: Metcalfa; Caldwell & Martorell, 1951

= Metcalfa =

Genus of planthoppers

Metcalfa is a genus of planthoppers in the Flatidae family and the tribe Nephesini. Species are essentially North American in origin, but M. pruinosa has been introduced to Europe (including Britain).

== Description ==
Usually, adults of Metcalfa are 5.5 to 8 mm in length and 2 to 3 mm in width at the widest point.

== Species ==
- Metcalfa frigida (Metcalf & Bruner, 1948)
- Metcalfa persea (Metcalf & Bruner, 1948)
- Metcalfa pruinosa (Say, 1830)
- Metcalfa regularis (Fowler, 1900)
- Metcalfa siboney (Metcalf & Bruner, 1948)

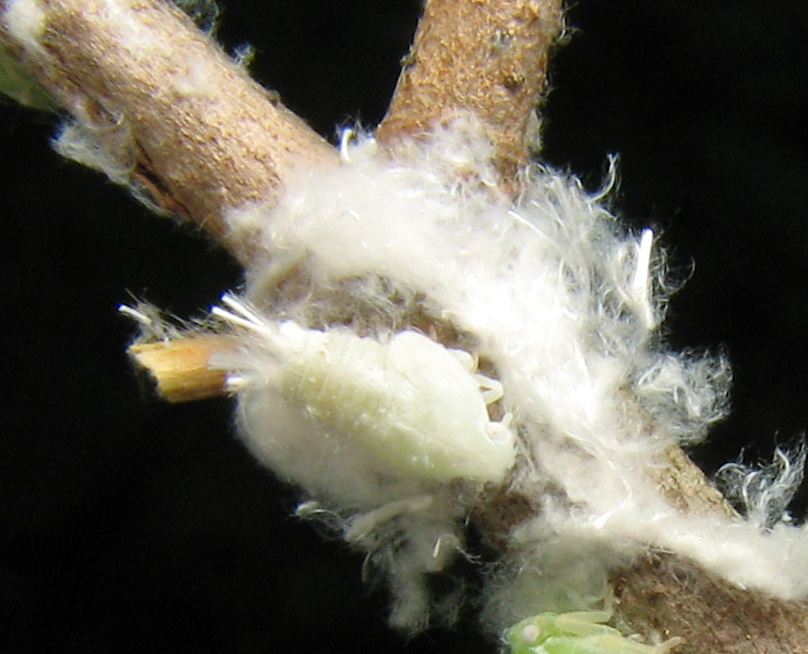
Nymph Metcalfa pruinosa)
