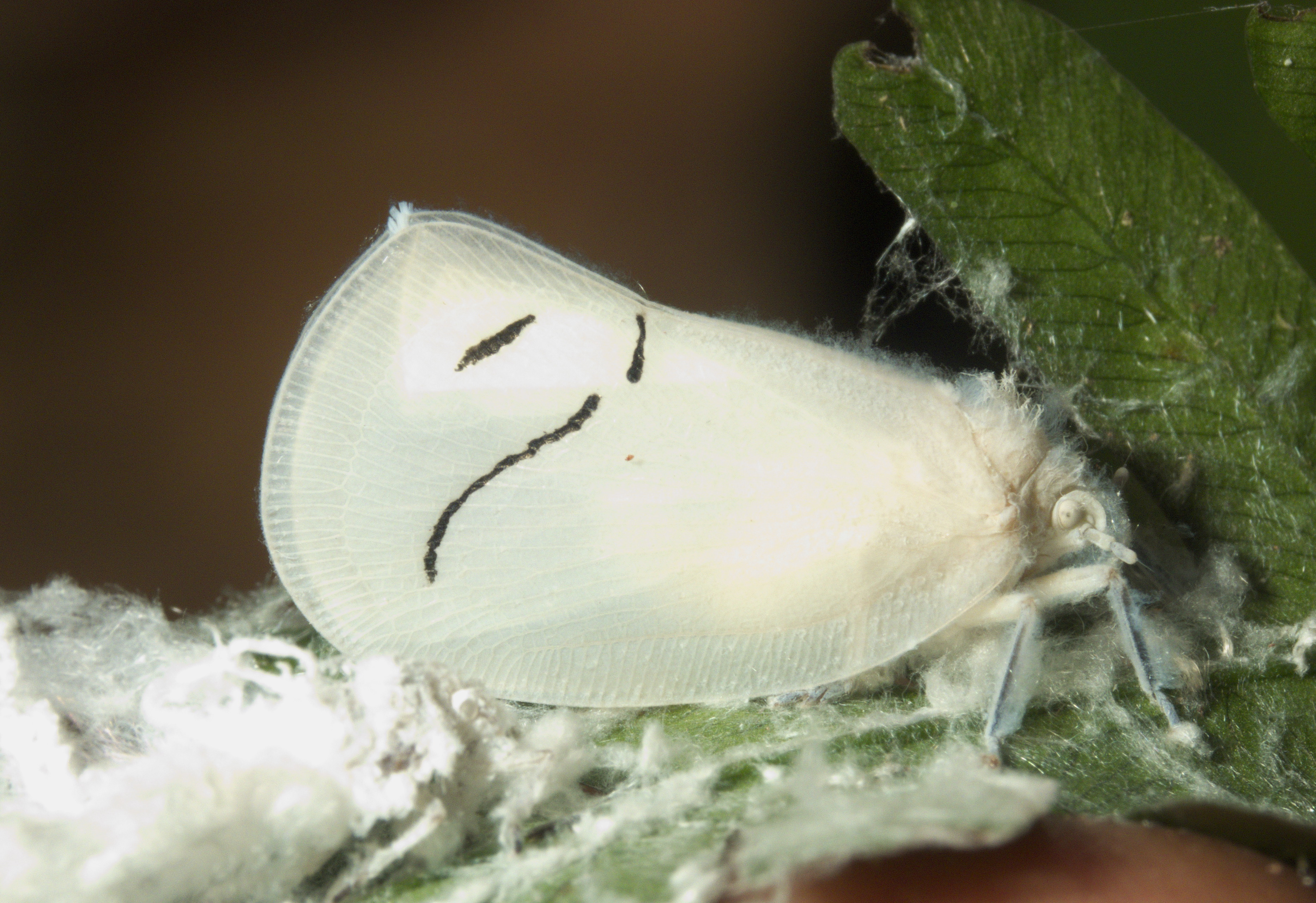
- From the Western Ghats

Scientific classification
- Kingdom: Animalia
- Phylum: Arthropoda
- Class: Insecta
- Order: Hemiptera
- Suborder: Auchenorrhyncha
- Infraorder: Fulgoromorpha
- Family: Flatidae
- Tribe: Ceryniini
- Genus: Cerynia; Stål, 1862

Type species
- Flata albata Stål, 1854

= Cerynia (planthopper) =

Genus of planthoppers

Cerynia is a genus of flatid planthoppers found mainly in Southeast Asian subtropical and tropical forests, with records from China, Vietnam, Borneo and the Philippines (almost certainly incomplete); it is typical of the tribe Ceryniini.

== Species ==
This genus includes:

1. Cerynia albata (Stål, 1854) - type species (as "Flata albata Stål, 1854 from Malaya")
2. Cerynia bilineata Ossiannilsson, 1940
3. Cerynia digitula Wang and Peng, 2007
4. Cerynia fulgida Melichar, 1901
5. Cerynia lineola Melichar, 1901
6. Cerynia maria (White, 1846) [=Cerynia nigropustulata Schmidt, 1904]
7. Cerynia mixana Medler, 1996
8. Cerynia monacha (Gerstaecker, 1895)
9. Cerynia parnassioides China, 1925
10. Cerynia trilineata Melichar, 1901
