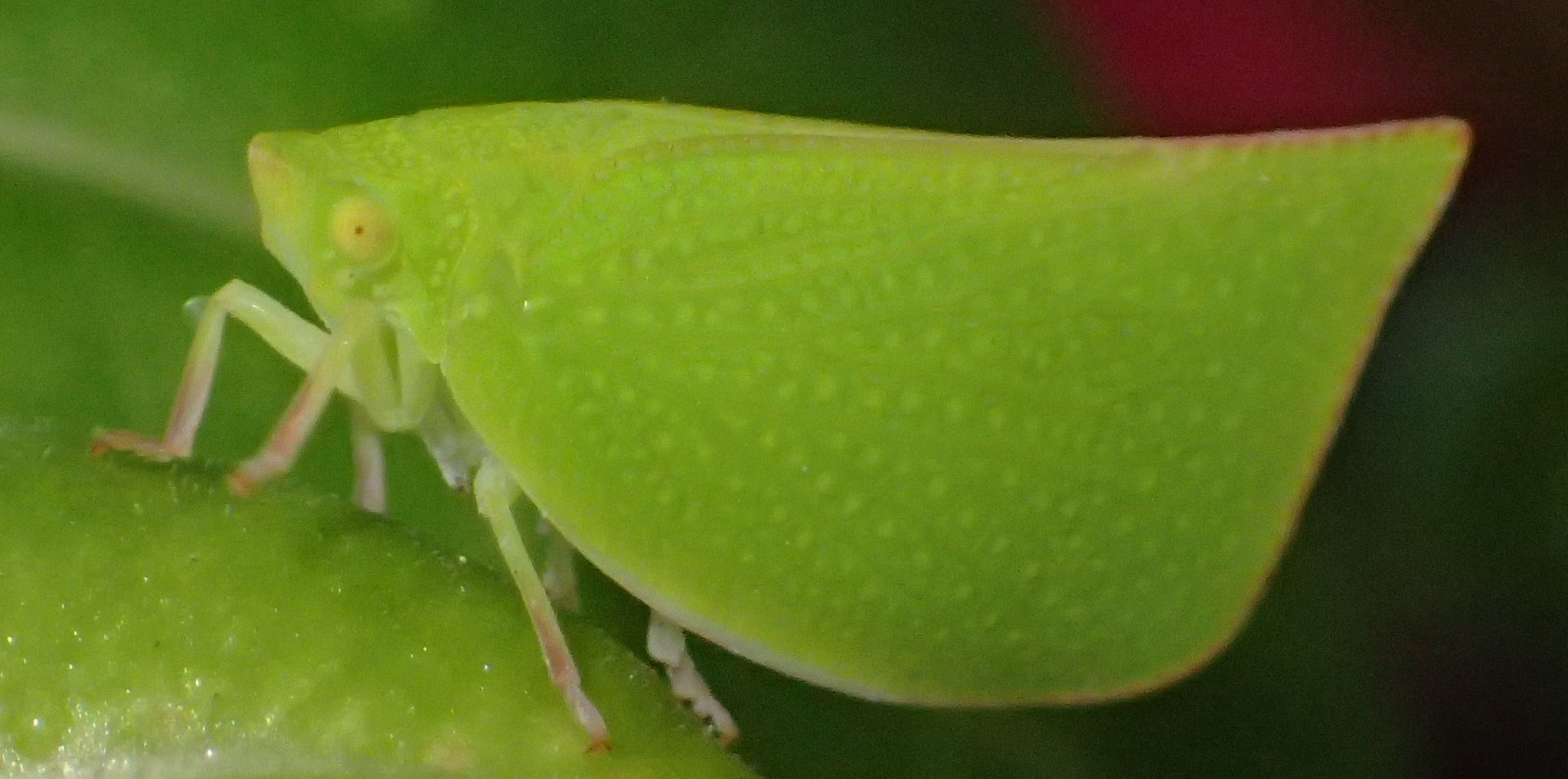

Scientific classification
- Kingdom: Animalia
- Phylum: Arthropoda
- Clade: Pancrustacea
- Class: Insecta
- Order: Hemiptera
- Suborder: Auchenorrhyncha
- Infraorder: Fulgoromorpha
- Family: Flatidae
- Genus: Siphanta
- Species: S. acuta

Binomial name
- Siphanta acuta (Walker, 1851)

Synonyms
- Cromna elegans (Costa, 1864); Phalainesthes schauinslandi (Kirkaldy, 1899); Poeciloptera acuta (Walker, 1851); Poeciloptera cupido (Walker, 1851); Poeciloptera hebes (Walker, 1851); Siphanta cupido (Walker, 1851); Siphanta elegans (Costa, 1864); Siphanta schauinslandi (Kirkaldy, 1899)

= Siphanta acuta =

Species of planthopper

Siphanta acuta is a species of planthopper in the family Flatidae; this species is native to Australia, but is now found in various other parts of the world. About 10 mm long, they resemble small leaves and are generally found in trees. Its common names are the green planthopper or leaf bug (in Australia and New Zealand), and the torpedo bug (in Hawaii).

== Description ==
Adult Siphanta acuta are large-winged (as are other members of the family Flatidae) and bright green. Their wings are triangular, sharply pointed at the tip, and sit held like a steep roof. Their wings project behind the end of their abdomen and almost reach the ground. Most of their body is concealed. A pointed head and distal segments of front and middle legs (sometimes tarsus of hind legs) are visible.

The body length of mature green planthoppers is around 9.3 mm. They have two pairs of wings, three pairs of legs, one pair of antennae, and compound eyes on either side of their head. They have piercing/sucking mouthparts and females have an ovipositor at the end of the abdomen.

Nymphs of Siphanta acuta are white with a pair of waxy filaments either side of the sixth abdominal segment, with two long tufts at the tip of the abdomen. Their form is like that of the mature form, with a rostrum to feed from, three pairs of legs, and a pair of antennae.

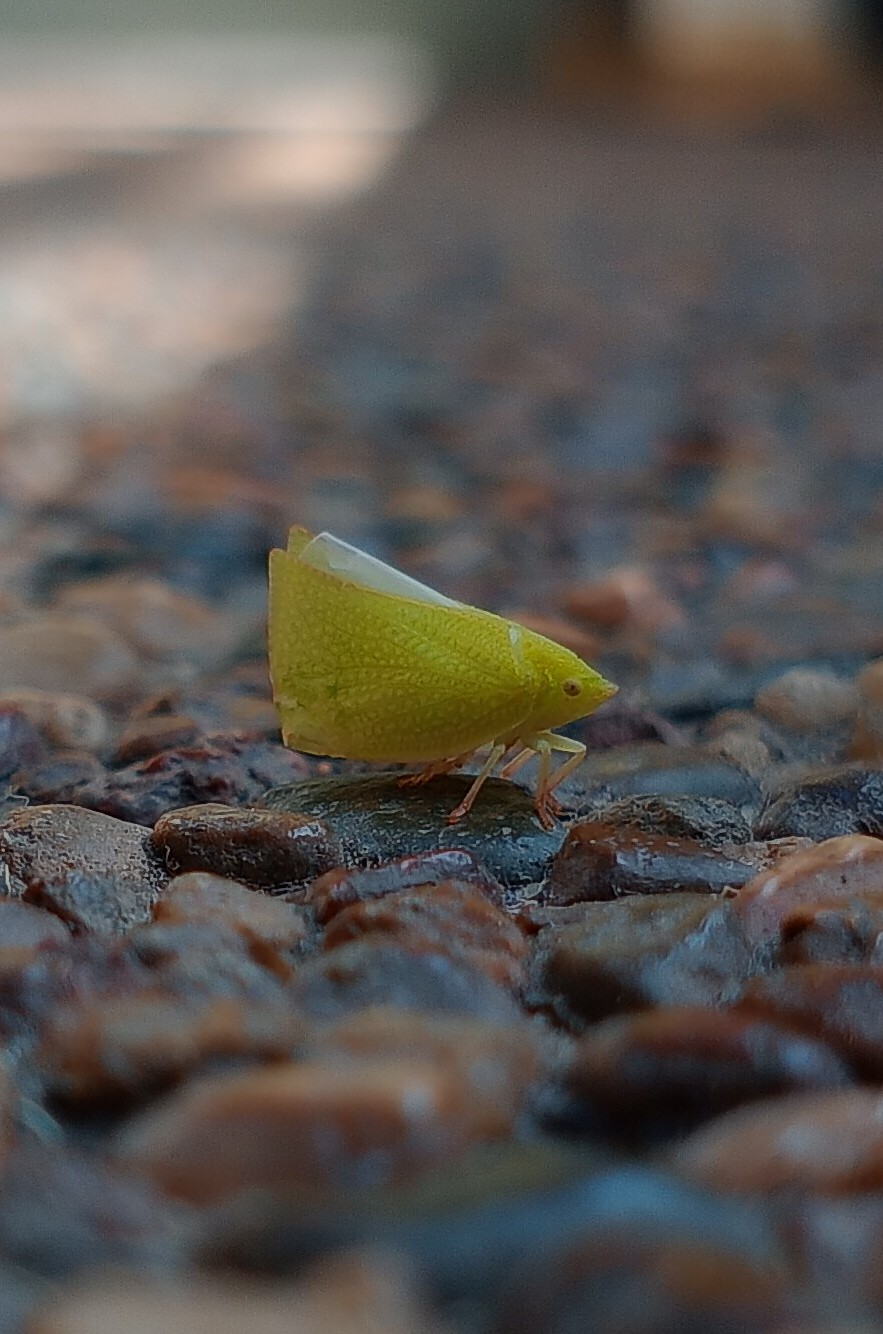
A Siphanta acuta on a balcony

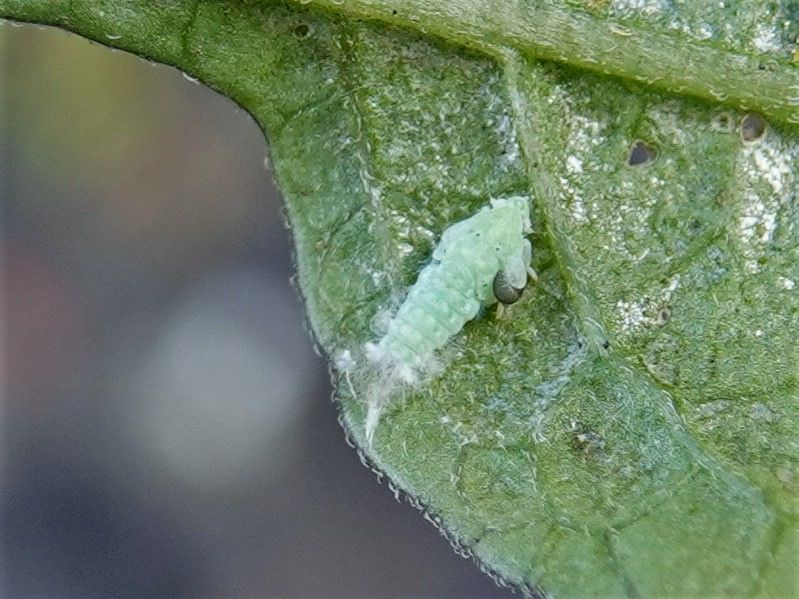
Siphanta acuta nymph

== Geographic distribution and habitat ==
=== Natural global range ===
Siphanta acuta naturally occurs in Australia (continentally and Tasmania), California (adventive), Hawaii (adventive), and South Africa (adventive).

=== New Zealand range ===
Within New Zealand, Siphanta acuta is found in both North and South Islands. Noted geographic distribution in the North Island includes Auckland, Bay of Plenty, Coromandel, Gisborne, Hawkes Bay, Northland, Taranaki, Wairarapa, Wanganui, Wellington, and the Waikato. Noted geographic distribution in the South Island includes Buller, Central Otago, Mid Canterbury, Nelson, and Westland.

=== Habitat preferences ===
Siphanta acuta’s preferred habitats tend to be lowland (often coastal) and montane. Individuals have been surveyed in a variety of environments, from gardens with native and introduced plants, to broadleaf and mixed forests, to moss on rocks at high altitude. Common host plants of Siphanta acuta within New Zealand are Coprosma, citrus trees, various ornamental shrubs. Within Australia they are found on a large variety of native and exotic plants.

Younger instars of Siphanta acuta are often found on leaves. Older ones are often found on stems, due to food preferences. Citrus is more popular among those found in the North Island. Those found in Nelson show preference to ornamental shrubs.

=== Life cycle and phenology ===
In terms of phenology, adult forms of Siphanta acuta are most common in summer and autumn. After mating, females usually lay 90-110 eggs on a leaf in a flat oval cluster via the ovipositor. These are known as egg-cushions, which turn from white to black, due to a fungus that grows on empty shells. The newly hatched forms are nymphs, which reside near their eggs for the first early part of their life, also known as the first instar.

Siphanta acuta molts to move through different instars/stages of growth and maturity. Second and third instars gradually become greener where they reach 3.6mm at the third, the fourth instars gain a small amount of reddish marks, and the fifth have white with pink markings.

== Diet, prey and predators ==
=== Diet and foraging ===
Siphanta acuta are sap feeders; they feed by puncturing the plant and ingesting the sap and nutrients from the plant. Younger instars of Siphanta acuta feed from the leaves of plants, while older individuals feed from the stem. Common host plants that Siphanta acuta feed from include coprosma, citrus trees, ornamental shrubs (within New Zealand), and a large variety of native and exotic species within Australia.

=== Predators, parasites and diseases ===
Siphanta acuta are commonly parasitized. A hymenopteran, Aphanomerus pusillus, parasitizes the eggs. They were used as a form of biological control to reduce green planthopper numbers in America. This parasite or a closely allied one has also been observed in New Zealand, specifically Whangarei where they were noted emerging in large numbers; mostly from eggs, some in a variety of ages, and a couple from mature planthoppers.

Dryinus koebelei (Dryinidae) are another parasitoid of planthoppers, and act by their larva attaching under the wing buds of planthopper nymphs. Steel-blue ladybirds, Orcus chalybeus, are a common predator of Siphanta acuta, where they consume the egg cushions, most commonly in citrus orchards. It is also likely that other predatory species consume Siphanta acuta, such as birds and spiders.

== Other information ==
Siphanta acuta act as pests and are associated with Australian citrus die-back while also feeding on weeds like bridal creeper.
