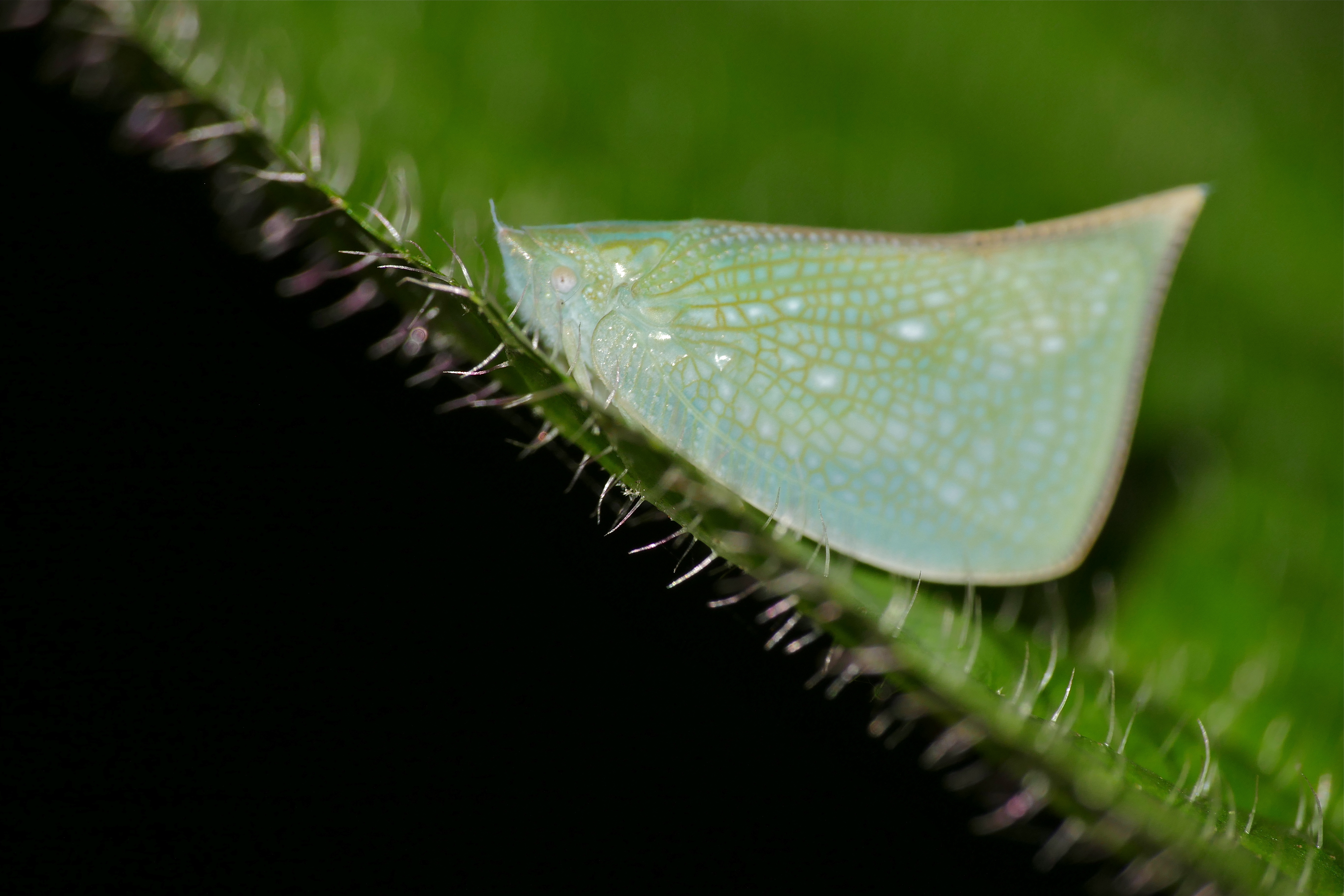
- Lawana sp.

Scientific classification
- Kingdom: Animalia
- Phylum: Arthropoda
- Class: Insecta
- Order: Hemiptera
- Suborder: Auchenorrhyncha
- Infraorder: Fulgoromorpha
- Family: Flatidae
- Subfamily: Flatinae
- Tribe: Flatini
- Genus: Lawana; Distant, 1906

Synonyms
- Phyma Melichar, 1902 (nomen praeoccupatum)

= Lawana =

Genus of planthoppers

Lawana is a genus of planthoppers in the family Flatidae, erected by William Lucas Distant in 1906. In 1923, Leopold Melichar confirmed placement of this genus in tribe Flatini and subtribe Lawanina. Species are recorded from tropical Africa and Asia.

== Species ==
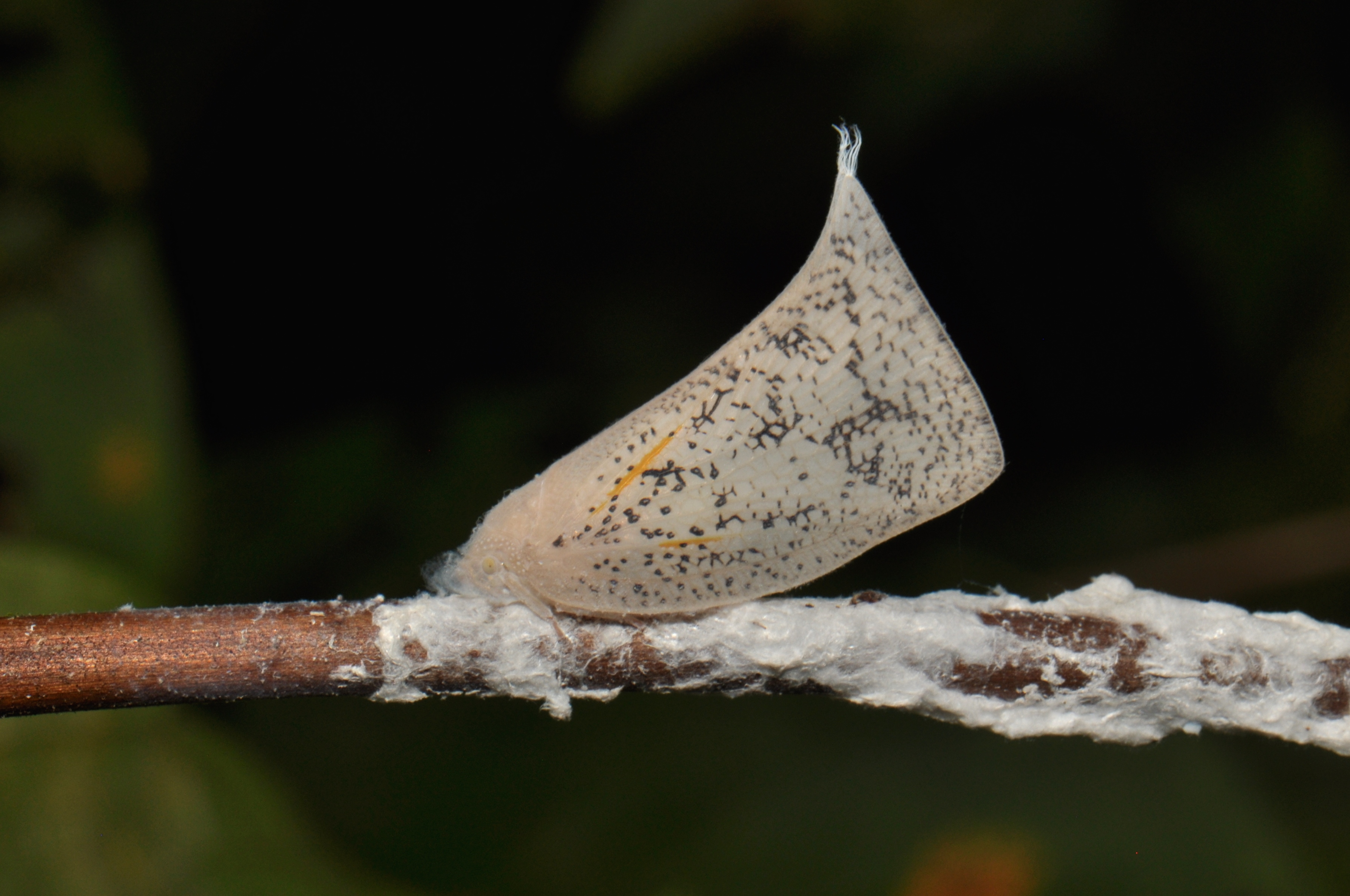
Lawana conspersa

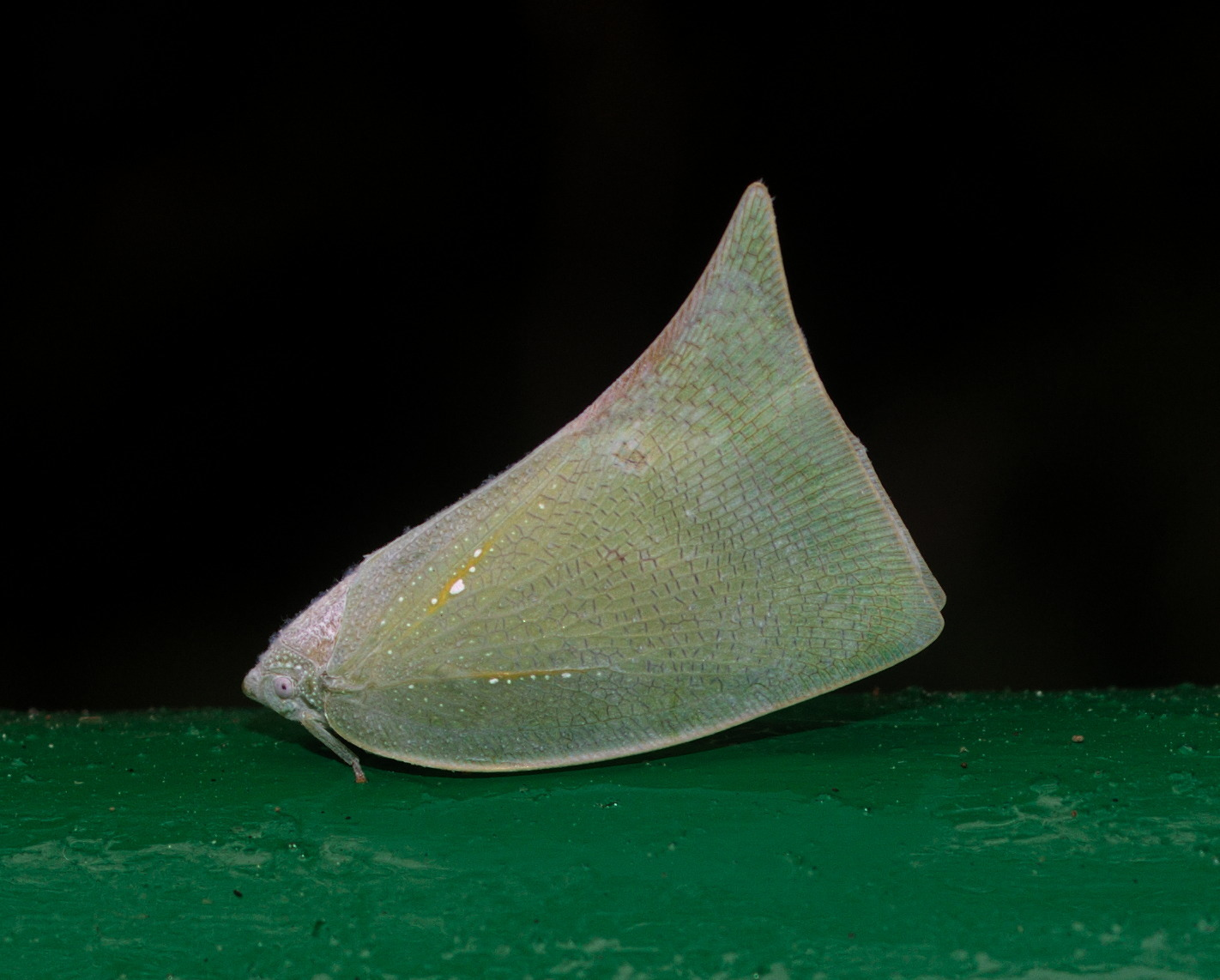
Lawana imitata

Fulgoromorpha Lists on the Web includes:

1. Lawana adscendens (Fabricius, 1803)
2. Lawana arguta (Melichar, 1902)
3. Lawana candida (Fabricius, 1798) – type species (2 subsp.)
4. Lawana conspersa (Walker, 1851)
5. Lawana divisa (Melichar, 1902)
6. Lawana exaltata (Walker, 1862)
7. Lawana exsoleta Melichar, 1902
8. Lawana guttifascia (Melichar, 1902) (3 subsp.)
9. Lawana hyalina (Schmidt, 1904)
10. Lawana imitata (Melichar, 1902)
11. Lawana lineola Walker, 1870
12. Lawana marginata (Walker, 1859)
13. Lawana modesta Distant, 1910
14. Lawana obliqua (Melichar, 1902)
15. Lawana optata (Melichar, 1902) (2 subsp.)
16. Lawana partita (Melichar, 1902)
17. Lawana pryeri (Distant, 1880)
18. Lawana pura (Schmidt, 1904)
19. Lawana radiata (Distant, 1906)
20. Lawana unipunctata (Schmidt, 1904)
21. Lawana usambarae (Melichar, 1905)
