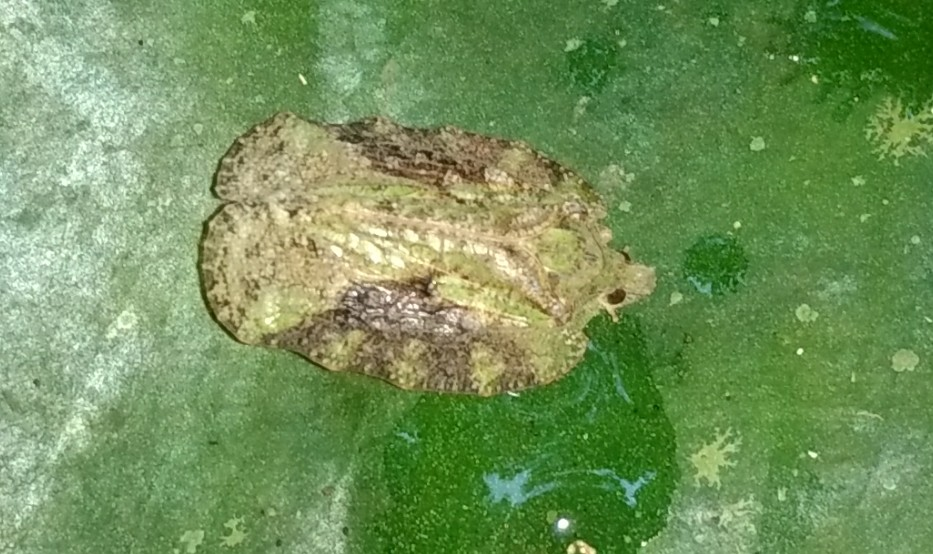
- An unidentified species, Western Ghats

Scientific classification
- Kingdom: Animalia
- Phylum: Arthropoda
- Clade: Pancrustacea
- Class: Insecta
- Order: Hemiptera
- Suborder: Auchenorrhyncha
- Infraorder: Fulgoromorpha
- Family: Flatidae
- Subfamily: Flatoidinae
- Genus: Atracis; Stål, 1866

Type species
- Flata pyralis Guérin-Méneville, 1831

= Atracis =

Genus of true bugs

Atracis is a genus of flatid planthopper with around 60 species distributed in the Oriental Realm and tropical Africa.

- Atracis atkinsoni Distant, 1912)
- Atracis castaneiceps Jacobi, 1917)
- Atracis clypeata Distant, 1914)
- Atracis consanguinea Distant, 1906)
- Atracis conserta Walker, 1857)
- Atracis conspurcata Melichar, 1902)
- Atracis costalis Melichar, 1902
- Atracis crenata Medler, 1991
- Atracis cretacea Distant, 1906)
- Atracis dissimilis Distant, 1914)
- Atracis erosipennis Stål, 1858)
- Atracis facialis Distant, 1912)
- Atracis fasciata Walker, 1870)
- Atracis fimbria Walker, 1851)
- Atracis formasana Jacobi, 1915
- Atracis gibbosa Melichar, 1902
- Atracis greeni Distant, 1912)
- Atracis hainanensis Distant, 1912)
- Atracis haragamensis Distant, 1912)
- Atracis himalayana Distant, 1906)
- Atracis inaequalis Walker, 1858)
- Atracis indica Walker, 1851)
- Atracis insularis Distant, 1906)
- Atracis insurgens Melichar, 1902)
- Atracis intercepta Walker, 1857)
- Atracis jangis Medler, 1999
- Atracis kotoshonis Matsumura, 1940)
- Atracis lurida Melichar, 1902)
- Atracis maculipennis Lallemand, 1939)
- Atracis mendax Melichar, 1902)
- Atracis mira Stål, 1855)
- Atracis moelleri Distant, 1906)
- Atracis mucida Jacobi, 1915
- Atracis munita Melichar, 1902)
- Atracis nalandensis Distant, 1914)
- Atracis nietneri Stål, 1858)
- Atracis nodosa Gerstaecker, 1895)
- Atracis obscura Zia, 1935)
- Atracis obtecta Melichar, 1902)
- Atracis perplaxa Walker, 1858)
- Atracis pruinosa Walker, 1858)
- Atracis puncticeps Walker, 1858)
- Atracis pyralis Guérin-Méneville, 1831)
- Atracis rivularis Distant, 1910)
- Atracis sadeyana Distant, 1912)
- Atracis scissa Melichar, 1902)
- Atracis scripta Melichar, 1902)
- Atracis servis Medler, 1999
- Atracis subrufescens Walker, 1870)
- Atracis surrecta Walker, 1857)
- Atracis surrecta var. a Distant, 1910)
- Atracis tabida Gerstaecker, 1895)
- Atracis termina Medler, 2000
- Atracis tuberculosa Walker, 1851)
- Atracis variegata Lallemand, 1939)
- Atracis vetusta Walker, 1857)
