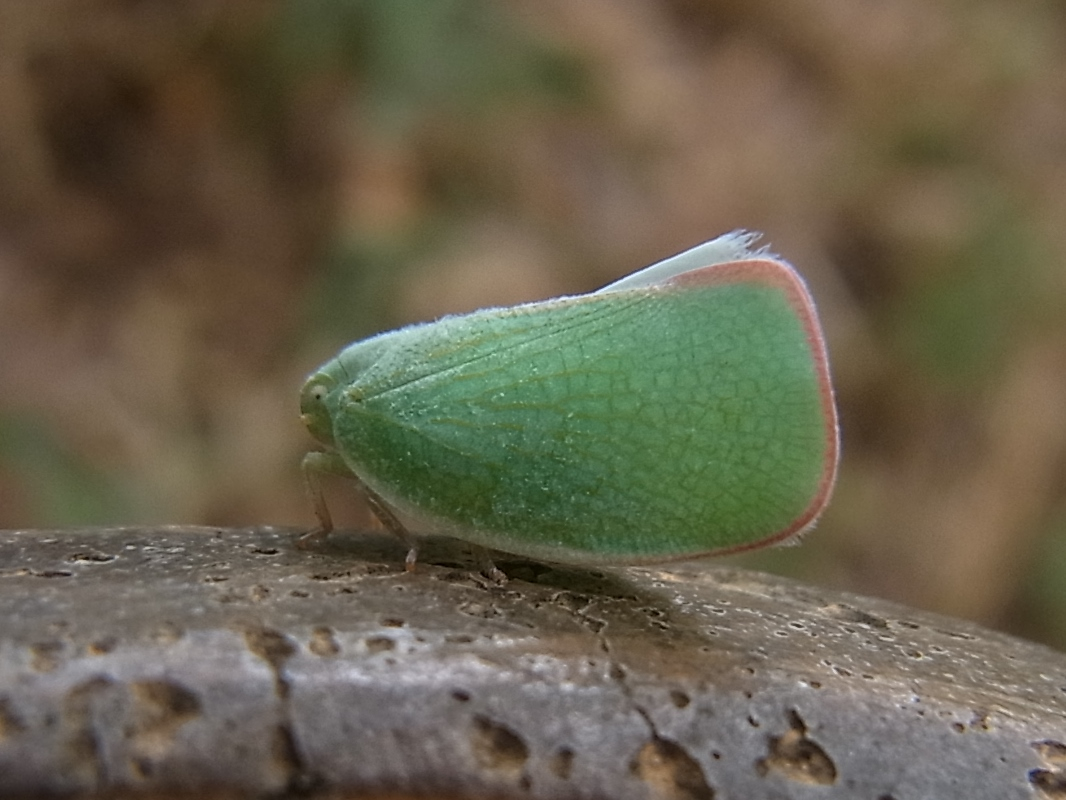
- Geisha distinctissima

Scientific classification
- Domain: Eukaryota
- Kingdom: Animalia
- Phylum: Arthropoda
- Class: Insecta
- Order: Hemiptera
- Suborder: Auchenorrhyncha
- Infraorder: Fulgoromorpha
- Family: Flatidae
- Subfamily: Flatinae
- Genus: Geisha; Kirkaldy, 1900

= Geisha (planthopper) =

Genus of planthoppers

Geisha is a genus of planthoppers in the Flatidae subfamily Flatinae. Species in the genus are all Asian.

== Distribution ==
Species of Geisha are found in China, South Korea, North Korea and Japan,

== Species ==
- Geisha bifurcata Wang, Che & Yuan, 2005
- Geisha distinctissima (Walker, 1858)
- Geisha fangi Medler, 1992
- Geisha qinlingeinsis Wang, Che & Yuan, 2005
- Geisha sauteri Jacobi, 1915
