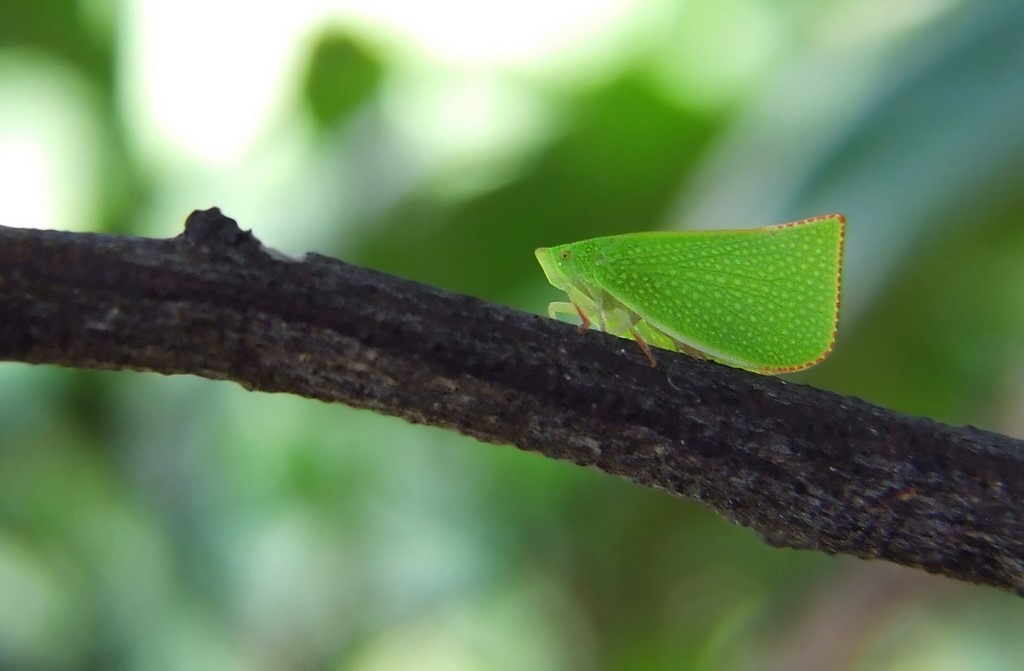
- Siphanta acuta

Scientific classification
- Kingdom: Animalia
- Phylum: Arthropoda
- Class: Insecta
- Order: Hemiptera
- Suborder: Auchenorrhyncha
- Infraorder: Fulgoromorpha
- Family: Flatidae
- Tribe: Flatini
- Genus: Siphanta (Stal, 1860)

Species
- See text

Synonyms
- Lombokia (Distant, 1910); Parasalurnis (Distant, 1910); Phalainesthes (Kirkaldy, 1899); Siphantoides (Distant, 1910)

= Siphanta =

Genus of planthoppers

Siphanta is a genus of planthoppers in the family Flatidae.

== Description ==
In adults of Siphanta, the frons is slightly convex to flat, has a median longitudinal carina and either lacks lateral carinae or these are very short. The vertex meets the frons at a carinate margin. The pronotum is flat medially and has lateral carinae that curve posterolaterally and do not reach the posterior margin. The posterior margin of the pronotum is broadly concave. The mesonotum is also flat medially (occasionally with a faint median carina) and has two lateral carinae. The forewing (tegmen) is triangular, lacks apical lines and has a sutural angle that ranges from obtusely rounded to slightly acute. The tibia of the hind leg bears one spine.

== Diet ==
Like other planthoppers, Siphanta are herbivores. Siphanta acuta is polyphagous, meaning it feeds on a wide range of plants. It is a pest of banana, citrus, coffee, guava, macadamia and various ornamental plants. Siphanta gregaria feeds on Cordia cylindrostachya.

== Distribution ==
Most species in this genus occur in Australia, with the exception of S. expatria from New Guinea. Siphanta acuta and S. patruelis have been introduced to other countries.

== Species ==
- Siphanta acuta (Walker, 1851)
- Siphanta acutipenins (Kirkaldy, 1906)
- Siphanta alboconspersa (Distant, 1910)
- Siphanta angularis (Fletcher, 1985)
- Siphanta angustata (Fletcher, 1985)
- Siphanta anomala (Jacobi, 1928)
- Siphanta atomaria (Walker, 1858)
- Siphanta bifida (Fletcher, 1985)
- Siphanta breviceps, synonym of Siphanta hebes
- Siphanta compacta (Fletcher, 1985)
- Siphanta constricta (Fletcher, 1985)
- Siphanta eberhardi (Fletcher, 1985)
- Siphanta expatria (Fletcher, 1985)
- Siphanta fusca (Fletcher, 1985)
- Siphanta galeata (Kirkaldy, 1906)
- Siphanta gallowayi (Fletcher, 1985)
- Siphanta glauca (Fletcher, 1985)
- Siphanta granulata (Kirkaldy, 1906)
- Siphanta granulicollis (Stsl, 1859)
- Siphanta gregaria (Jacobi, 1928)
- Siphanta griseoviridis (Fletcher, 1985)
- Siphanta hackeri (Fletcher, 1985)
- Siphanta hebes (Walker, 1851) (Green planthopper)
- Siphanta insularis, synonym of Phyllyphanta producta
- Siphanta intricata, synonym of Ormenis intricata
- Siphanta javana, synonym of Siphanta patruelis
- Siphanta kurandae (Fletcher, 1985)
- Siphanta lucindae (Kirkaldy, 1906)
- Siphanta luteolineata (Fletcher, 1985)
- Siphanta lynae (Fletcher, 1985)
- Siphanta minuta (Fabricius, 1775)
- Siphanta montana (Fletcher, 1985)
- Siphanta munda, synonym of Euphanta munda
- Siphanta nubecula (Jacobi, 1928)
- Siphanta occidentalis (Fletcher, 1985)
- Siphanta parva (Fletcher, 1985)
- Siphanta patruelis (Stal, 1859)
- Siphanta peracuta (Fletcher, 1985)
- Siphanta recurva (Fletcher, 1985)
- Siphanta roseicincta (Walker, 1862)
- Siphanta rubra (Schmidt, 1904)
- Siphanta sensilis, synonym of Siphanta minuta
- Siphanta similis (Fletcher, 1985)
- Siphanta solitaria (Fletcher, 1985)
- Siphanta stigma, synonym of Siphanta hebes
- Siphanta striata (Fletcher, 2002)
- Siphanta subgranulosa (Kirkaldy, 1906)
- Siphanta tasmanica (Fletcher, 1985)
- Siphanta thambeos (Fletcher, 1985)
- Siphanta toga, synonym of Siphanta patruelis
- Siphanta trimaculata (Distant, 1910)
- Siphanta tropica (Fletcher, 1985)
- Siphanta unicolor (Walker, 1851)
