= Paraflata =

Scientific classification
- Kingdom: Animalia
- Phylum: Arthropoda
- Clade: Pancrustacea
- Class: Insecta
- Order: Hemiptera
- Suborder: Auchenorrhyncha
- Infraorder: Fulgoromorpha
- Family: Flatidae
- Tribe: Phromniini
- Genus: Paraflata; Melichar, 1901

Species
- Paraflata dewalschei (Lallemand, 1933); Paraflata kingdomi Distant, 1910; Paraflata masoalae Swierczewski, Bourgoin & Stroinski, 2016; Paraflata seminigra (Stål, 1866); Paraflata unispinosa Swierczewski, Bourgoin & Stroinski, 2016

Genus of planthoppers

Paraflata is a genus of planthoppers in the family Flatidae. It was first described by Leopold Melichar in 1901. Species in the genus are found on Madagascar.

== Parasitism ==
Paraflata species are parasitized by the larvae of Epipyropidae moths.
