= Microflata =

Scientific classification
- Kingdom: Animalia
- Phylum: Arthropoda
- Clade: Pancrustacea
- Class: Insecta
- Order: Hemiptera
- Suborder: Auchenorrhyncha
- Infraorder: Fulgoromorpha
- Family: Flatidae
- Genus: Microflata; Melichar, 1902
- Species: M. stictica

Binomial name
- Microflata stictica Melichar, 1902

Genus of planthoppers

Microflata is a genus of planthoppers in the family Flatidae, established by Leopold Melichar in 1902. It contains only one species, Microflata stictica.
