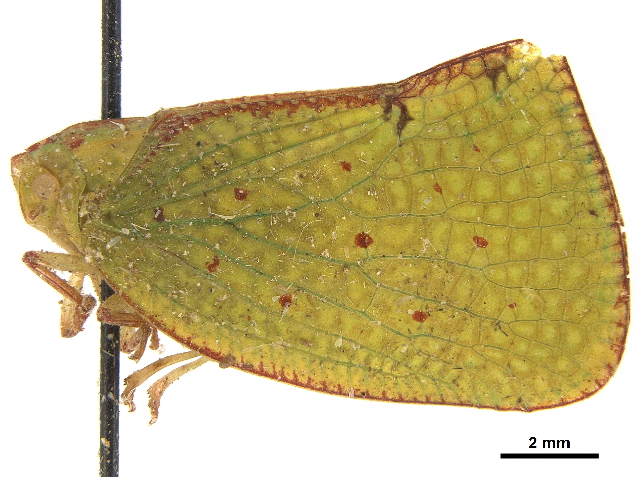

Scientific classification
- Kingdom: Animalia
- Phylum: Arthropoda
- Class: Insecta
- Order: Hemiptera
- Suborder: Auchenorrhyncha
- Infraorder: Fulgoromorpha
- Family: Flatidae
- Tribe: Nephesini
- Genus: Neomelicharia; Kirkaldy, 1903

= Neomelicharia =

Genus of planthoppers

Neomelicharia is a genus of planthoppers belonging to the family Flatidae.

The species of this genus are found in Indonesia.

== Species ==
- Neomelicharia centralis (Melichar, 1902)
- Neomelicharia consociata (Walker, 1862)
- Neomelicharia cruentata (Fabricius, 1803)
- Neomelicharia diversa (Melichar, 1902)
- Neomelicharia guttulata (Stål, 1863)
- Neomelicharia handschini Lallemand, 1935
- Neomelicharia indicata (Melichar, 1902)
- Neomelicharia lucentis Medler, 1999
- Neomelicharia punctulata (Melichar, 1902)
- Neomelicharia roseola Medler, 1999
- Neomelicharia sparsa (Fabricius, 1803)
- Neomelicharia tripunctata (Melichar, 1902)
- Neomelicharia variegata (Schmidt, 1904)
