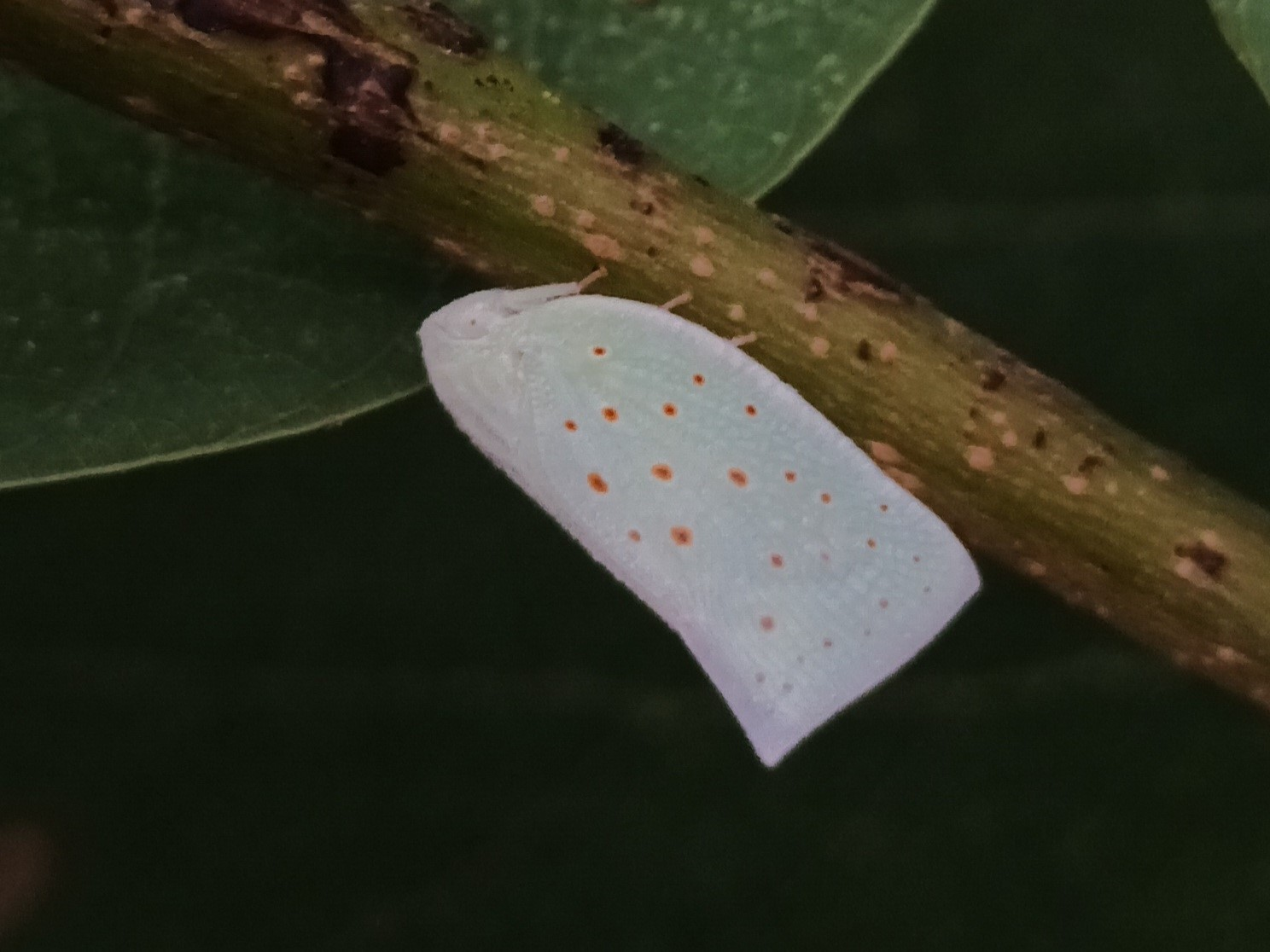
- Flata stellaris

Scientific classification
- Kingdom: Animalia
- Phylum: Arthropoda
- Class: Insecta
- Order: Hemiptera
- Suborder: Auchenorrhyncha
- Infraorder: Fulgoromorpha
- Family: Flatidae
- Subfamily: Flatinae
- Tribe: Flatini
- Genus: Flata; Fabricius, 1798

Synonyms
- Flatta Fabricius, 1798 (lapsus)

= Flata =

Genus of planthoppers

External image
- Images at iNaturalist

Flata is the type genus of planthoppers in the family Flatidae and tribe Flatini (subtribe Flatina), erected by Johan Christian Fabricius in 1798. Species are recorded from subtropical and tropical Asia including India, China, Indochina and Malesia (but records are probably incomplete).

== Status and description ==
The genus Flata has historically included more than two hundred species, many of which have subsequently been transferred to other genera and families. Three non-oriental species currently included here are "of uncertain generic affinity".

Flata are medium to large planthoppers, from 12-25 mm in length. The head is narrower than pronotum and wider than long, with lateral margins raised moderately and characteristic carinae. The antennae are short with tubular 1st and 2nd segments (segment 2 is longer). Ocelli are present.

The pronotum and mesonotum of the thorax is moderately humped, with the former bluntly triangular and a convex anterior margin; the mesonotum is large and shield-like, with three longitudinal carinae. The forewings are subtriangular with an elongated convex costal margin and characteristic wing veination. The metatibia of the legs bear two lateral spines.

== Species ==
Fulgoromorpha Lists on the Web includes:

1. Flata coromandelica (Spinola, 1839)
2. Flata doryca Boisduval, 1835
3. Flata erubescens Breddin, 1900
4. Flata ferrugata Fabricius, 1803
5. Flata guttularis (Walker, 1857)
6. Flata lyncea (Fabricius, 1803)
7. Flata minuta (Fabricius, 1775)
8. Flata nava Say, 1830
9. Flata orientala Peng, Fletcher & Zhang, 2012
10. Flata pinga Peng, Fletcher & Zhang, 2012
11. Flata punctipennis (Distant, 1910)
12. Flata rostrata (Montrouzier, 1855)
13. Flata sinuata Peng, Fletcher & Zhang, 2012
14. Flata stellaris (Walker, 1851)
  - type species (as Cicada ocellata Fabricius, 1775 then Poeciloptera stellaris Walker, 1851)
15. Flata taiwana Peng, Fletcher & Zhang, 2012
16. Flata tripunctata (Fabricius, 1781)
17. Flata truncata Peng, Fletcher & Zhang, 2012

=== Subgenus Flata (Erubescens) ===
Auth. Breddin, 1900 – Malesia

1. Flata labeculata Distant, 1892
2. Flata punctipennis (Distant, 1910)
