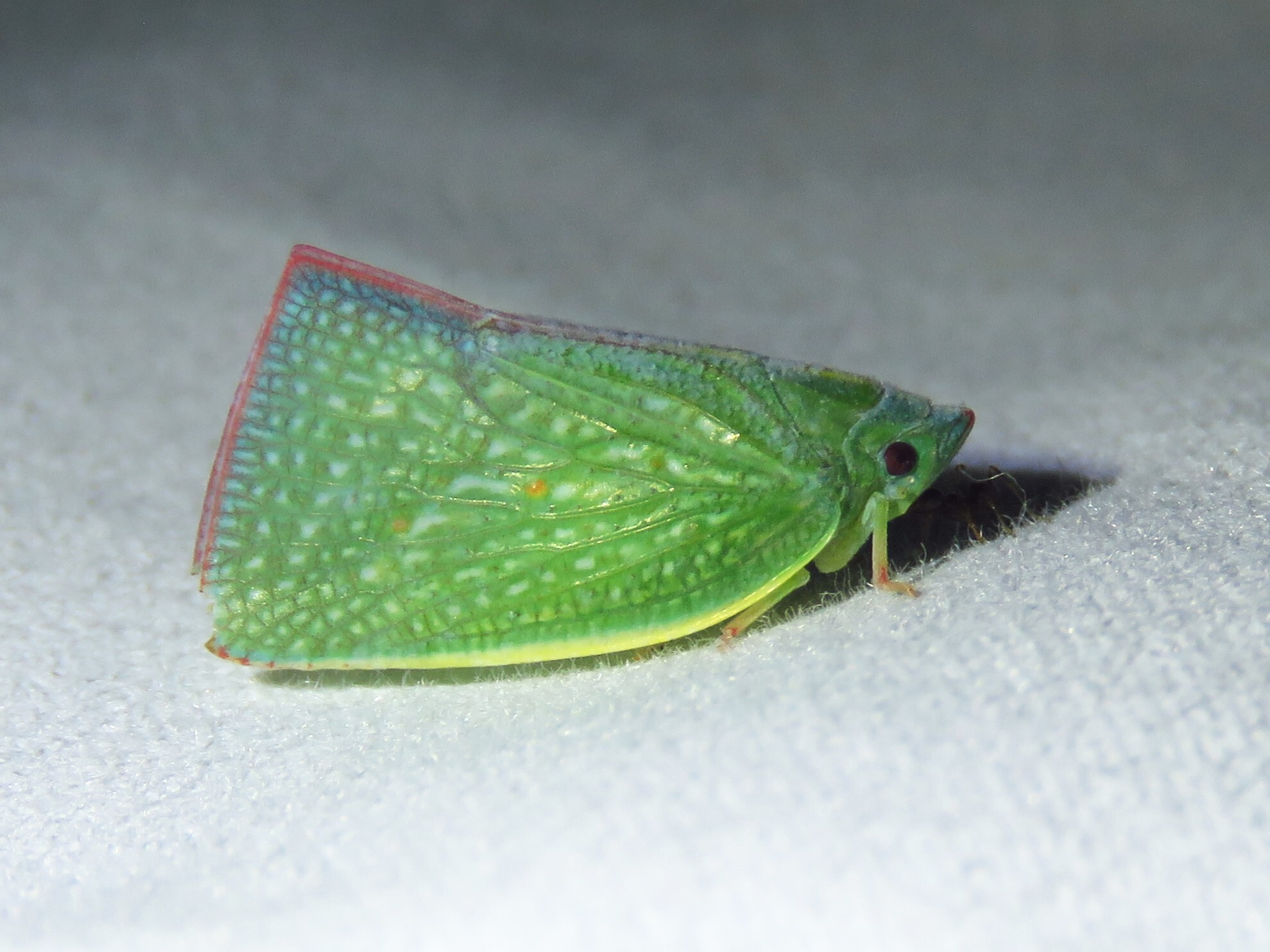
- Colgar tricolor

Scientific classification
- Kingdom: Animalia
- Phylum: Arthropoda
- Class: Insecta
- Order: Hemiptera
- Suborder: Auchenorrhyncha
- Infraorder: Fulgoromorpha
- Family: Flatidae
- Genus: Colgar; Kirkaldy, 1900

= Colgar =

Genus of insects

Colgar is a genus of planthoppers.

== Taxonomy ==
Colgar contains the following species:

- Colgar manor
- Colgar bespectum
- Colgar farinosa
- Colgar chlorospilum
- Colgar orisum
- Colgar acumunata
- Colgar rufostigmatum
- Colgar surrectum
- Colgar tricolor
- Colgar elatum
- Colgar peracutum
