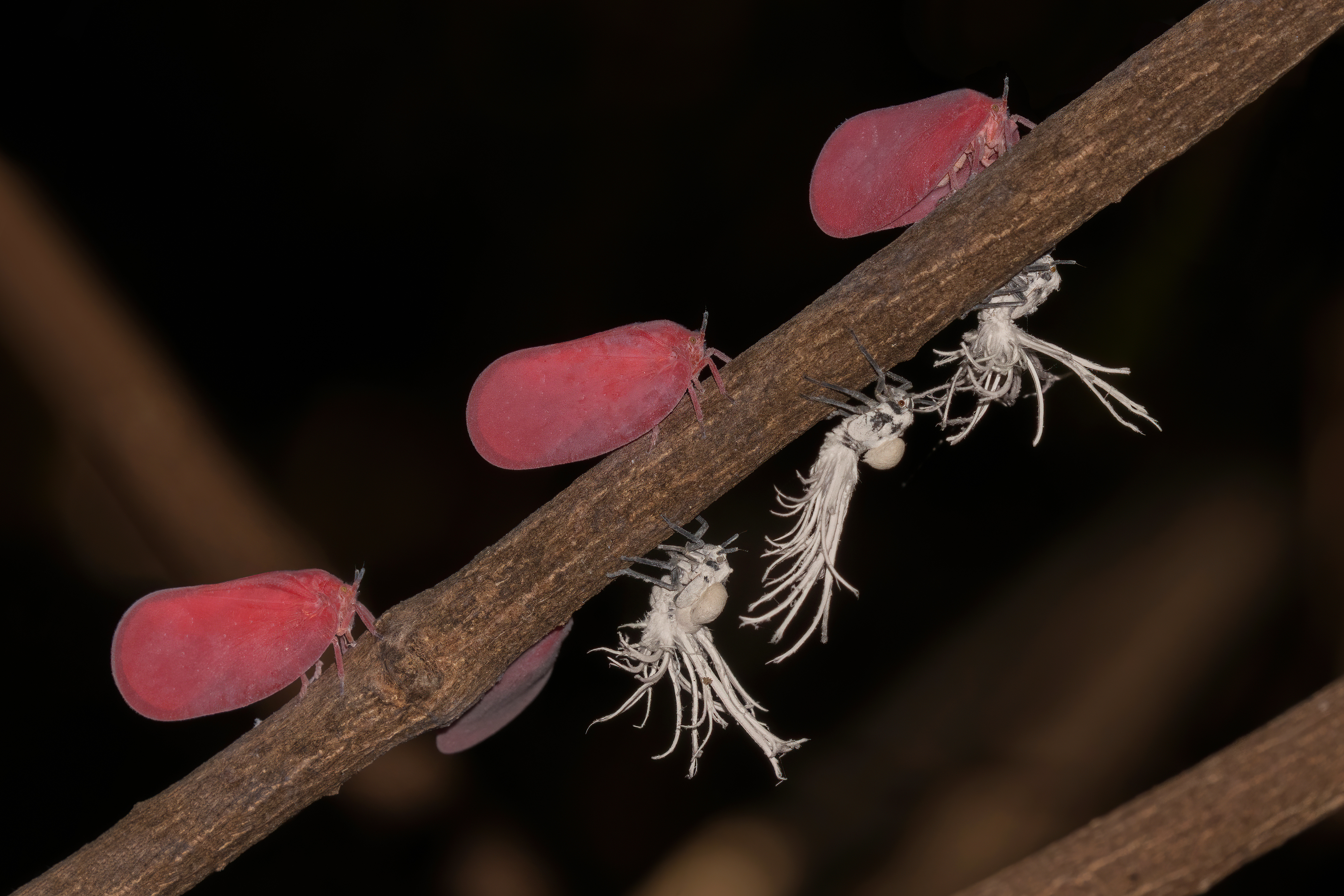
- adult bugs and nymphs (Flatida rosea); Ankarana Reserve, Madagascar

Scientific classification
- Kingdom: Animalia
- Phylum: Arthropoda
- Class: Insecta
- Order: Hemiptera
- Suborder: Auchenorrhyncha
- Infraorder: Fulgoromorpha
- Superfamily: Fulgoroidea
- Family: Flatidae; Spinola, 1839

Subfamilies
- Flatoidinae; Flatinae

= Flatidae =

Family of planthoppers

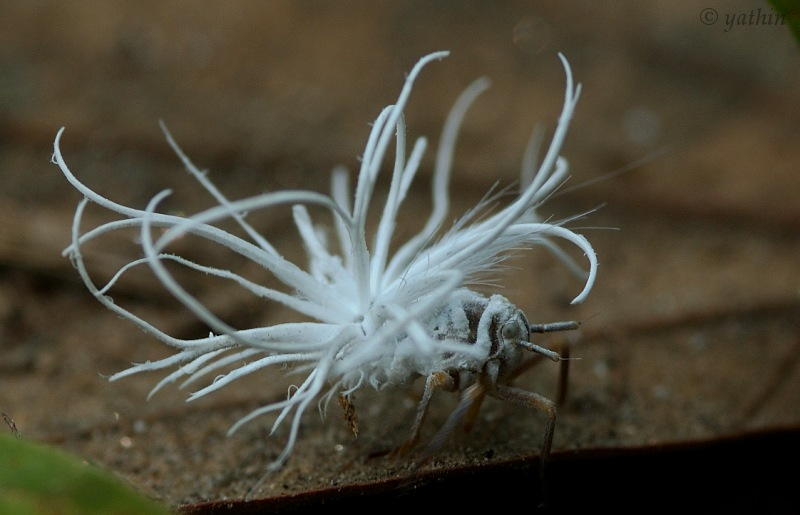
Flatid nymph from Assam, India

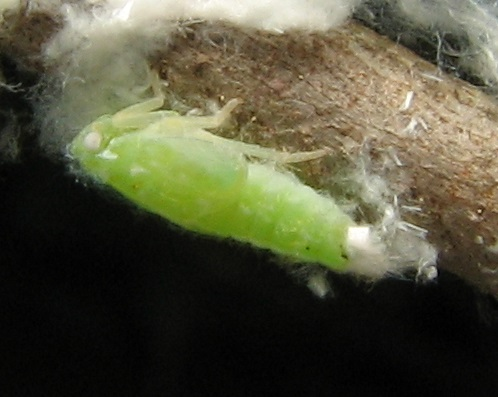
Ormenoides venusta nymph

A small clip showing a Flatid nymph of about 4 to 5mm walking

Flatidae are a family of fulgoroid planthoppers. They are cosmopolitan in distribution and are distinguished from others in the superfamily by a combination of characters. Like all other planthoppers, they suck phloem sap of plants. Some species are known to communicate with vibrations through the plant stems. Communication may be with mates, or with ants that tend the nymphs, protecting them and gathering honeydew secretions. Adults of some species have brightly coloured forewings which are tougher and known as tegmina unlike the membranous hindwings which are used for flight. Although a few can be identified by their coloration, most species requires dissection and examination under a microscope with access to literature on already described species.

There are two subfamilies within the family. In the subfamily Flatinae, the body of adults is flattened laterally and the tegmina are tent-like. In the Flatoidinae, the body is not laterally compressed and the tegmina are not as tent-like and sometimes held horizontally. The wing venation is distinctive in that the veins in the anal region are nodose, and the costal area has numerous cross veins. The antennae are small and the first segment is collar-like and small. The second segment is longer and ends in a bulge and a flagellum arises from it. They have two ocelli. Nymphs have a tail of waxy filaments.

== Subfamilies and genera ==
Genera within the family Flatidae include:

=== Flatinae ===
Auth.: Spinola, 1839; selected genera:

tribe Ceryniini Distant, 1906

- Adelidoria Metcalf, 1952
- Adexia Melichar, 1901
- Bythopsyrna Melichar, 1901
- Cerynia Stål, 1862

tribe Flatini Spinola, 1839

- subtribe Flatina Spinola, 1839
  - Flata Fabricius, 1798
  - Flatomorpha Melichar, 1901
- subtribe Lawanina Melichar, 1923
  - Cromna Walker, 1857
  - Lawana Distant, 1906
  - Oryxa Melichar, 1901
- subtribe Phyllyphantina Melichar, 1923
  - Paracromna Melichar, 1901
  - Phyllyphanta Amyot & Audinet-Serville, 1843
- subtribe Scarpantina Melichar, 1923
  - Scarpanta Stål, 1862
  - Scarpantina Melichar, 1901
- subtribe Siphantina Melichar, 1923
  - Siphanta Stål, 1862

tribe Nephesini Distant, 1906

- subtribe Cryptoflatina Melichar, 1923
  - Cryptoflata Melichar, 1901
  - Geisha Kirkaldy, 1900
  - Metcalfa Caldwell & Martorell, 1951
  - Ormenaria Metcalf & Bruner, 1948
  - Ormenoides Melichar, 1923
- subtribe Nephesina Distant, 1906
  - Neomelicharia Kirkaldy, 1903
  - Nephesa Amyot & Audinet-Serville, 1843
- subtribe Phaedolina Melichar, 1923
  - Phaedolus Karsch, 1890
- subtribe Pseudoflatina Melichar, 1923
  - Caesonia Stål, 1866
  - Colgar Kirkaldy, 1900
  - Colgaroides Distant, 1910 - Planthoppers
  - Dalapax Amyot & Audinet-Serville, 1843
  - Gyaria Stål, 1862
  - Gyariella Schmidt, 1924
  - Pauliana Lallemand, 1950
  - Rhinophantia Melichar, 1901

tribe Phantiini Melichar, 1923

- Mesophantia Melichar, 1901
- Microflata Melichar, 1901
- Phantia Fieber, 1866

tribe Phromniini Distant, 1906

- Dermoflata Melichar, 1901
- Flatida White, 1846 (= Phromnia Stål, 1862)
- Flatina Melichar, 1901
- Flatosoma Melichar, 1901
- Paraflata Melichar, 1901
- Poeciloflata Melichar, 1901

tribe Poekillopterini Kirkaldy, 1907

- Poekilloptera Latreille, 1796

tribe Selizini Distant, 1906

- Jamella Kirkaldy, 1906 (J. australiae, or pandanus planthopper, pest to Pandanus tectorius)
- Seliza Stål, 1862

tribe Sisciini Melichar, 1923

- Siscia Stål, 1870

=== Flatoidinae ===
Auth.: Melichar, 1901

- Atracis Stål, 1866
- Atracodes Melichar, 1902
- Bochara Distant, 1906
- Cerfennia Stål, 1870
- Cisatra Melichar, 1923
- Dendrona Melichar, 1923
- Flataloides Metcalf, 1938
- Flatarina Metcalf & Bruner, 1948
- Flatarissa Metcalf & Bruner, 1948
- Flatoides Guérin-Ménéville, 1844
- Flatoidessa Melichar, 1923
- Flatoidinus Melichar, 1923
- Flatosaria Melichar, 1923
- Franciscus Distant, 1910
- Gaja Distant, 1906
- Lichena Melichar, 1901
- Lichenopsis Schmidt, 1912
- Melichitona Metcalf, 1952
- Paraflatoides Melichar, 1923
- Phalaenomorpha Amyot & Audinet-Serville, 1843
- Porophloeus Melichar, 1902
- Pseudoflatoides Metcalf, 1938
- Uxantis Stål, 1870
- Uysanus Distant, 1908

=== incertae sedis ===
- Afrexoma Fennah, 1976
- Afrophantia Fennah, 1958
- Afrormenis Fennah, 1958
- Amasha Medler, 1992
- Anatracis Fennah, 1958
- Anzora Medler, 1986
- Bahuflata Dlabola, 1979
- Betracis Medler, 1988
- Boretsis Medler, 1996
- Brysora Medler, 2000
- Budginmaya Fletcher & Moir, 2009
- Catracis Medler, 1988
- Comnar Medler, 1988
- Cromgar Medler, 2000
- Cromnella Fennah, 1969
- Cryomna Medler, 2000
- Cyclopterum Gnezdilov & O'Brien, 2014
- Demina Medler, 2000
- Desanta Medler, 2000
- Diastracis Medler, 1988
- Dixamflata Stroinski, Malenovský & Swierczewski, 2016
- Dworena Medler, 1986
- Erotana Medler, 2000
- Eugyaria Synave, 1962
- Falcophantis Fletcher, 1988
- Garanta Medler, 2000
- Humgar Medler, 2001
- Ijagar Medler, 2000
- Insulume Medler, 1999
- Karrama Medler, 1988
- Kesaflata Stroinski, Malenovsky & Swierczewski, 2016
- Kirkamflata Swierczewski, Malenovsky & Stroinski, 2014
- Lasura Medler, 1992
- Lemaria Medler, 1988
- Madoxychara Stroinski & Swierczewski, 2013
- Malleja Medler, 1990
- Menora Medler, 1999
- Metcracis Medler, 1993
- Miniscia Medler, 1991
- Narowalenus Shakila, 1991
- Neocalauria Synave, 1957
- Neomistaria Yang & Chen, 2015
- Neosephena Medler, 2000
- Neovariata Shakila, 1984
- Ortracis Medler, 1996
- Paracalauria Synave, 1962
- Parasiphanta Fletcher, 1988
- Perinetella Synave, 1956
- Persepolia Dlabola & Safavi, 1972
- Peyrierasus Stroinski & Swierczewski, 2013
- Phaiophantia Lindberg, 1958
- Planata Medler, 1999
- Riodeorolix Lindberg, 1956
- Safroka Medler, 2001
- Samcerus Medler, 1993
- Saurana Medler, 1992
- Scarpuna Medler, 2006
- Shadaka Medler, 2000
- Soares Stroiński & Świerczewski, 2012
- Sogalabana Stroiński & Świerczewski, 2014
- Sosephena Medler, 1990
- Staliana Medler, 1988
- Stenume Medler, 1999
- Talopsus Medler, 1989
- Taparella Medler, 1989
- Tisia Dlabola, 1981
- Tormenis Medler, 1999
- Trisephena Medler, 1990
- Umidena Medler, 1992
- Walena Medler, 1999
