= Leopold Melichar =

Czech entomologist (1855–1924)

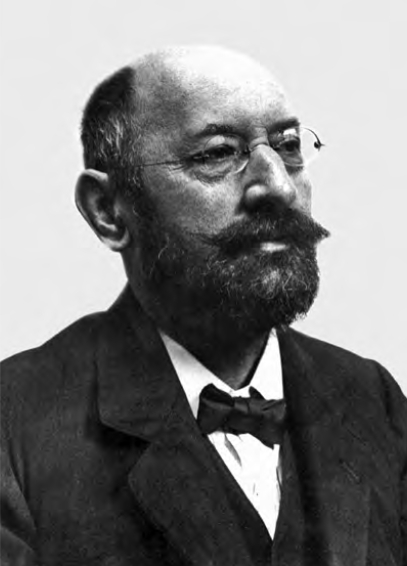
- Born: 5 December 1856; Brno, Moravia, Austrian Empire
- Died: 2 September 1924 (aged 67); Brno, Czechoslovakia
- Occupations: entomologist, physician
- Known for: Studying the taxonomy of leafhoppers

Leopold Melichar (5 December 1856 – 2 September 1924) was a Czech entomologist and physician who specialized in the taxonomy of the leafhoppers.

== Life ==
Melichar was born on 5 December 1856 in Brno, Moravia, Austrian Empire. He graduated from a gymnasium in Brno and then he studied medicine at Charles University in Prague, from which he graduated in 1881.

He began practice in Vienna in 1888. He became an official in the ministry of health and in his spare time he took an interest in insects. Through the influence of Ladislav Duda he began to specialize in the leafhoppers, examining the collections of Jindřich Uzel from Sri Lanka. Melichar returned to live in Brno in 1912 and during World War I he headed the local Red Cross Hospital. Melichar also collected in North Africa, Spain and around the Mediterranean and his collections were bequeathed to the Moravian Museum. Most of the taxa described by Melichar were based on external morphology and did not involve examination of the genitalia.

Melichar died on 2 September 1924 in Brno. He was buried at the Brno Central Cemetery.
