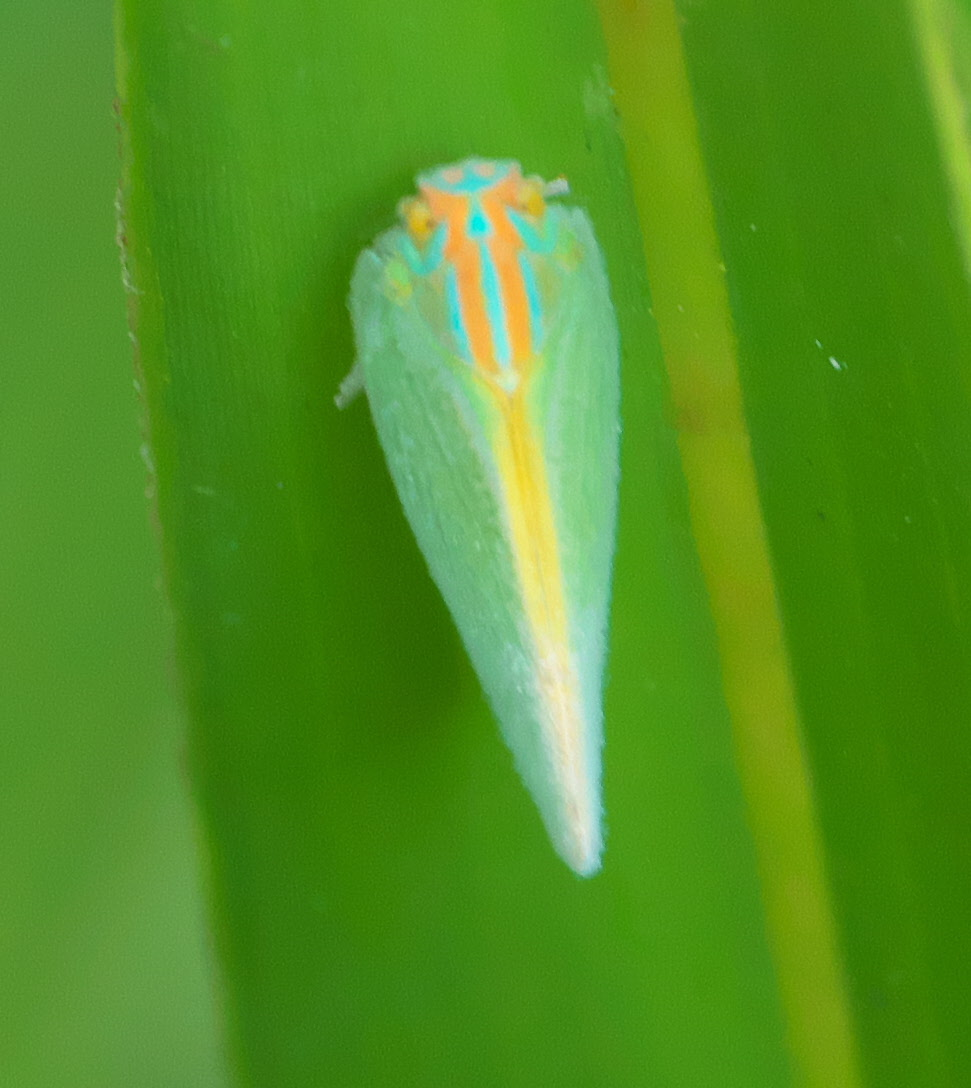

Scientific classification
- Kingdom: Animalia
- Phylum: Arthropoda
- Class: Insecta
- Order: Hemiptera
- Suborder: Auchenorrhyncha
- Infraorder: Fulgoromorpha
- Family: Flatidae
- Genus: Ormenaria
- Species: O. rufifascia

Binomial name
- Ormenaria rufifascia (Walker, 1851)

= Ormenaria rufifascia =

Species of true bug

Ormenaria rufifascia, the palm flatid planthopper, is a species of flatid planthopper in the family Flatidae.

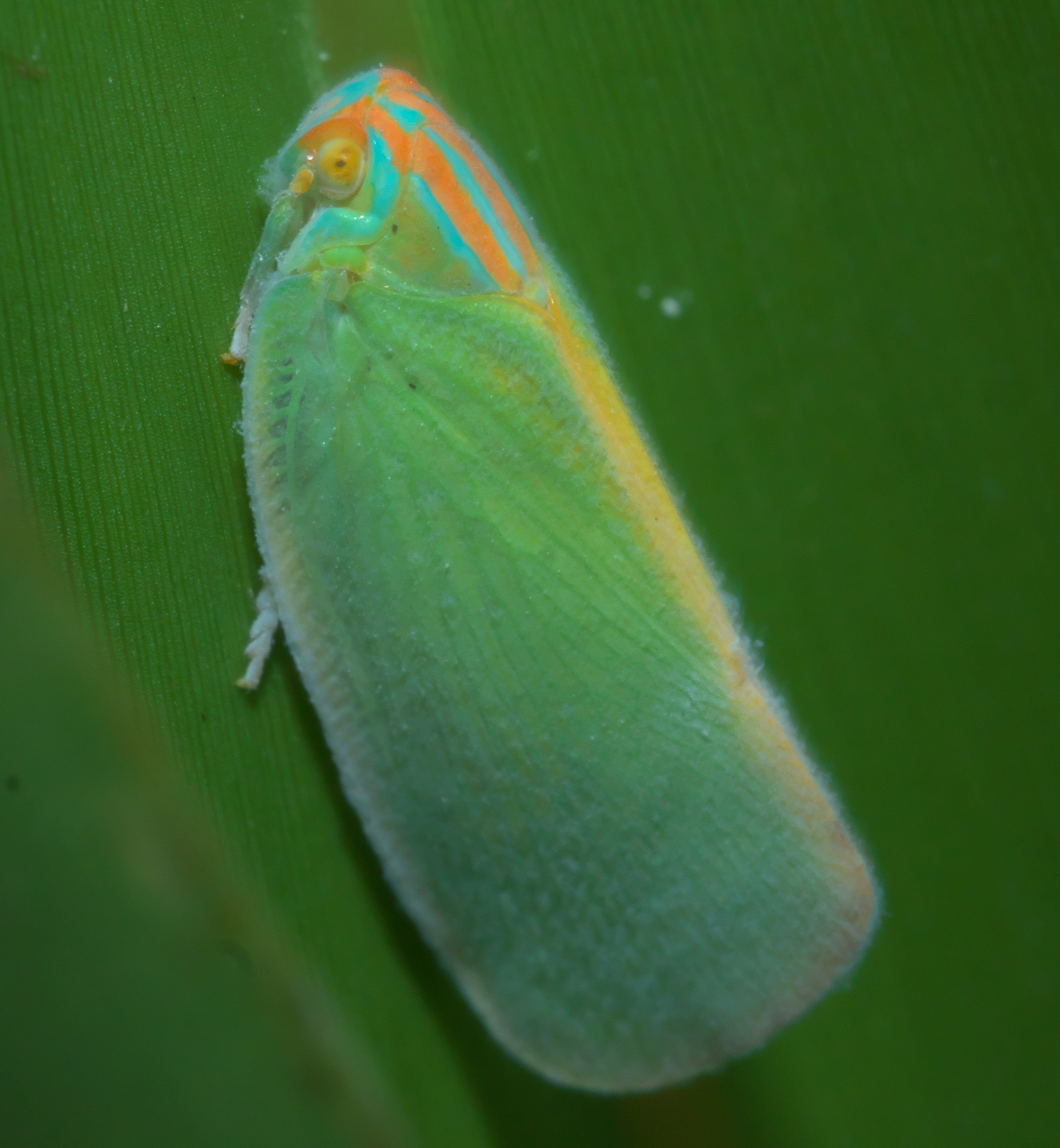
Palm flatid planthopper, Ormenaria rufifascia
