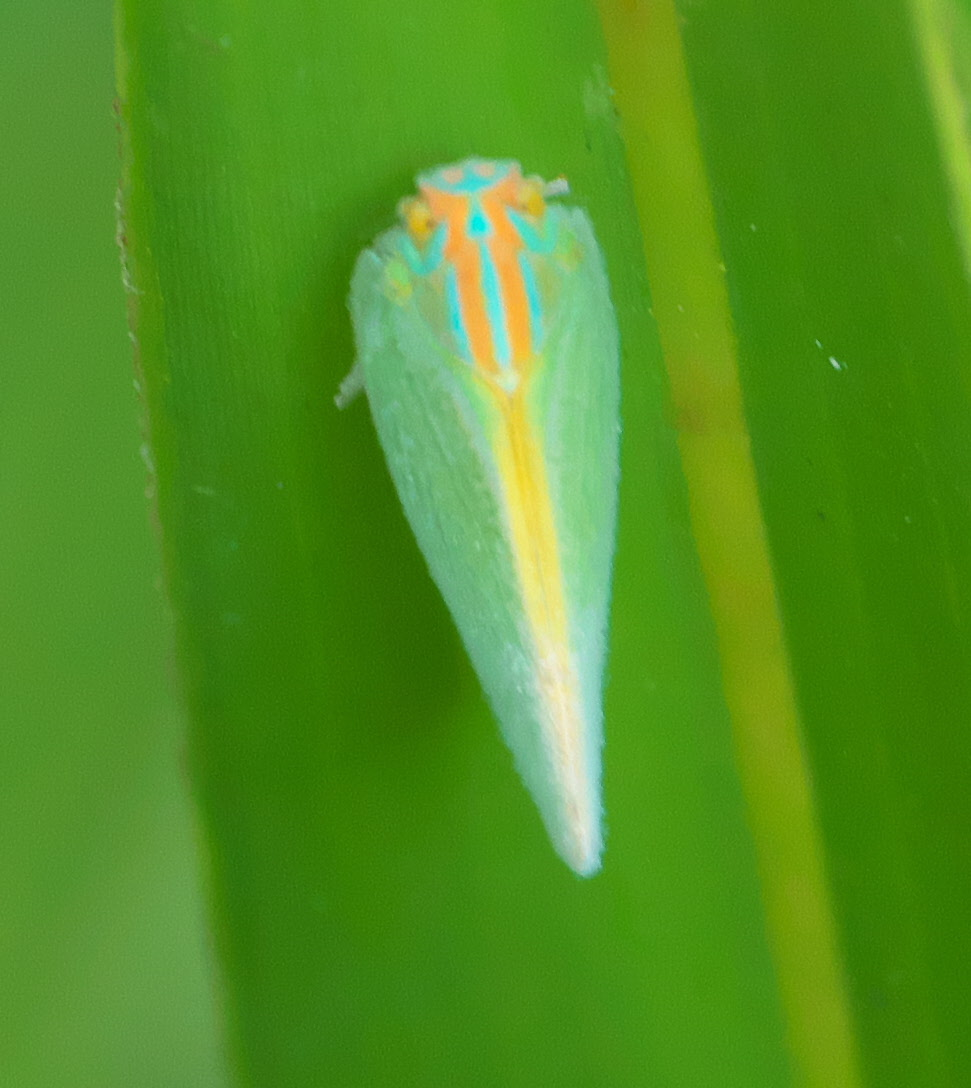
- Ormenaria rufifascia

Scientific classification
- Kingdom: Animalia
- Phylum: Arthropoda
- Class: Insecta
- Order: Hemiptera
- Suborder: Auchenorrhyncha
- Infraorder: Fulgoromorpha
- Family: Flatidae
- Tribe: Nephesini
- Genus: Ormenaria; Metcalf & Bruner, 1948

= Ormenaria =

Genus of planthoppers

Ormenaria is a genus of North American flatid planthoppers in the family Flatidae. There are at least two described species in Ormenaria.

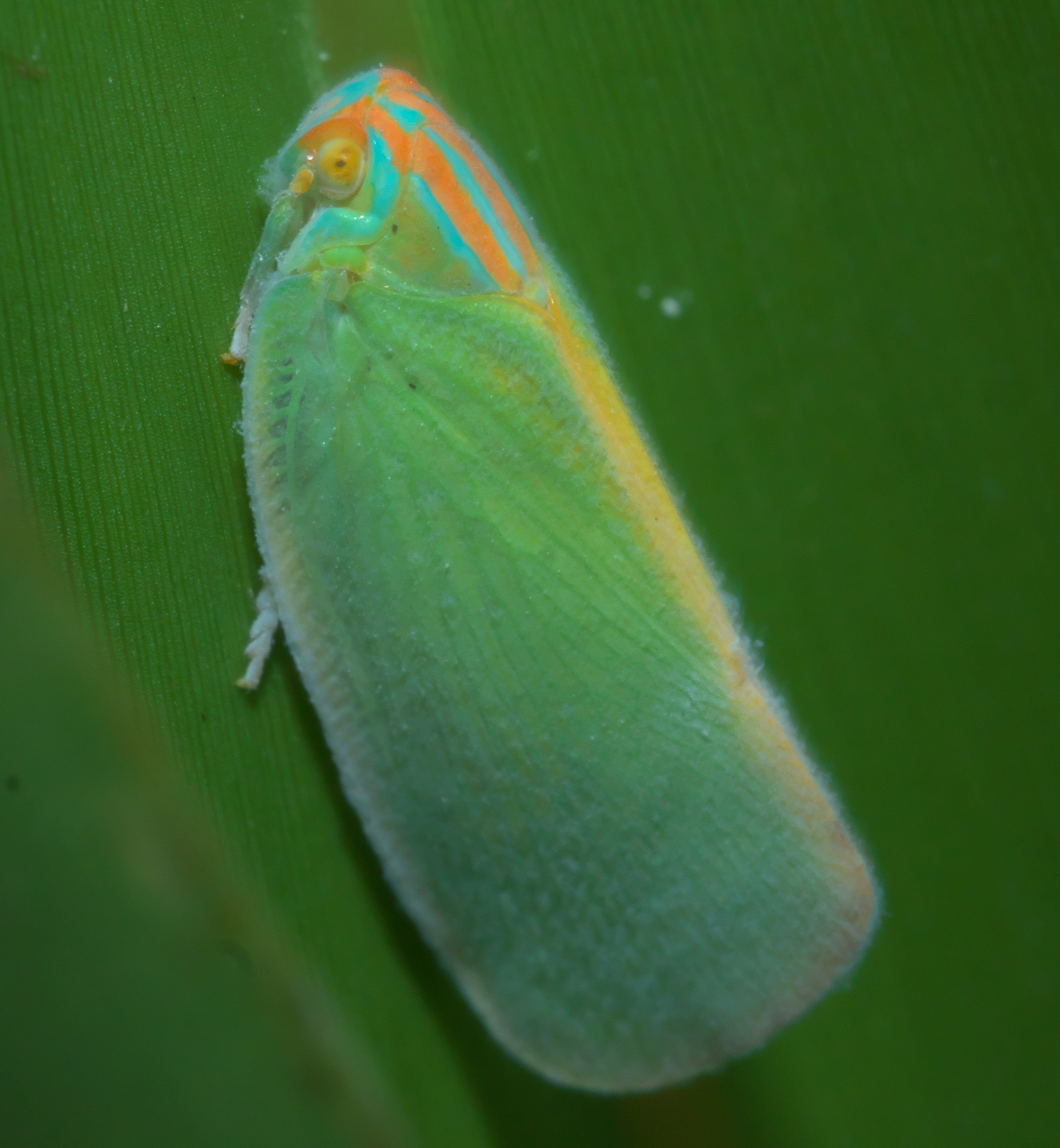
Ormenaria rufifascia

== Species ==
These two species belong to the genus Ormenaria:

- Ormenaria barberi (Van Duzee, 1912)^{c g b}
- Ormenaria rufifascia (Walker, 1851)^{c g b} (palm flatid planthopper)

Data sources: i = ITIS, c = Catalogue of Life, g = GBIF, b = Bugguide.net
