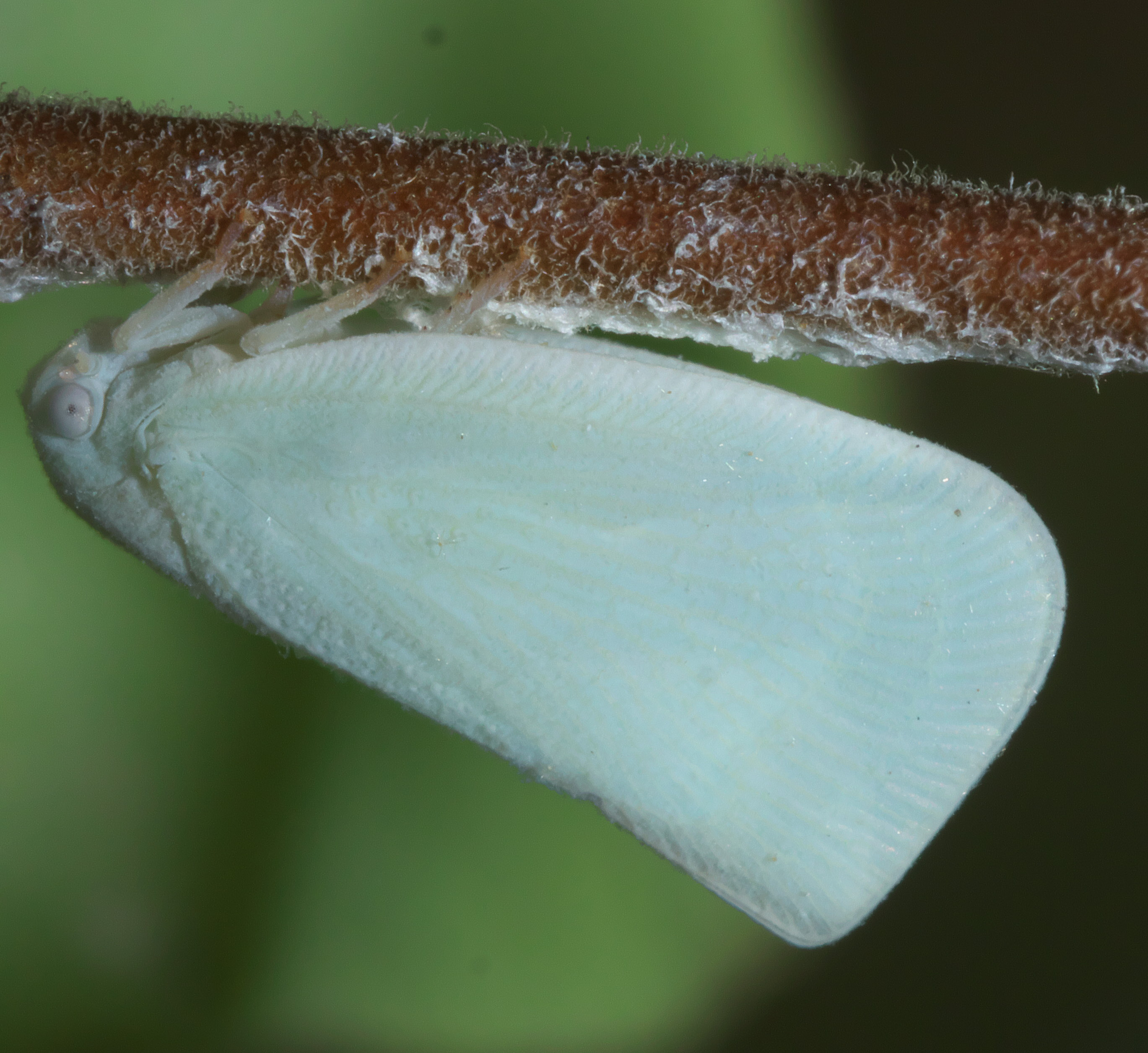
- Flatormenis proxima

Scientific classification
- Kingdom: Animalia
- Phylum: Arthropoda
- Clade: Pancrustacea
- Class: Insecta
- Order: Hemiptera
- Suborder: Auchenorrhyncha
- Infraorder: Fulgoromorpha
- Family: Flatidae
- Tribe: Nephesini
- Genus: Flatormenis; Melichar, 1923

= Flatormenis =

Genus of planthoppers

Flatormenis is a genus of flatid planthoppers in the family Flatidae from North and central America. There are about 15 described species in Flatormenis.

== Species ==
- Flatormenis albescens (Fowler, 1900)^{c g}
- Flatormenis albipennis (Van Duzee, 1907)^{c g}
- Flatormenis dolabrata (Fowler, 1900)^{c g}
- Flatormenis fumata (Schmidt, 1904)^{c g}
- Flatormenis fusca (Melichar, 1902)^{c g}
- Flatormenis glaucescens (Walker, 1858)^{c g}
- Flatormenis gliseoalba (Fowler, 1900)^{c g}
- Flatormenis griseoalba (Fowler, 1900)^{c g}
- Flatormenis inferior (Fowler, 1900)^{c g}
- Flatormenis panamensis (Schmidt, 1904)^{c g}
- Flatormenis proxima (Walker, 1851)^{c g b} (northern flatid planthopper)
- Flatormenis pseudomarginata (Muir, 1924)^{c g}
- Flatormenis saucia Van Duzee, 1912^{c g b}
- Flatormenis squamulosa (Fowler, 1900)^{c g}
- Flatormenis tarnabensis Ahmed & Rao, 1986^{c g}

Data sources: i = ITIS, c = Catalogue of Life, g = GBIF, b = Bugguide.net
