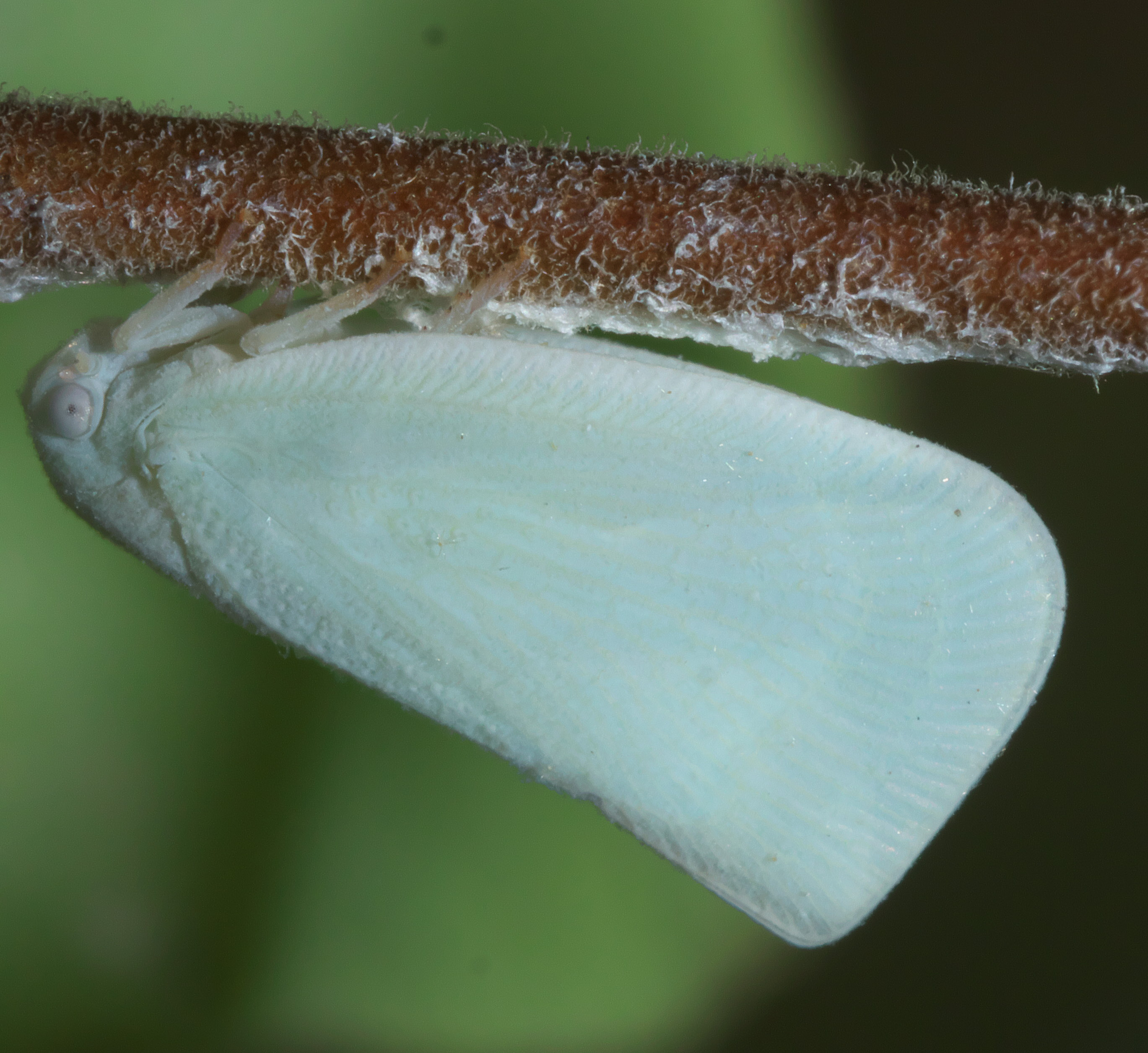
- Adult
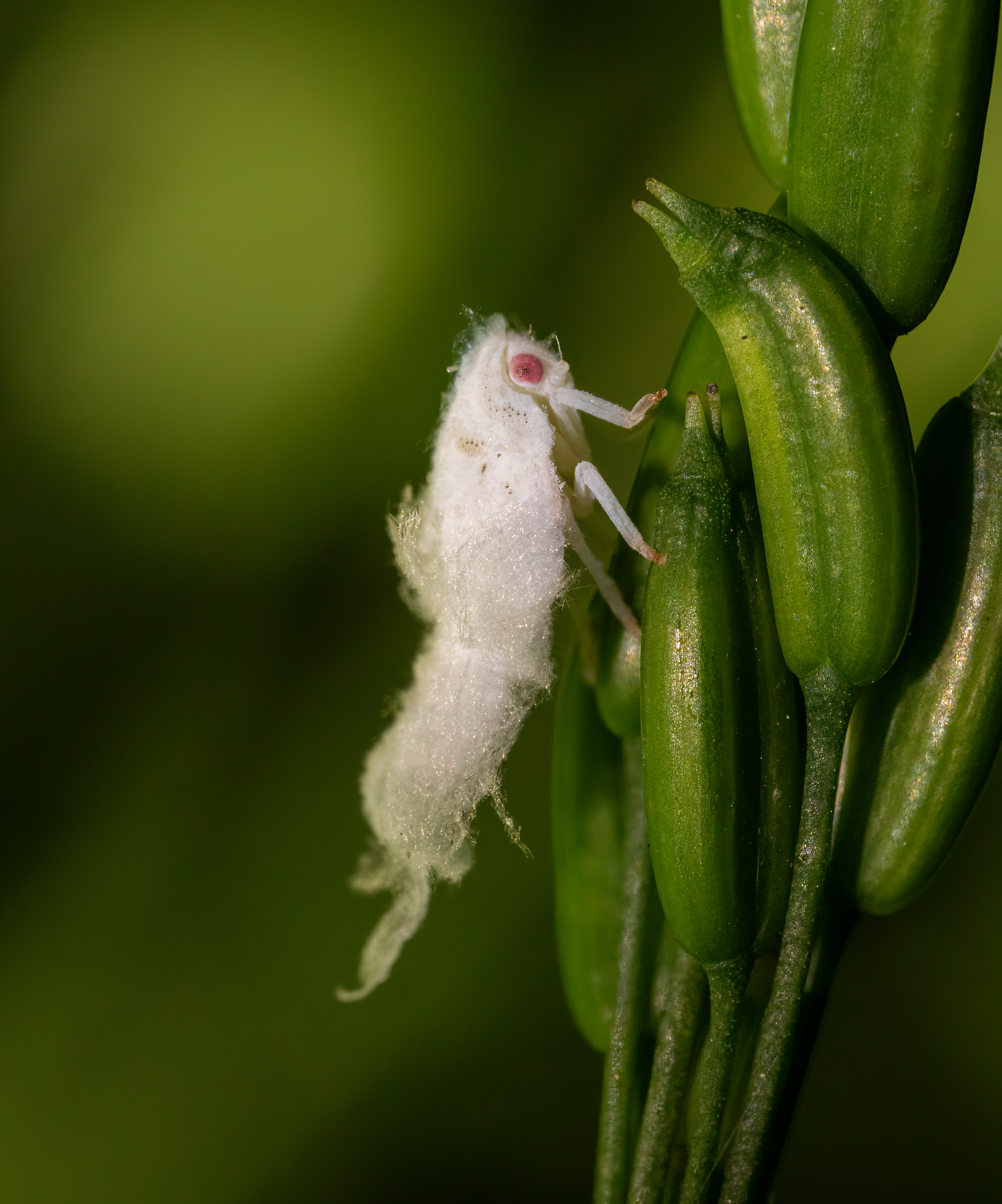
- Nymph

Scientific classification
- Kingdom: Animalia
- Phylum: Arthropoda
- Class: Insecta
- Order: Hemiptera
- Suborder: Auchenorrhyncha
- Infraorder: Fulgoromorpha
- Family: Flatidae
- Genus: Flatormenis
- Species: F. proxima

Binomial name
- Flatormenis proxima (Walker, 1851)

= Flatormenis proxima =

Species of planthopper

Flatormenis proxima, known generally as the northern flatid planthopper or mealy flatid planthopper, is a species of flatid planthopper in the family Flatidae.
