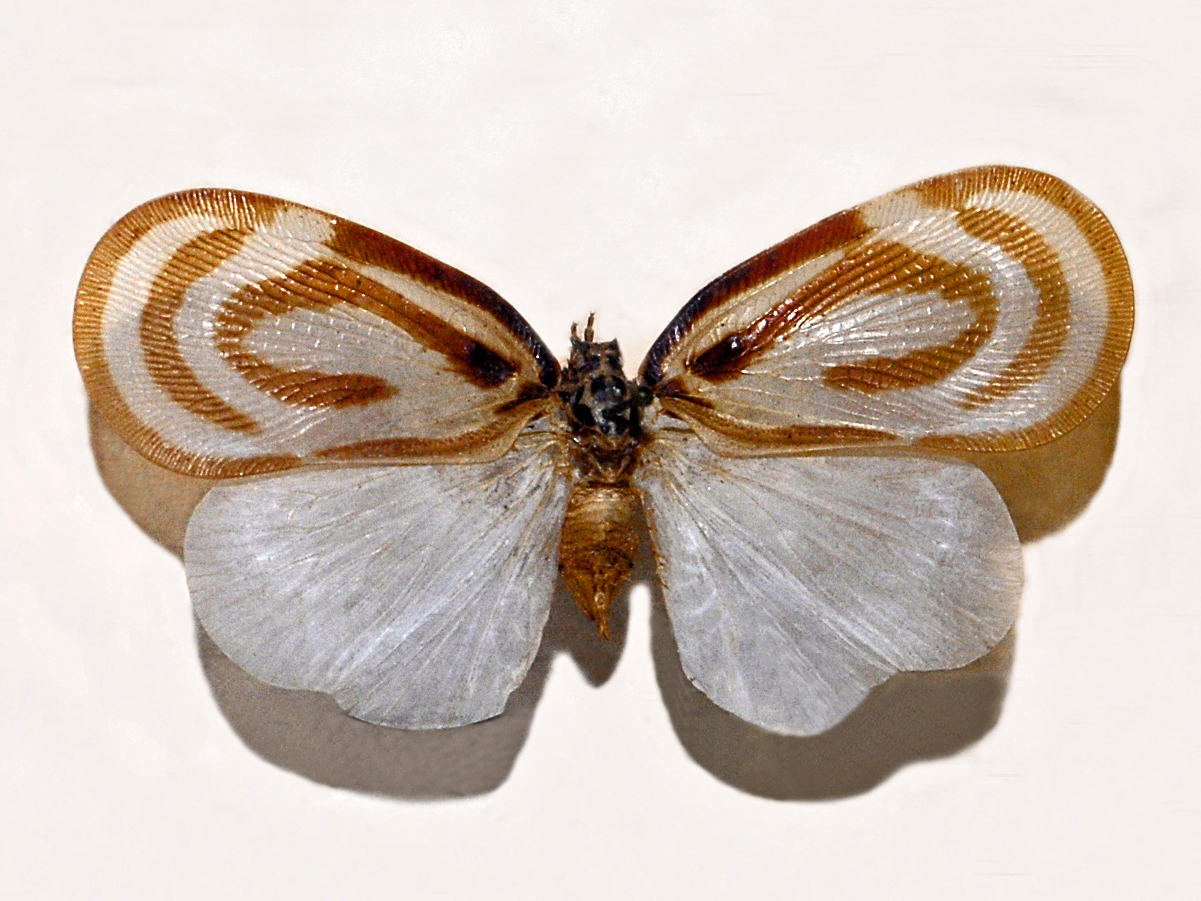
- Bythopsyrna circulata

Scientific classification
- Kingdom: Animalia
- Phylum: Arthropoda
- Class: Insecta
- Order: Hemiptera
- Suborder: Auchenorrhyncha
- Infraorder: Fulgoromorpha
- Family: Flatidae
- Tribe: Ceryniini
- Genus: Bythopsyrna; Melichar, 1901

= Bythopsyrna =

Genus of planthoppers

Bythopsyrna is a genus of Asian planthoppers belonging to the family Flatidae.

== Species ==
FLOW includes:

1. Bythopsyrna circulata (Guérin-Méneville, 1844) - type species
2. Bythopsyrna copulanda (Distant, 1892)
3. Bythopsyrna ebonfana Medler, 1999
4. Bythopsyrna intermedia Schmidt, 1913
5. Bythopsyrna raapi Schmidt, 1912
6. Bythopsyrna sumatrana Schmidt, 1904
7. Bythopsyrna tineoides (Olivier, 1791)
8. Bythopsyrna trichrousa Peng, Zhang & Wang, 2010
9. Bythopsyrna violacea Schmidt, 1904
