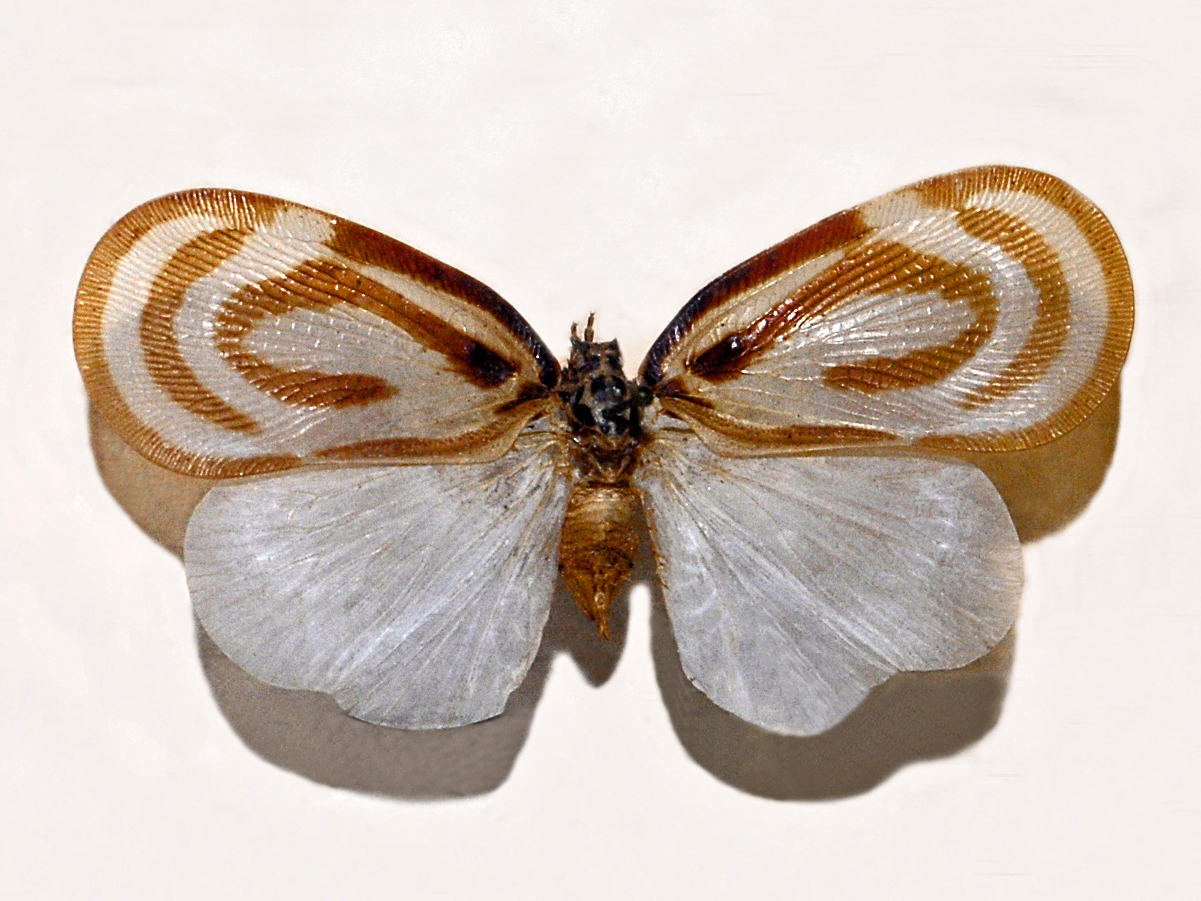
- Bythopsyrna circulata museum specimen

Scientific classification
- Kingdom: Animalia
- Phylum: Arthropoda
- Clade: Pancrustacea
- Class: Insecta
- Order: Hemiptera
- Suborder: Auchenorrhyncha
- Infraorder: Fulgoromorpha
- Family: Flatidae
- Subfamily: Flatinae
- Tribe: Ceryniini
- Genus: Bythopsyrna
- Species: B. circulata

Binomial name
- Bythopsyrna circulata (Guérin-Méneville, 1844)

Synonyms
- Bythopsyrna dohrni borneensis Schmidt, 1909; Bythopsyrna rabbowi Schmidt, 1904; Bythopsyrna udei Schmidt, 1904; Cenestra circulata Stål, 1862; Poeciloptera dianthus White, 1845

= Bythopsyrna circulata =

Species of true bug

Bythopsyrna circulata is a species of Asian planthoppers belonging to the family Flatidae.

== Description ==
Bythopsyrna circulata can reach a length of 20–24 millimetres (0.79–0.94 in). Head, pronotum and mesonotum show black spots. Wings have quite variable brown crescents, loops and bands. There is a usually intact longitudinal dark brown band along vein R of tegmen. Basal cell is brown or black. Marking patterns may be obscured by melanism and clear areas may show orange colour. The ovipositor is primitive and adapted for piercing.

== Biology and behavior ==
Bythopsyrna circulata has five larval stages and the winged adult hatches from the fifth.

This species, when stimulated by ants, produces large quantities of honeydew.

== Distribution ==
This species can be found in the subtropical and tropical forests of China, Malaysia, Thailand, Sumatra and Java.

== Bibliography ==
- Medler J. T. (1999) Flatidae (Homoptera: Fulgoroidea) of Indonesia, exclusive of Irian Jaya, Zoologische Verhandelingen (Leiden), 324: 1-88.
- Schmidt E. (1909) Zwei neue Fulgoriden aus dem Stettiner Museum, Entomologische Zeitung. Herausgegeben von dem entomologischen Vereine zu Stettin. Stettin, 70: 187-192.
- Schmidt E. (1904) Beitrag zur Kenntnis der Flatiden von Sumatra., Entomologische Zeitung. Herausgegeben von dem entomologischen Vereine zu Stettin. Stettin, 65: 182-212.
- Schmidt E. (1904) Neue und bemerkenswerthe Flatiden des Stettiner Museums, Entomologische Zeitung. Herausgegeben von dem entomologischen Vereine zu Stettin. Stettin, 65: 354-381.
- Metcalf Z. P. (1957) Part 13. Flatidae and Hypochthonellidae, In: Metcalf Z. P. 1954 - General Catalogue of the Homoptera. Fascicule IV, North Carolina State College, Raleigh(United States of America). p. 1-565.
- Stål C. (1862) Synonymiska och systematiska anteckningar öfver Hemiptera, Ofversigt af Kongliga Svenska Vetenskaps-Akademiens Förhandlingar. Stockholm, 19: 479-504.
- White A. (1845) Descriptions of a new genus and some new species of Homopterous Insects from the East in the collection of the British Museum, Annals and Magazine of Natural History. London, 15: 34-37.
- Guérin-Méneville F. E. (1844) Insectes, In: Cuvier G. L. C. F. D. 1844 - Iconographie du règne animal, 1844. p. 355-370.
- FLOW: Fulgoromorpha Lists On the WEB. Bourgoin T.
