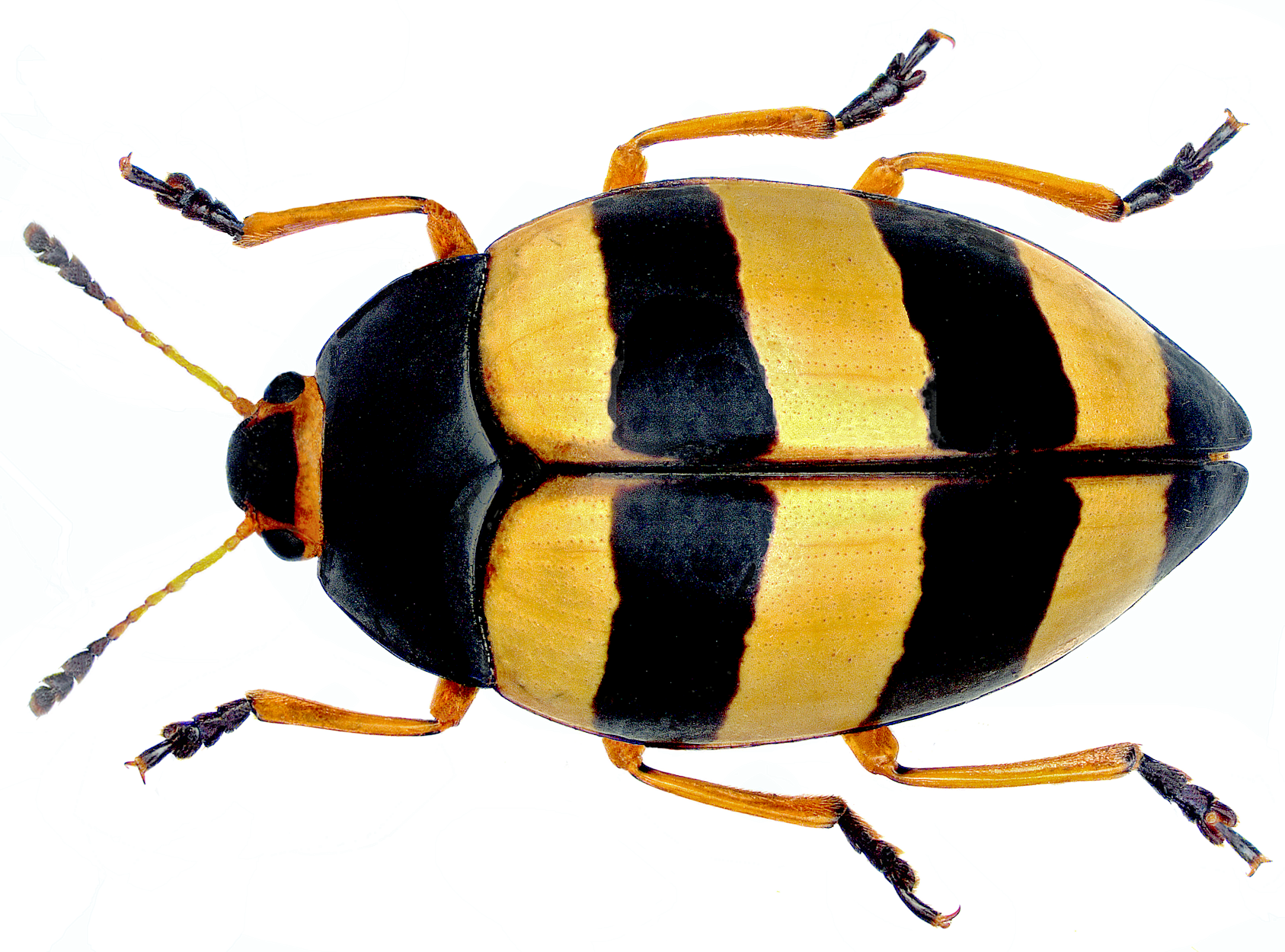
- Adult

Scientific classification
- Kingdom: Animalia
- Phylum: Arthropoda
- Clade: Pancrustacea
- Class: Insecta
- Order: Coleoptera
- Suborder: Polyphaga
- Infraorder: Cucujiformia
- Family: Erotylidae
- Genus: Iphiclus
- Species: I. trifasciatus

Binomial name
- Iphiclus trifasciatus (Olivier, 1807)

Synonyms
- see text

= Iphiclus trifasciatus =

Species of beetle

Iphiclus trifasciatus is a species of beetle of the Erotylidae family. This species is found in Paraguay, Brazil (southeastern and southern regions and Goiás) and Argentina (Chaco Province).

This beetle is 11-13 mm long and 6.5-7.5 mm wide as adults, and may be rather common – or perhaps just easily found due to its conspicuous coloration. In the 1941-42 review of the Naturalis collection, with 14 specimens it was one of the most abundantly represented of about 60 Iphiclus species (and the most abundant of subgenus Neobarytopus). Only two Iphiclus had more specimens – I.abdominalis of subgenus Iphiclus (17 specimens) and I.bimaculatus of subgenus Saccomorphus (22 specimens). However, in the famous George Crotch collection at the UMZC, I.trifasciatus is only moderately common – both among all the roughly 130 Iphiclus, as well as among the Iphiclus (Neobarytopus) – with 6 individuals.

While most Naturalis specimens of I.trifasciatus have only "Brazil" as their origin (and one has no locality data at all), two of them were sourced by Alexander Heyne from Espírito Santo (but might not have been collected there), two Hardy-Dréneuf specimens acquired in 1890 were from Porto Real, and one previously in the de Vos tot Nederveen Cappel collection and sourced by August Böttcher was from Rio de Janeiro city or state.

== Systematics ==
In the huge and probably polyphyletic genus Iphiclus, this species is placed in subgenus Neobarytopus. For some time, this subgenus was erroneously known as Brachymerus, because I.nitidulus, assumed to be a close ally of I.trifasciatus, was considered the type species of that subgenus. But the type of Brachymerus is the originally-designated I.tibialis, which is not considered particularly close to I.trifasciatus within the genus. Hence, the old name Neobarytopus again takes over for the group around its type species I.tricinctus, which is considered to include I.nitidulus and I.trifasciatus. As for all Iphiclus and allies, however, this placement is provisional, pending a thorough review.

The scientific name trifasciatus was chosen in 1807 by Guillaume-Antoine Olivier, who had first described this beetle in 1792, because he had discovered that his originally chosen name Erotylus fasciatus had already been used earlier by Johan Fabricius for the darkling beetle now known as Poecilesthus fasciatus. The invalid junior synonyms of I.trifasciatus are:

- Brachysphaenus fasciatus (Olivier, 1792, nec Fabricius, 1781: preoccupied)
- Brachysphaenus trifasciatus (Olivier, 1807)
- Brachysphoenus fasciatus (Olivier, 1792, nec Fabricius, 1781: preoccupied)
- Brachysphoenus trifasciatus (Olivier, 1807)
- Erotylus fasciatus Olivier, 1792 (non Fabricius, 1781: preoccupied)
- Erotylus trifasciatus Olivier, 1807
- Iphiclus trifasiatus (lapsus)
- Morphoides fasciatus (Olivier, 1792, nec Fabricius, 1781: preoccupied)
