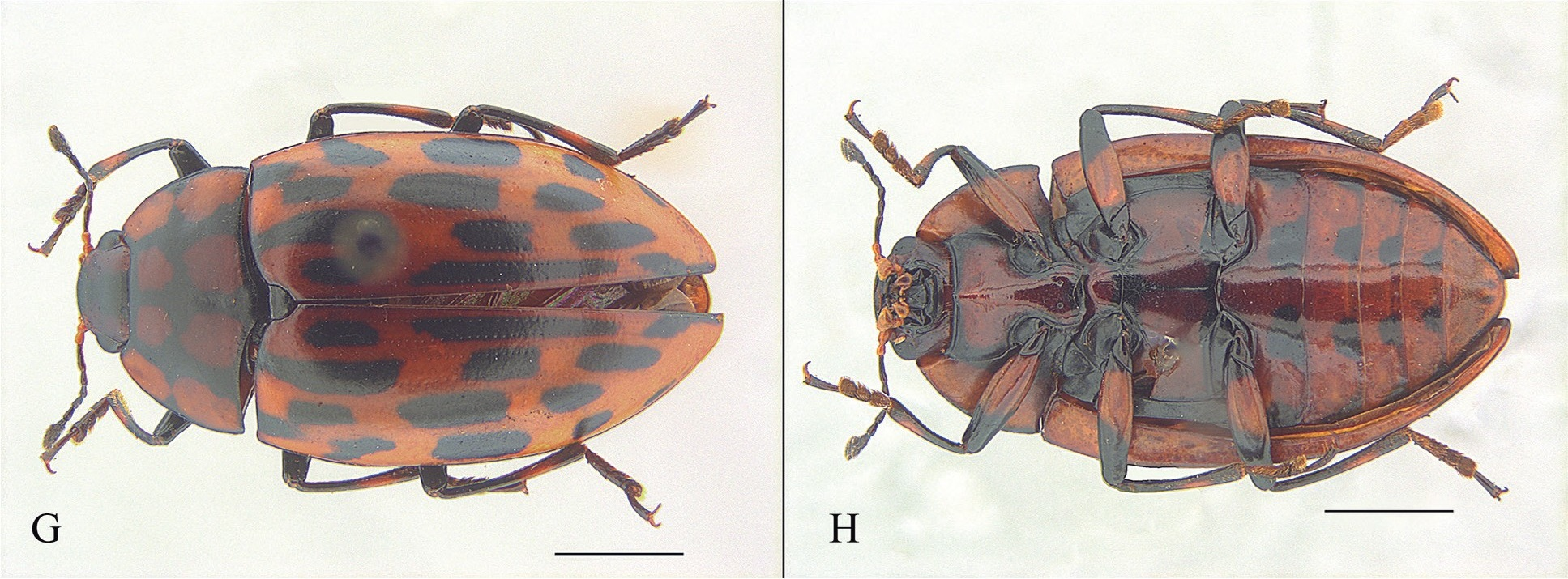

Scientific classification
- Kingdom: Animalia
- Phylum: Arthropoda
- Clade: Pancrustacea
- Class: Insecta
- Order: Coleoptera
- Suborder: Polyphaga
- Infraorder: Cucujiformia
- Family: Erotylidae
- Genus: Iphiclus
- Species: I. intersectus

Binomial name
- Iphiclus intersectus (Duponchel, 1825)

Synonyms
- Brachysphoenus intersectus (Duponchel, 1825); Erotylus intersectus Duponchel, 1825; Ischyrus intersectus (Duponchel, 1825)

= Iphiclus intersectus =

Species of beetle

Iphiclus intersectus is a South American species of pleasing fungus beetle (family Erotylidae). Within its family, it belongs to subfamily Erotylinae, and within its genus it is assigned to the subgenus Iphiclus (Iphiclus) which unites the closest relatives of the genus' type species I.flavovittatus.

This beetle is 9.5-10 mm long and 5-5.2.5 mm wide as adults. It is found in many entomological collections, but rarely in large numbers: In the 1941-42 review of the Naturalis collection, only two individuals of this species were found, and the late 20th century review of the famous George Crotch collection at the UMZC counted three; to compare, the closely related I.abdominalis, one of the most common Iphiclus (Iphiclus), numbered 17 specimens at Naturalis, and 12 in the Crotch collection.

I.intersectus is reported from in southeastern and southern Brazil; one of the Naturalis specimens is from Santa Catarina; the other, procured by Speyer and formerly in the Veth collection, came from a place named "Serra do Dourados" or similar – perhaps more likely the Serra do Dourados mountains in Paraná than the town of Serra Dourada much further north. But in addition, there is material of this species from Peru in the SEMC, suggesting that I.intersectus is not particularly common (or just hard to find) but might occur across a vast range.
