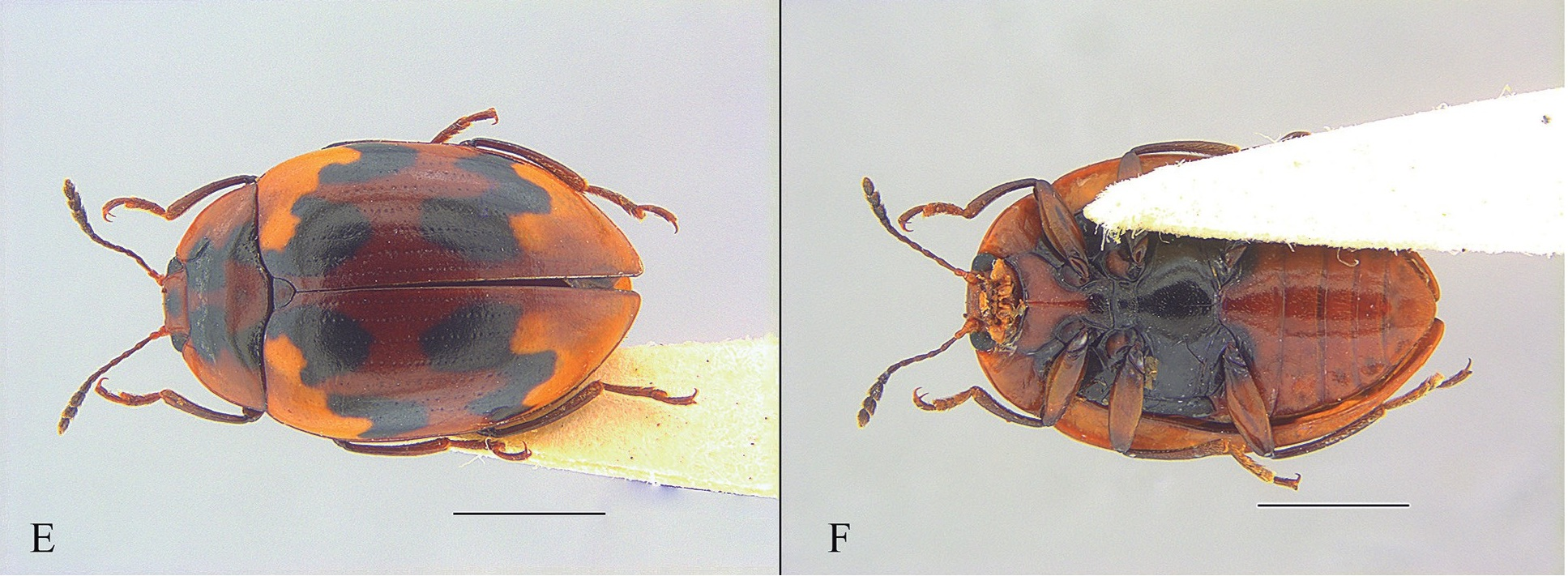
- Iphiclus sulphurifer, type species of the disputed subgenus Habrodactylus

Scientific classification
- Kingdom: Animalia
- Phylum: Arthropoda
- Clade: Pancrustacea
- Class: Insecta
- Order: Coleoptera
- Suborder: Polyphaga
- Infraorder: Cucujiformia
- Family: Erotylidae
- Genus: Iphiclus; Chevrolat, 1837

Type species
- Erotylus flavovittatus Duponchel, 1825

Synonyms
- Acronotus Lacordaire, 1842 (non Smith, 1827: preoccupied); Barytopus Lacordaire, 1842 (non Chevrolat, 1836: preoccupied); Brachymerus Chevrolat, 1837; Brachysphaenus Kuhnt, 1909; Brachysphenus Gorham, 1888; Brachysphoenus Lacordaire, 1842; Charidemus Gistel, 1848; Megaprotus Lacordaire, 1842; Morphoides Hope, 1841; Morphoides Crotch, 1876 (non Hope, 1841: preoccupied); Neobarytopus Alvarenga, 1965; Oogaster Lacordaire, 1842 (non Falderman, 1840: preoccupied); Saccomorphus Chevrolat, 1837

= Iphiclus =

Genus of beetles

Iphiclus is a large genus – possibly the most diverse – in the pleasing fungus beetle family (Erotylidae). This genus belongs to subfamily Erotylinae and occurs across the Neotropics. Its almost 300 named species are divided into several subgenera, whose monophyly (and validity), however, remains to be determined. Most of these beetles, as adults as well as larvae, feed on polypores (shelf fungi).

The genus name was established by Louis Chevrolat in 1837. Chevrolat's name was, however, overshadowed by the extensive study of Jean Théodore Lacordaire a few years later, who described most of the currently-known species and introduced the genus name Brachysphoenus. That genus name, or spelling variants thereof, was generally used by subsequent authors – namely in the seminal works on the genus by George Crotch in the mid-1870s, Henry Gorham in the late 1880s, Paul Kuhnt around 1910, Leopold Mader around 1940, and Jacintho Guérin in 1956 –, until Iphiclus was reinstated by Moacyr Alvarenga in the 1960s.

== Description ==
Iphiclus unites species which are fairly large by the standards of their family (about 6.5-17 mm long and 4-9 mm wide as adults), and generally similar to Erotylus and other close relatives. They can be recognized by an elongated oval shape and elytra which are usually only slightly convex (unlike some relatives such as Aegithus, which are almost hemispherical); the rear edge of the pronotum has at least a weak – in some, a pronounced – rearward bulge in the middle lobe. The head of Ischyrus has a short wedge-like snout, compound eyes with small ommatidia, a short wedge-shaped clypeus with a wide base, and 11-segmented antennae with a "club" at the tip in which the segments are still distinctly visible. The mentum has a triangular plate, the ends of the maxillary palps are widened to a triangle shape, the maxillary lacinia bear two small teeth, and the mouth-cavity sides are flattened lobes. There are no ornaments on the head, and the pronotum is likewise smooth. The legs are of moderate length, with tarsi whose first three segments are increasingly widened.

== Systematics ==
The division into subgenera must be considered provisional. As of the early 21st century, even the monophyly of the genus as such is not considered likely anymore; some subgenera (in particular Habrodactylus) are probably paraphyletic, while others (such as Megaprotus) seem to warrant recognition as distinct genera.

=== Subgenus Aegithomorphus ===
Iphiclus (Aegithomorphus) Lacordaire, 1842. Type species: I.biplagiatus.

Southeastern Brazil.

- Iphiclus biplagiatus (Guérin-Méneville, 1841)
- Iphiclus dorsomaculatus (Lacordaire, 1842)

=== Subgenus Brachymerus ===
Iphiclus (Brachymerus) Dejean 1836 (= Morphoides Crotch, 1876 (non Hope, 1841: preoccupied), Neomorphoides). Type species: I.tibialis, erroneously re-designated as I.nitidulus (now subgenus Neobarytopus).

Body oval. Pronotum usually almost square and flat or slightly convex, rarely more strongly convex. Prosternum keeled in some species, but unkeeled in others. Tarsi wide and robust, first segment of hindleg tarsi elongated. Higly variable; presence or lack of prosternal keel distinguishes otherwise similar species.

Lowlands and foothills from Guatemala to southern Brazil.

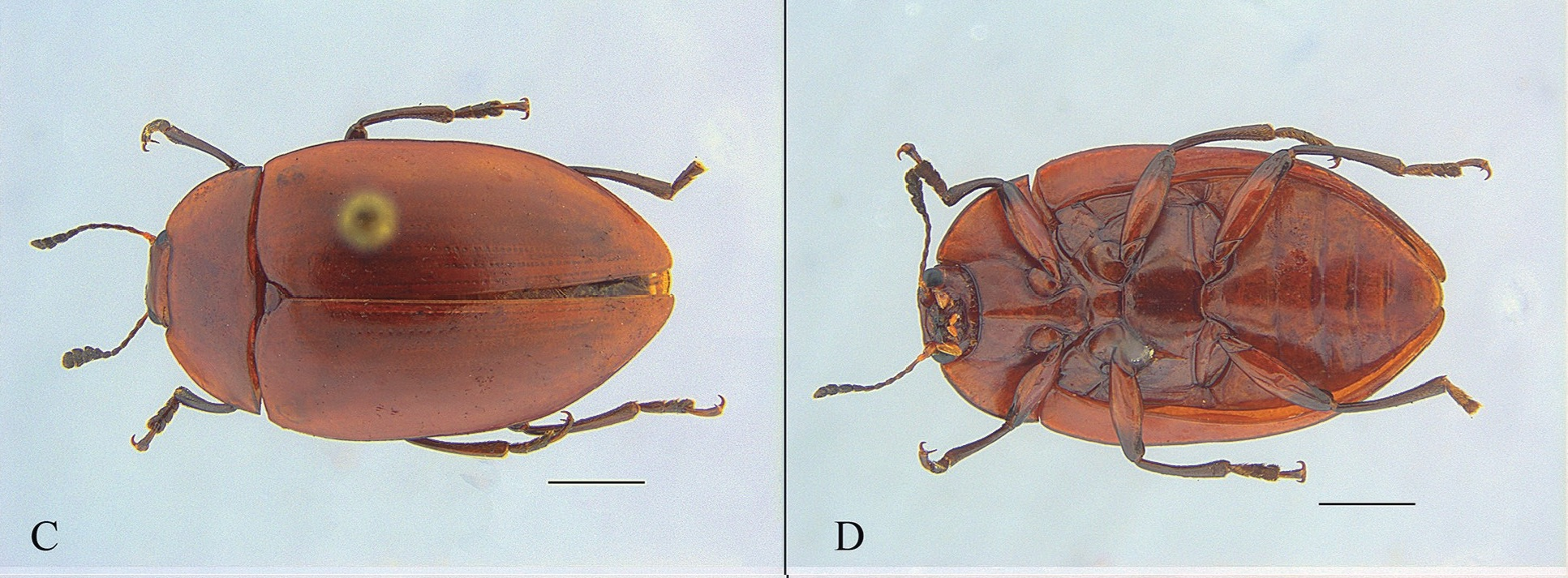
Iphiclus simplex of subgenus Brachymerus

- Iphiclus amazonus (Crotch, 1876)
- Iphiclus atriventris (Mader, 1943)
- Iphiclus bicolor (Lacordaire, 1842)
- Iphiclus clavicornis (Olivier, 1792) (= I.lacordairei)
- Iphiclus columbiae (Crotch, 1876)
- Iphiclus costaricensis (Mader, 1943)
- Iphiclus disconigrum (Mader, 1942)
- Iphiclus dorsonotatus (= I.haematopterus)
- Iphiclus fabricii Skelley, 2020 (= I.immaculatus, I.rufipennis (Fabricius, 1801 nec Panzer, 1798: preoccupied))
- Iphiclus fulviventris (Gorham, 1888)
- Iphiclus humeropictus (Mader, 1943)
- Iphiclus lateripunctatus (Crotch, 1876)
- Iphiclus melanopus (Gorham, 1888)
- Iphiclus neglectus (Guérin, 1956)
- Iphiclus nigritarsis (Mader, 1942)
- Iphiclus nigriventris (Crotch, 1876)
- Iphiclus nigropectus (Mader, 1943)
- Iphiclus posticenigrum (Mader, 1942)
- Iphiclus pyrrhocephalus (Erichson, 1847)
- Iphiclus rubripennis (Lacordaire, 1842)
- Iphiclus signaticollis (Kuhnt, 1910)
- Iphiclus simplex
- Iphiclus spilotus (Gorham, 1888)
- Iphiclus tibialis (Duponchel, 1825)

=== Subgenus Habrodactylus ===
Iphiclus (Habrodactylus) Lacordaire, 1842. Type species: I.sulphurifer. Probably a paraphyletic group, with I.conspicillatus basal to the entire assemblage of Iphiclus and related genera, while some other species placed in this subgenus are closer to genus Ellipticus and Erotylina.

Body oval; rather small (less than 10 mm). Pronotum usually short and wide, more or less tapering to the front. Tarsi usually narrow; on the hindlegs the first tarsal segment is elongated, usually as long as segments 2 and 3 together. Some are patterned with eyespots; others are largely brownish with little black patterning. Larvae feed individually in some species, but as a group in I.conspicillatus.

Lowlands and foothills from southern Mexico to northern Argentina.

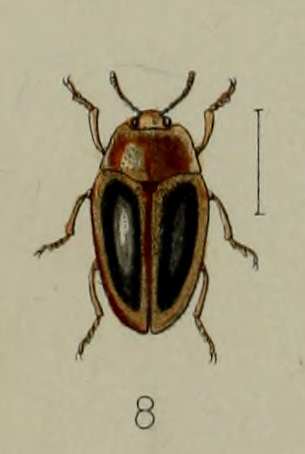
Iphiclus egensis of subgenus Habrodactylus

- Iphiclus agathinus (Guérin-Méneville, 1841)
- Iphiclus annulatus
- Iphiclus antennalis (Lacordaire, 1842)
- Iphiclus arculifer (Kirsch, 1883)
- Iphiclus basinotatus (Crotch, 1876)
- Iphiclus bisquadripunctatus (Kuhnt, 1911)
- Iphiclus bisquinquepunctatus (Lacordaire, 1842)
- Iphiclus bisquinquesignatus (Mader, 1942)
- Iphiclus bistripunctatus (Lacordaire, 1842)
- Iphiclus brevicollis (Gorham, 1888)
- Iphiclus centromaculatus (Lacordaire, 1842)
- Iphiclus cereus (Gorham, 1888)
- Iphiclus concolor (Lacordaire, 1842)
- Iphiclus congener (Lacordaire, 1842)
- Iphiclus conspicillatus (Gorham, 1888)
- Iphiclus cordiger (Crotch, 1876)
- Iphiclus decemoculatus (Mader, 1943)
- Iphiclus decemplagiatus (Kuhnt, 1910)
- Iphiclus decempunctatus
- Iphiclus deficiens (Crotch, 1876)
- Iphiclus deletus (Lacordaire, 1842)
- Iphiclus detritus (Lacordaire, 1842)
- Iphiclus discrepans (Guérin, 1956)
- Iphiclus discus (Lacordaire, 1842)
- Iphiclus egensis (Gorham, 1889)
- Iphiclus exiguenotatus (Gorham, 1888)
- Iphiclus festivus (Lacordaire, 1842)
- Iphiclus fulvipennis (Erichson, 1847)
- Iphiclus fuscipes
- Iphiclus fuscomaculatus (Duponchel, 1825)
- Iphiclus grammicoides (Mader, 1943)
- Iphiclus grammicus (Erichson, 1847)
- Iphiclus haematites (Lacordaire, 1842)
- Iphiclus haematomelas (Lacordaire, 1842)
- Iphiclus hamatus (Guérin, 1956)
- Iphiclus hoffmani
- Iphiclus hybridus (Lacordaire, 1842)
- Iphiclus ictericus (Lacordaire, 1842)
- Iphiclus jejunus (Gorham, 1888)
- Iphiclus kourouensis (Lacordaire, 1842)
- Iphiclus manicatus (Lacordaire, 1842)
- Iphiclus melanostictus (Crotch, 1876)
- Iphiclus meleagris (Lacordaire, 1842)
- Iphiclus mendax (Lacordaire, 1842)
- Iphiclus multiguttatus (Gorham, 1888)
- Iphiclus obliquatus (Kuhnt, 1910)
- Iphiclus obliqueguttatus (Crotch, 1876)
- Iphiclus oblitus (Lacordaire, 1842)
- Iphiclus oblongonotatus (Lacordaire, 1842)
- Iphiclus pallidipennis (Gorham, 1888)
- Iphiclus palmatus (Lacordaire, 1842)
- Iphiclus perspicillatus (Lacordaire, 1842)
- Iphiclus proximus (Guérin-Méneville, 1844)
- Iphiclus punctiger (Lacordaire, 1842)
- Iphiclus quadrimaculatus (Duponchel, 1825)
- Iphiclus rufescens (Lacordaire, 1842)
- Iphiclus rufifrons (Lacordaire, 1842)
- Iphiclus scutulatus (Kuhnt, 1910)
- Iphiclus septemmaculatus (Guérin, 1956)
- Iphiclus spadiceus (Lacordaire, 1842)
- Iphiclus striatipennis (Gorham, 1888)
- Iphiclus subsignatus (Lacordaire, 1842)
- Iphiclus sulphurifer
- Iphiclus tabidus (Erichson, 1847)
- Iphiclus tetrastictus (Crotch, 1876)
- Iphiclus thoracicus (Kirsch, 1876)
- Iphiclus vetula (Lacordaire, 1842)

=== Subgenus Iphiclus ===
Iphiclus (Iphiclus) Chevrolat, 1837. Type species: I.flavovittatus. Close to subgenus Saccomorphus and genus Erotylina.

Body usually elongated-oval. Pronotum wide. First segment of hindleg tarsi usually shorter than segments 2 and 3 together. Elytra often patterned with light spots or eyespots. Larvae feed individually?

Lowlands and foothills from Guatemala to northern Paraguay.

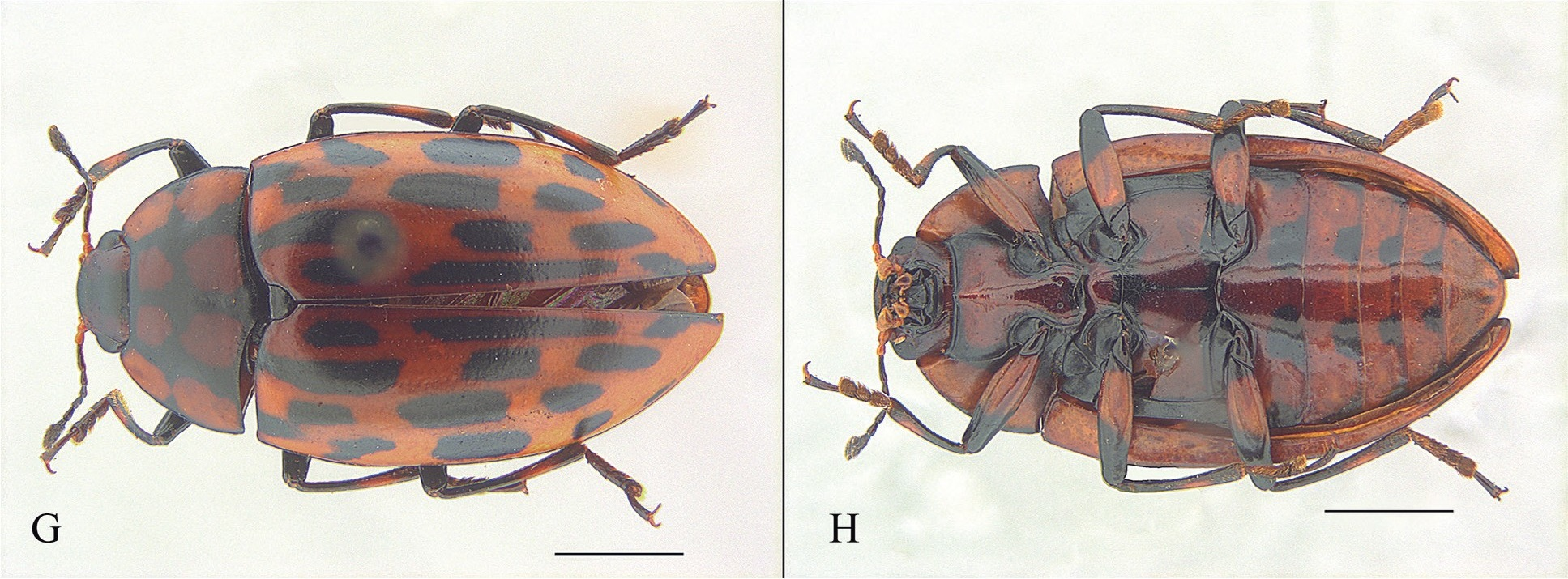
Iphiclus intersectus of subgenus Iphiclus

- Iphiclus abdominalis
- Iphiclus atrisignatus Alvarenga, 1976 (= I.conspersus (Duponchel, 1825, nec Germar, 1824: preoccupied))
- Iphiclus basalis (Crotch, 1876)
- Iphiclus chelonarius (Lacordaire, 1842)
- Iphiclus cingulatus (Lacordaire, 1842)
- Iphiclus claropictus (Kuhnt, 1910)
- Iphiclus decemnotatus (Duponchel, 1825)
- Iphiclus flavovittatoides (Mader, 1943)
- Iphiclus flavovittatus (Duponchel, 1825)
- Iphiclus flexuosus (Lacordaire, 1842)
- Iphiclus guttatus (Duponchel, 1825)
- Iphiclus guttiger (Kuhnt, 1910)
- Iphiclus intersectus
- Iphiclus lineellus (Duponchel, 1825)
- Iphiclus ocellatus (Kuhnt, 1910)
- Iphiclus octodecimguttatus (Lacordaire, 1842)
- Iphiclus pardalinus (Lacordaire, 1842)
- Iphiclus pictus (Duponchel, 1825)
- Iphiclus quadristictus (Guérin, 1956)
- Iphiclus quinquevigintipunctatus (Mader, 1943)
- Iphiclus rubidus
- Iphiclus scutellaris (Gorham, 1888)
- Iphiclus sedecimguttatus (Olivier, 1792) (= I.maculatus)
- Iphiclus sedecimmaculatus
- Iphiclus sedecimpustulatus (Lacordaire, 1842)
- Iphiclus sexpunctatus
- Iphiclus striolatus (Guérin, 1956)
- Iphiclus tenuecinctus (Lacordaire, 1842)
- Iphiclus titschacki (Mader, 1942)
- Iphiclus varians (Lacordaire, 1842) (= I.mnigrum)
- Iphiclus ventralis (Lacordaire, 1842)
- Iphiclus vigintipunctatus

=== Subgenus Megaprotus ===
Iphiclus (Megaprotus) Lacordaire, 1842. Type species: I.signatus. Close to subgenus Brachymerus and genus Prepopharus.

Body rounded oval, more or less strongly convex back, fairly small. Pronotum short and wide, strongly tapering to the front and with a deeply concave frontal margin. Tarsi usually narrow. Some are patterned with eyespots. Males of some species have a deep groove in the front of the head, and widened foreleg tarsi. Larvae feed individually?

Lowlands and foothills from southern Mexico to northern Argentina.

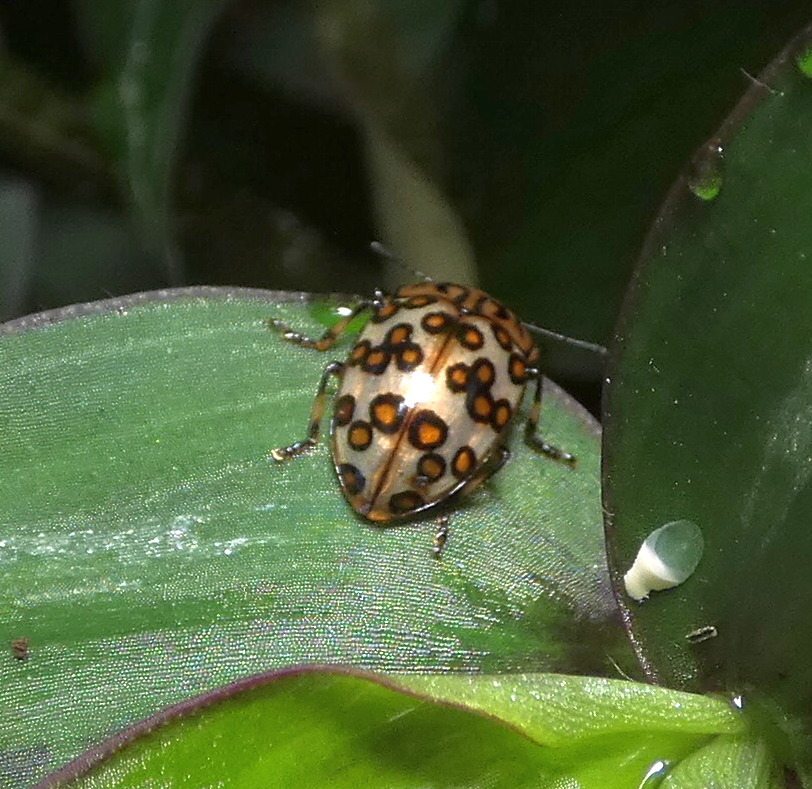
Iphiclus argus of subgenus Megaprotus

- Iphiclus ardens (Curran, 1941)
- Iphiclus argus (Kuhnt, 1910)
- Iphiclus catillifer (Gorham, 1888)
- Iphiclus cinctellus (Lacordaire, 1842)
- Iphiclus circulus (Lacordaire, 1842)
- Iphiclus clarosignatus (Kuhnt, 1910)
- Iphiclus coadunatus (Lacordaire, 1842)
- Iphiclus cunctabandus (Mader, 1942)
- Iphiclus decussatus (Lacordaire, 1842)
- Iphiclus delineatus (Lacordaire, 1842)
- Iphiclus dilectus (Gorham, 1888)
- Iphiclus duodecimpustulatus (Lacordaire, 1842)
- Iphiclus duplicatus (Lacordaire, 1842)
- Iphiclus ephippium
- Iphiclus epigraphus (Crotch, 1876)
- Iphiclus eximius (Lacordaire, 1842)
- Iphiclus fasciellus (Crotch, 1876)
- Iphiclus fasciunculus (Crotch, 1876)
- Iphiclus laetus (Crotch, 1876)
- Iphiclus laevipennis (Kuhnt, 1910)
- Iphiclus luctuosus (Kuhnt, 1910)
- Iphiclus luteoniger (Crotch, 1876)
- Iphiclus luteopictus (Crotch, 1876)
- Iphiclus masculinus (Crotch, 1876)
- Iphiclus moniliferus (Guérin-Méneville, 1841)
- Iphiclus nubilus (Lacordaire, 1842)
- Iphiclus nuculus (Gorham, 1888)
- Iphiclus obliteratus (Guérin, 1956)
- Iphiclus octolinearis (Kuhnt, 1910)
- Iphiclus octopunctatus (Kirsch, 1876)
- Iphiclus orphanulus (Lacordaire, 1842)
- Iphiclus patruelis (Kuhnt, 1910)
- Iphiclus perlepidus (Lacordaire, 1842)
- Iphiclus pithecius (Lacordaire, 1842)
- Iphiclus porcellana (Lacordaire, 1842)
- Iphiclus pulcher (Gorham, 1888)
- Iphiclus sedecimlinearis (Mader, 1942)
- Iphiclus sedecimpunctatus (Lacordaire, 1842)
- Iphiclus sedecimstrigatus (Mader, 1942)
- Iphiclus sexsigillatus (Lacordaire, 1842)
- Iphiclus signatus (= I.amabilis)
- Iphiclus zonulus (Crotch, 1873)

=== Subgenus Neacronotus ===
Iphiclus (Neacronotus) Alvarenga, 1965 (= Acronotus Lacordaire, 1842 (non Smith, 1827: preoccupied)). Type species: I.annularis.

Colombia; doubtful record from Mexico.

- Iphiclus annularis (Laporte, 1840)
- Iphiclus bimaculicollis (Mader, 1942)
- Iphiclus colombi (Guérin-Méneville, 1844)
- Iphiclus perversus (Gorham, 1889)

=== Subgenus Neobarytopus ===
Iphiclus (Neobarytopus) Alvarenga, 1965 (= Barytopus Lacordaire, 1842 (non Chevrolat, 1836: preoccupied)). Type species: I.tricinctus. Close to subgenus Megaprotus and genus Prepopharus.

Body oval, sides almost parallel in some species. Pronotum comparatively long, slightly tapering to the front, with a strongly bulging center of rear edge; color usually black, sometimes bicolored or light. Elytra with lengthwise double rows of small punctuations, or smooth; color usually black, as well as yellow, orange or red, in crosswise jagged bands or dots.

Lowlands and foothills from Guatemala to northern Argentina. At least in Colombia, seem to prefer lower-lying regions.

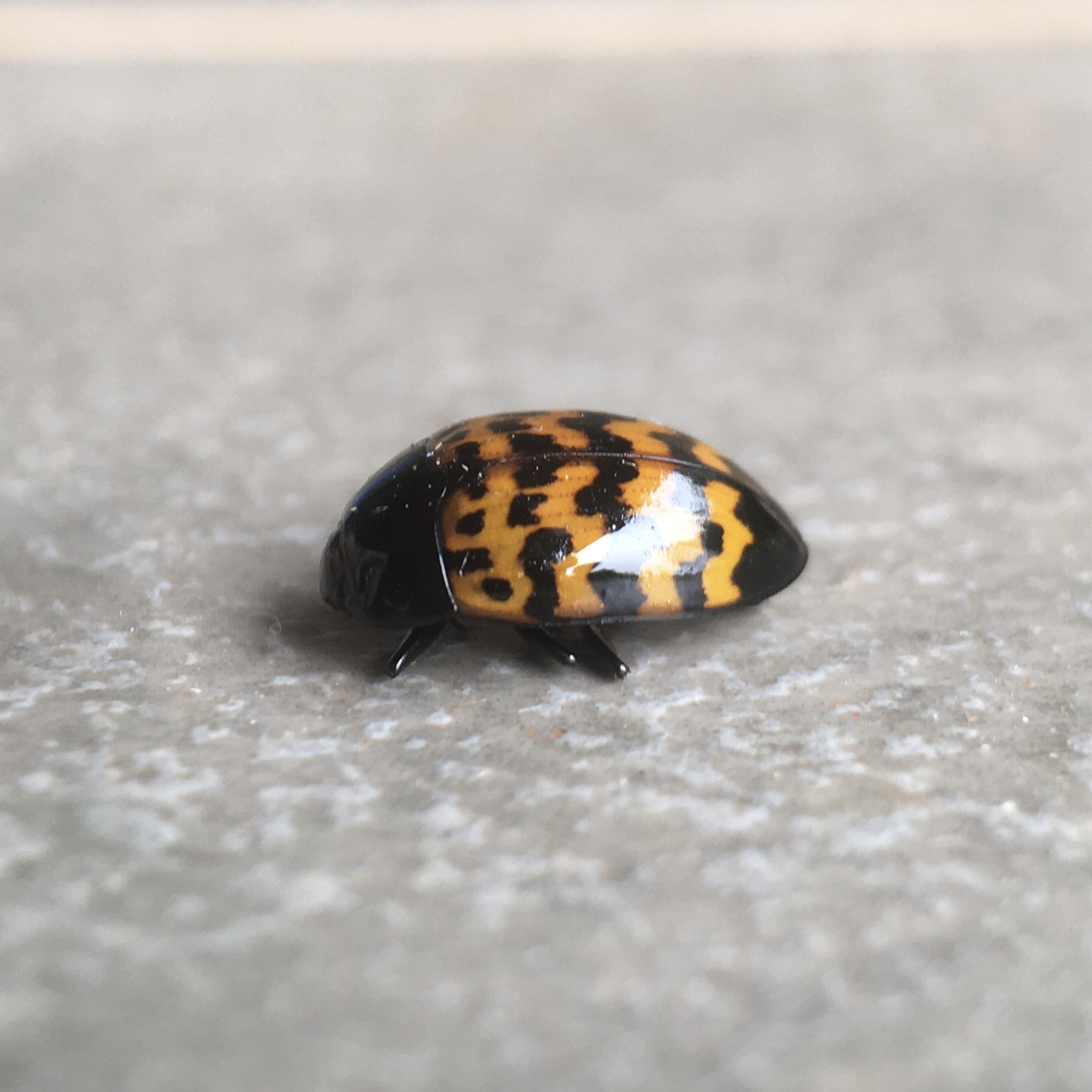
Iphiclus brongniarti of subgenus Neobarytopus

- Iphiclus adustus
- Iphiclus alboniger (Guérin, 1956)
- Iphiclus amictus (Erichson, 1847)
- Iphiclus andicola (Kirsch, 1876)
- Iphiclus assequens (Mader, 1942)
- Iphiclus bajulus (Lacordaire, 1842)
- Iphiclus batesi (Gorham, 1889)
- Iphiclus bellulus (Lacordaire, 1842)
- Iphiclus bicinctus (Olivier, 1807)
- Iphiclus bistrifoliatus (Gorham, 1889)
- Iphiclus bizonatus (Crotch, 1876)
- Iphiclus bremei (Guérin-Méneville, 1841)
- Iphiclus brongniarti (Lacordaire, 1842)
- Iphiclus brunneostriolatus (Kuhnt, 1910)
- Iphiclus cerasinus (Lacordaire, 1842)
- Iphiclus conformis (Lacordaire, 1842)
- Iphiclus distinctus (Duponchel, 1825)
- Iphiclus divisus (Guérin, 1956)
- Iphiclus dorsalis (Olivier, 1792)
- Iphiclus eburneus (Crotch, 1876)
- Iphiclus elegans (Mader, 1942)
- Iphiclus epipleuralis (Crotch, 1876)
- Iphiclus erichsoni (Lacordaire, 1842)
- Iphiclus flavofasciatus (Duponchel, 1825)
- Iphiclus flavosignatus (Duponchel, 1825)
- Iphiclus fragmentatus (Gorham, 1888)
- Iphiclus friedeli (Mader, 1938)
- Iphiclus geometra (Lacordaire, 1842)
- Iphiclus hebraicus (Lacordaire, 1842)
- Iphiclus hexastictus (Crotch, 1876)
- Iphiclus incas (Gorham, 1889)
- Iphiclus iris (Guérin, 1956)
- Iphiclus jacinthoi Alvarenga, 1977 (= I.oculatus (Guérin, 1956, nec Duponchel, 1825: preoccupied))
- Iphiclus laceratus (Mader, 1938)
- Iphiclus lugens (Lacordaire, 1842)
- Iphiclus lunaris (Guérin, 1956)
- Iphiclus luteozonatus (Crotch, 1876)
- Iphiclus miles (Mader, 1942)
- Iphiclus mirus (Mader, 1942)
- Iphiclus musicalis (Lacordaire, 1842)
- Iphiclus neophyta (Lacordaire, 1842)
- Iphiclus nigripennis (De Mey, 1838)
- Iphiclus nigropictus (Lacordaire, 1842)
- Iphiclus nigrotrifasciatus (Mader, 1942)
- Iphiclus nitidulus (Olivier, 1807)
- Iphiclus obsoletesignatus (Crotch, 1876)
- Iphiclus octoguttatus (Olivier, 1807) (= I.oculatus (Duponchel, 1825))
- Iphiclus octopustulatus (Guérin, 1956)
- Iphiclus odyneroides (Crotch, 1876)
- Iphiclus ornatus (Kuhnt, 1909)
- Iphiclus pantherinus (Kuhnt, 1909)
- Iphiclus pauper (Guérin, 1956)
- Iphiclus peraffinis (Crotch, 1876)
- Iphiclus perplexus (Mader, 1942)
- Iphiclus peruvianus (Mader, 1942)
- Iphiclus planipennis (Kuhnt, 1909)
- Iphiclus puncticollis (Kirsch, 1876)
- Iphiclus quadrifasciatus (Kirsch, 1865)
- Iphiclus quinquefasciatus (Lacordaire, 1842)
- Iphiclus ramosus (Olivier, 1807) (= I.dilaceratus)
- Iphiclus regularis (Erichson, 1848)
- Iphiclus rhomboidalis (Guérin, 1956)
- Iphiclus rufipennis (Panzer, 1798) (= I.exoticus)
- Iphiclus salamandra (Erichson, 1847)
- Iphiclus spectabilis (Lacordaire, 1842)
- Iphiclus stramineus (Lacordaire, 1842)
- Iphiclus subsanguineus (Crotch, 1876)
- Iphiclus superbus (Mader, 1942)
- Iphiclus tigrinatus (Guérin, 1956)
- Iphiclus tricinctus (Duponchel, 1825)
- Iphiclus trifasciatus (= I.fasciatus (Olivier, 1792, nec Fabricius, 1781: preoccupied))
- Iphiclus tripartitus (Lacordaire, 1842)
- Iphiclus ucayalensis (Gorham, 1889)
- Iphiclus venezuelae (Crotch, 1876)
- Iphiclus westwoodi (Guérin-Méneville, 1841)

=== Subgenus Neoogaster ===
Iphiclus (Neoogaster) Alvarenga, 1965 (= Oogaster Lacordaire, 1842 (non Falderman, 1840: preoccupied)). Type species: I.guadeloupensis.

Resemble Aegithus in coloration, being black with unpatterned tan elytra, but are overall flatter and narrower in shape; larvae also similar to Aegithus.

Guadeloupe and Dominica (Lesser Antilles) and possibly adjacent islands; a record from French Guiana is erroneous.

- Iphiclus guadeloupensis (Fabricius, 1792) (= I.marginatus)
- Iphiclus suturalis (Lacordaire, 1842)

=== Subgenus Saccomorphus ===
Iphiclus (Saccomorphus) Chevrolat , 1837 (= Charidemus, Morphoides Hope, 1841). Type species: I.limbatus. Close to genus Erotylina.

Body oval, with more or less parallel sides. Pronotum almost square, flat, often with dimple at base which contains numerous small punctuations. Elytra usually dull, not shiny. At least some apparently eat a wider range of fungi than other species placed in Iphiclus.

Lowlands and foothills from Panama to northern Argentina and Chile. At least in Colombia, seem to range rather far up in the Andes.

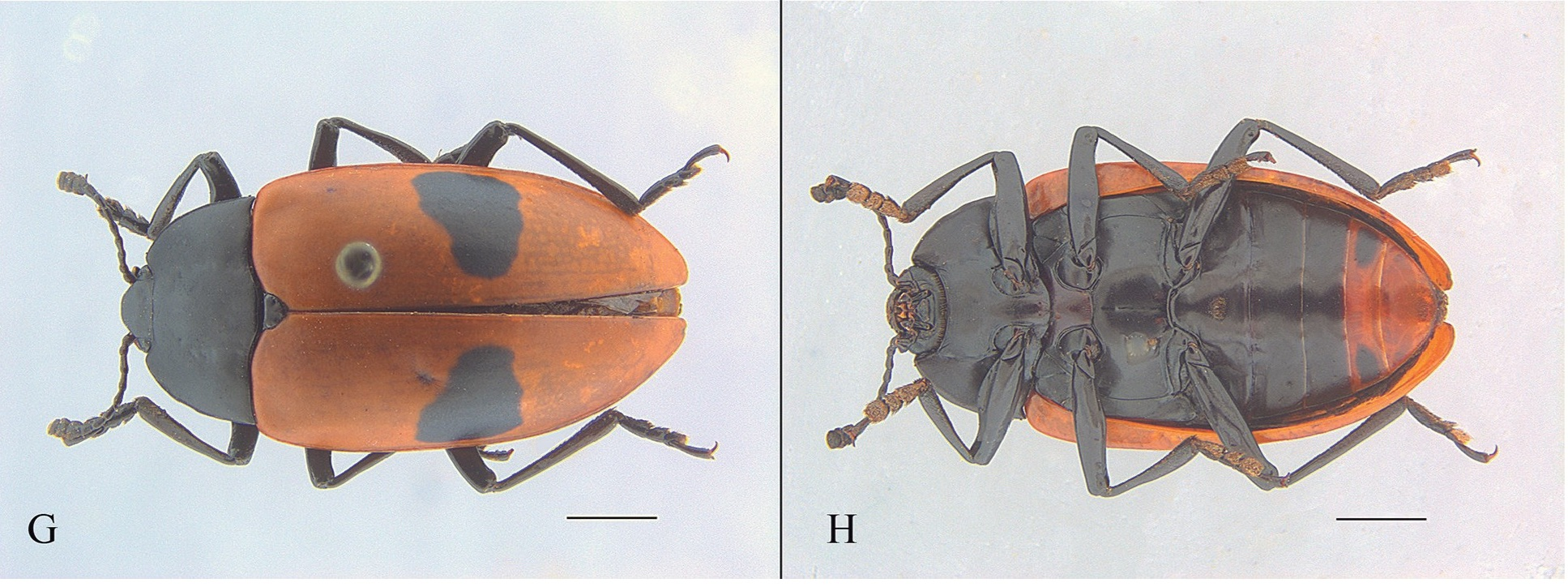
Iphiclus bimaculatus of subgenus Saccomorphus

- Iphiclus adamsi (Lacordaire, 1842)
- Iphiclus bilineatus (Duponchel, 1825)
- Iphiclus bimaculatus
- Iphiclus bisigillatus (Lacordaire, 1842)
- Iphiclus collaris (Deelder, 1942)
- Iphiclus erotyloides (Crotch, 1876)
- Iphiclus erythrocephalus (Olivier, 1807)
- Iphiclus glyptoderus (Lacordaire, 1842)
- Iphiclus goianus (Guérin, 1948)
- Iphiclus haematocephalus (Lacordaire, 1842)
- Iphiclus humeralis (Guérin, 1956)
- Iphiclus intercedens (Schenkling, 1919)
- Iphiclus interruptus (Kuhnt, 1908) (formerly in I.erotyloides)
- Iphiclus klugi (Lacordaire, 1842)
- Iphiclus krafti (Mader, 1935)
- Iphiclus kuhnti (Mader, 1942)
- Iphiclus limbatus (Olivier, 1792)
- Iphiclus maculicollis (Kuhnt, 1910)
- Iphiclus mundus (Schenkling, 1919)
- Iphiclus mutabilis (Gorham, 1889)
- Iphiclus nebulosus (Guérin-Méneville, 1841)
- Iphiclus nitidus (Mader, 1942)
- Iphiclus paraguayanus (Mader, 1943)
- Iphiclus placitus (Kirsch, 1876)
- Iphiclus procerus (Erichson, 1847) (formerly in subgenus Morphoides)
- Iphiclus quadrisignatus (Duponchel, 1825)
- Iphiclus ruficeps (Guérin-Méneville, 1841)
- Iphiclus terrestris (Gistel, 1857)
- Iphiclus testaceipennis (Mader, 1942)

=== Subgenus Sternolobus ===
Iphiclus (Sternolobus) Guérin-Méneville, 1841. Type species: I.bisignatus.

Body elongated-oval. Prosternum strongly keeled, particularly in the front.

Eastern Andes foothills from western Venezuela to northern Peru.

- Iphiclus atricaudatus (Kuhnt, 1910)
- Iphiclus bisignatus (Guérin-Méneville, 1841)
- Iphiclus dispilotus (Lacordaire, 1842)
- Iphiclus ecuadorensis (Crotch, 1876)
- Iphiclus ellipticus (Kuhnt, 1910)
- Iphiclus luscus (Erichson, 1847)
- Iphiclus oblongosignatus (Guérin-Méneville, 1844)

=== Additional species ===
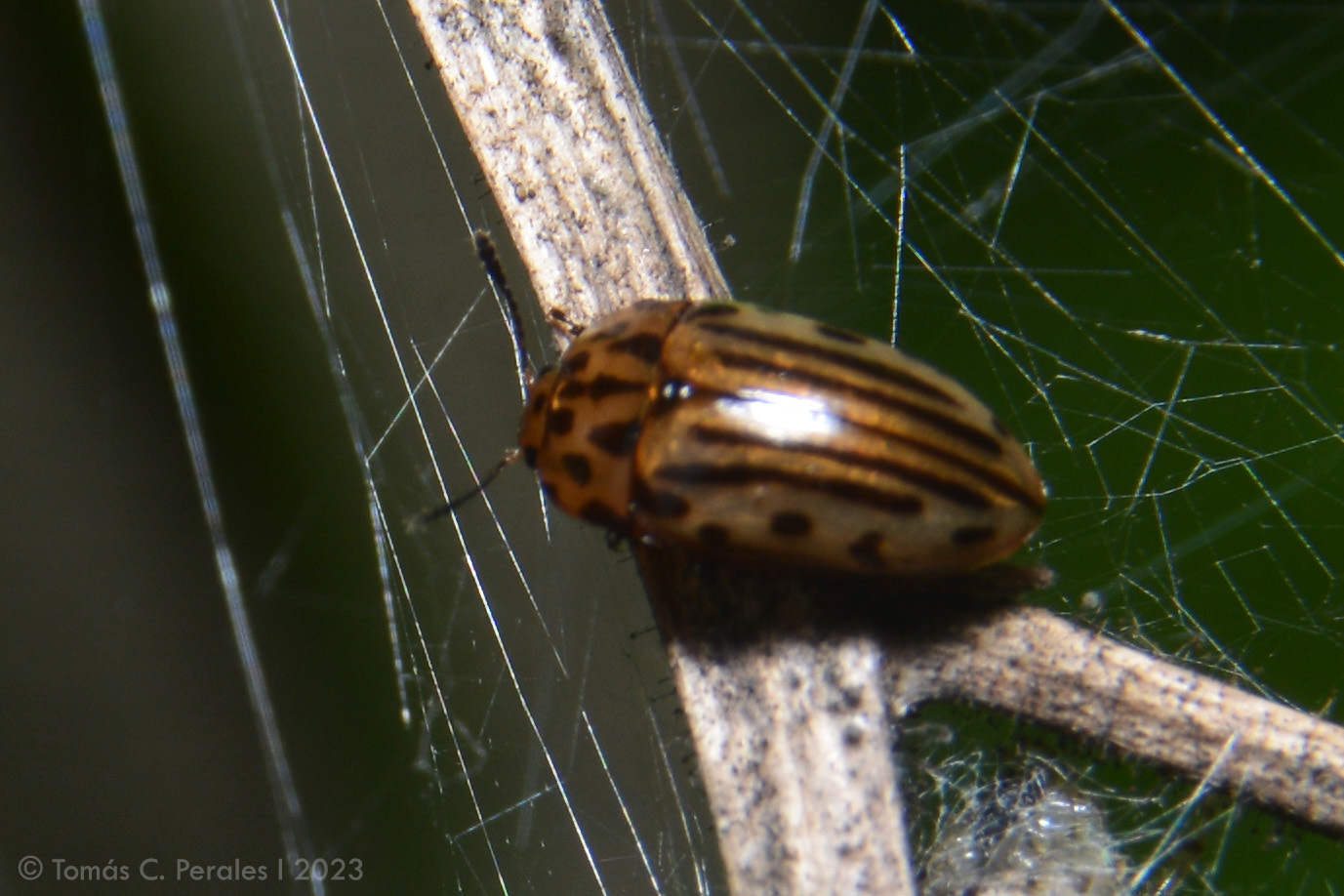
The enigmatic Iphiclus virgatus

Iphiclus virgatus was long placed in genus Mycotretus, but while it does seem to belong into Iphiclus, as of 2023 its precise relationships were still undetermined.

As can be expected from a widespread and highly diverse Neotropical beetle genus, undescribed species may still exist. A review of the UPN collection found 16 identifiable species represented among the 69 Colombian Iphiclus specimens, with Cundinamarca Department featuring all but 3 of the recognized species. In addition, 12 specimens (about 17%) from southern and central Colombia could be identified as Iphiclus, but not assigned to a species known from the region.

During an earlier review of the famous George Crotch collection at the UMZC, about 425 confirmed or presumed Iphiclus (in Crotch's time, Brachysphoenus) were counted, with roughly 130 species present; only about 15 of these were represented by more than a handful of specimens, however. Of these, the Iphiclus (Neobarytopus) I.quinquefasciatus, I.nigropictus and I.odyneroides with, respectively, 15, 12 and 11 specimens, as well as the Iphiclus (Iphiclus) I.abdominalis and the Iphiclus (Saccomorphus) I.haematocephalus with 12 specimens each are most abundantly represented. In addition, about 13% of Crotch's "Brachysphoenus" were still unidentified by the end of the 20th century. These consist of two sets of five specimens representing four species altogether – two presumed by Crotch to be Iphiclus (Neobarytopus) close to I.batesi and/or I.geometra, and two putative Iphiclus (Brachymerus) –, 30 specimens (number of species unknown) of possible Iphiclus (Habrodactylus), and 14 specimens which Crotch considered either Iphiclus (Neobarytopus) of unclear affiliations or incertae sedis within the genus when he last sorted them (they were pinned between all other of his "Brachysphoenus" and his "Typocephalus"). Most intriguing is a single suspected Iphiclus (Sternolobus); it has a prepared "TYPE" label which is otherwise blank, and appears to have been one of the beetles Crotch prepared to describe as new species when he died in 1874 only 32 years old.

A beetle described by Johan Fabricius as "Erotylus unifasciatus" was tentatively placed in "Brachysphoenus" (Morphoides) by Leopold Mader, who considered it undeterminable after consulting Jean Lacordaire's 1842 Erotylidae monograph, commenting "it would be for the best if such dubious and insufficiently described species could be altogether deleted ftom the catalogues". However, Mader had overlooked Louis Chevrolat's 1843 study, in which Fabricius' beetle was identified as the Tenebrionidae species now known as Cuphotes cinctus, which is deceptively similar to some Erotylinae.
