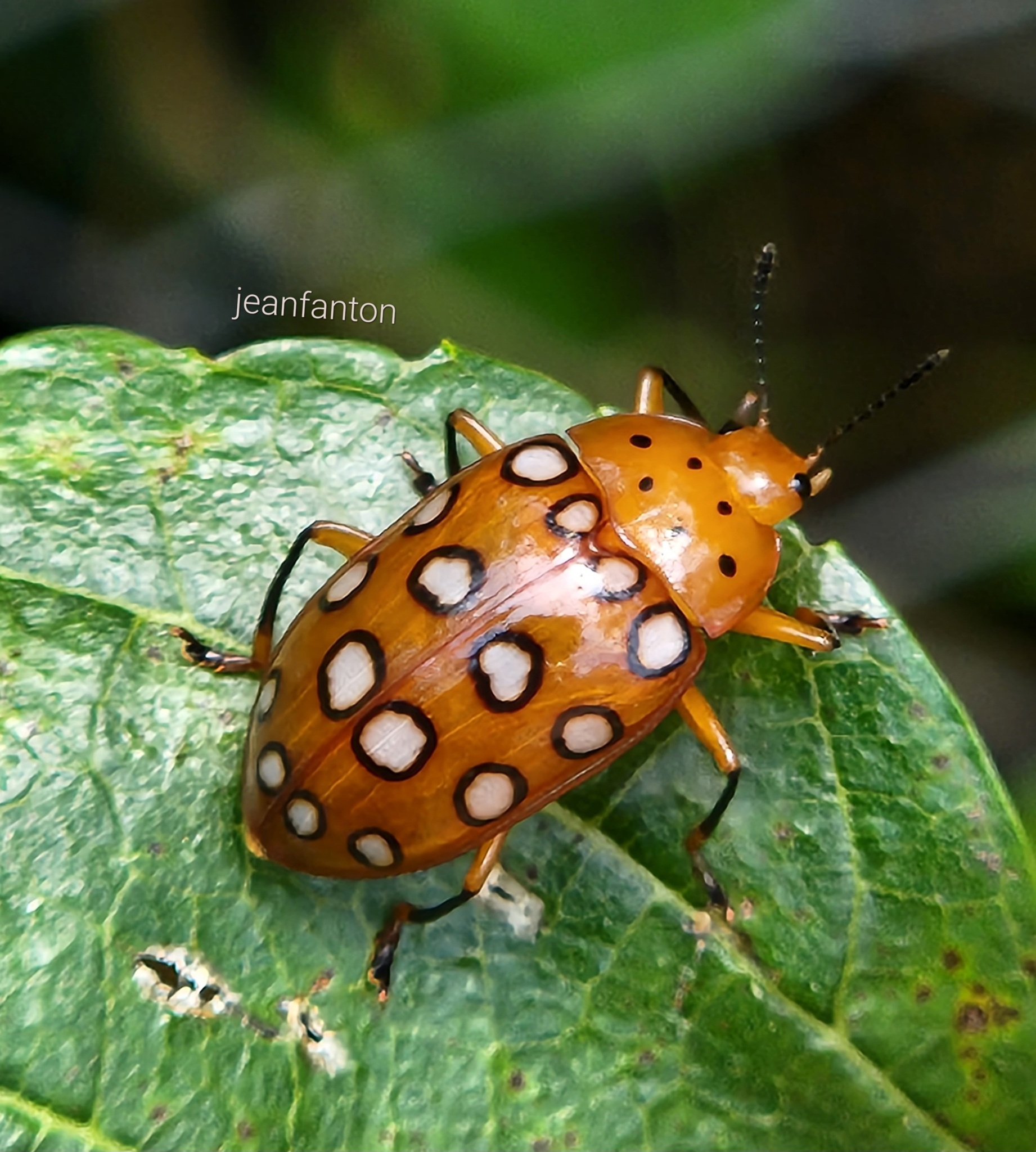
- Adult on Unicamp main campus (São Paulo, Brazil)

Scientific classification
- Kingdom: Animalia
- Phylum: Arthropoda
- Clade: Pancrustacea
- Class: Insecta
- Order: Coleoptera
- Suborder: Polyphaga
- Infraorder: Cucujiformia
- Family: Erotylidae
- Genus: Iphiclus
- Species: I. sedecimmaculatus

Binomial name
- Iphiclus sedecimmaculatus Buquet, 1840

Synonyms
- Brachysphoenus sedecimmaculatus (Buquet, 1840); Scaphidomorphus sedecimmaculatus (Buquet, 1840)

= Iphiclus sedecimmaculatus =

Species of beetle

Iphiclus sedecimmaculatus is a Neotropical species of pleasing fungus beetle (family Erotylidae) described by Jean Buquet in 1840. Within its family, it belongs to subfamily Erotylinae.

This species occurs in the eastern foothills of the Andes, from Panama through Colombia, Peru and Brazil, to the lowlands of Paraguay.

== Description ==
I.sedecimmaculatus adults measure about 10-12 mm in length, and around 5.5 mm in width. Like most other members of subgenus Iphiclus (Iphiclus) they have a reddish-brownish pronotum, spotted black as in several of their closest relatives, unlike the all-black pronotum the somewhat more distantly related Erotylina. In this species, there are 6 pronotal spots, arranged in a crosswise ellipse with two spots at the outside and four in the center. The elytra have evenly-spaced weak lengthwise stripes and are also reddish-brown. They bear prominent yellowish-white eyespots, usually 16 in number and arranged in four crosswise rows of two spots per elytron.

Two varieties have been named, Iphiclus sedecimmaculatus var. concentratus by George Crotch in 1876, and I.s. var. discedens by Paul Kuhnt in 1910. The concentratus variety are small individuals with more deeply impressed elytra stripes and small wingspots which have a rather white center. Kuhnt's discedens has only the wingspots of the first row are distinct; the spots in the other three rows are enlarged sideways to form coherent wavy bars, with the thin black border running all around.

== Systematics and ecology ==
In the (possibly paraphyletic) genus, I.sedecimmaculatus is placed in the nominate subgenus Iphiclus (Iphiclus), which is possibly more closely related to genus Erotylina than to other lineages traditionally placed in Iphiclus.

Buquet's type specimen, now in the MNHN collection, was from "Colombia" – at that time the Republic of New Granada, which was much larger than the present-day Colombian state. Many early 19th-century authors used "Colombia" for roughly the same area as today's country, and "Nova Granada" (or similar) for indeterminable localities in the historical country, but it is not clear how Buquet (who was more of a trader in specimens than a describer of species) did it. George Crotch had an I.sedecimmaculatus in his collection which he initially believed to be Buquet's type and labeled it accordingly, but this label was then struck out and the specimen identified as having been acquired from Louis Reiche.

Crotch's type specimen of I.s. var. concentratus, attributed to Henry Bates, is still in the Crotch collection at the UMZC; it is supposedly from "Colombia" too, but Bates' specimens are usually from the vicinity of Tefé in western Brazil – more than 500 km from the Colombian border today, but only about 150 km in Bates' time. Kuhnt's type of I.s. var. discedens, stored in the MNB collection today, is from an undetermined locality.

This beetle feeds on polypores (shelf fungi) as larvae and adults, as is typical for Erotylidae.

In Colombia, it seems to be a moderately common Iphiclus, but maybe the most common of its subgenus: A review of the UPN collection found 6 I.sedecimmaculatus among the 57 Colombian Iphiclus identifiable to species. Of the 16 Iphiclus species represented in this collection, only I.(Neobarytopus) quinquefasciatus and I.(Saccomorphus) haematocephalus were more abundant. The I.sedecimmaculatus collection localities were in Cundinamarca, Meta and Tolima departments, i.e. the eastern slope of the Andes near Bogotá in the center of the country.
