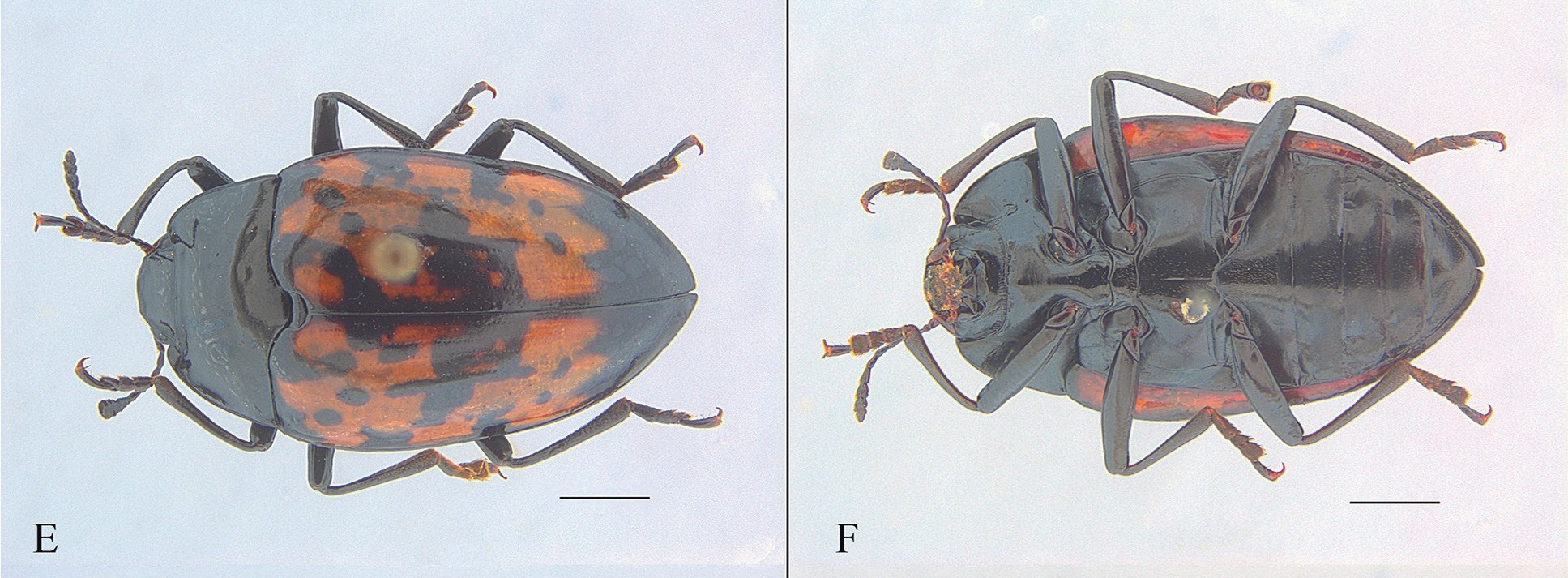

Scientific classification
- Kingdom: Animalia
- Phylum: Arthropoda
- Clade: Pancrustacea
- Class: Insecta
- Order: Coleoptera
- Suborder: Polyphaga
- Infraorder: Cucujiformia
- Family: Erotylidae
- Genus: Iphiclus
- Species: I. adustus

Binomial name
- Iphiclus adustus (Duponchel, 1825)

Synonyms
- see text

= Iphiclus adustus =

Species of beetle

Iphiclus adustus is a species of beetle of the Erotylidae family. This species is apparently endemic to Santa Catarina in southeastern Brazil.

In the huge and probably polyphyletic genus Iphiclus, this species is placed in subgenus Neobarytopus. For some time, this subgenus was erroneously known as Brachymerus, because I.nitidulus, assumed to be a close ally of I.adustus, was considered the type species of that subgenus. But the type of Brachymerus is the originally-designated I.tibialis, which is not considered a close relative of I.adustus. Hence, the old name Neobarytopus again takes over for the group around its type species I.tricinctus, which is considered to include I.nitidulus and I.adustus. As for all Iphiclus and allies, however, this placement is provisional, pending a thorough review.

Invalid junior synonyms of this beetle are:

- Brachysphaenus adustus (Duponchel, 1825)
- Brachysphoenus adustus (Duponchel, 1825)
- Erotylus adustus Duponchel, 1825
- Morphoides adustus (Duponchel, 1825)
