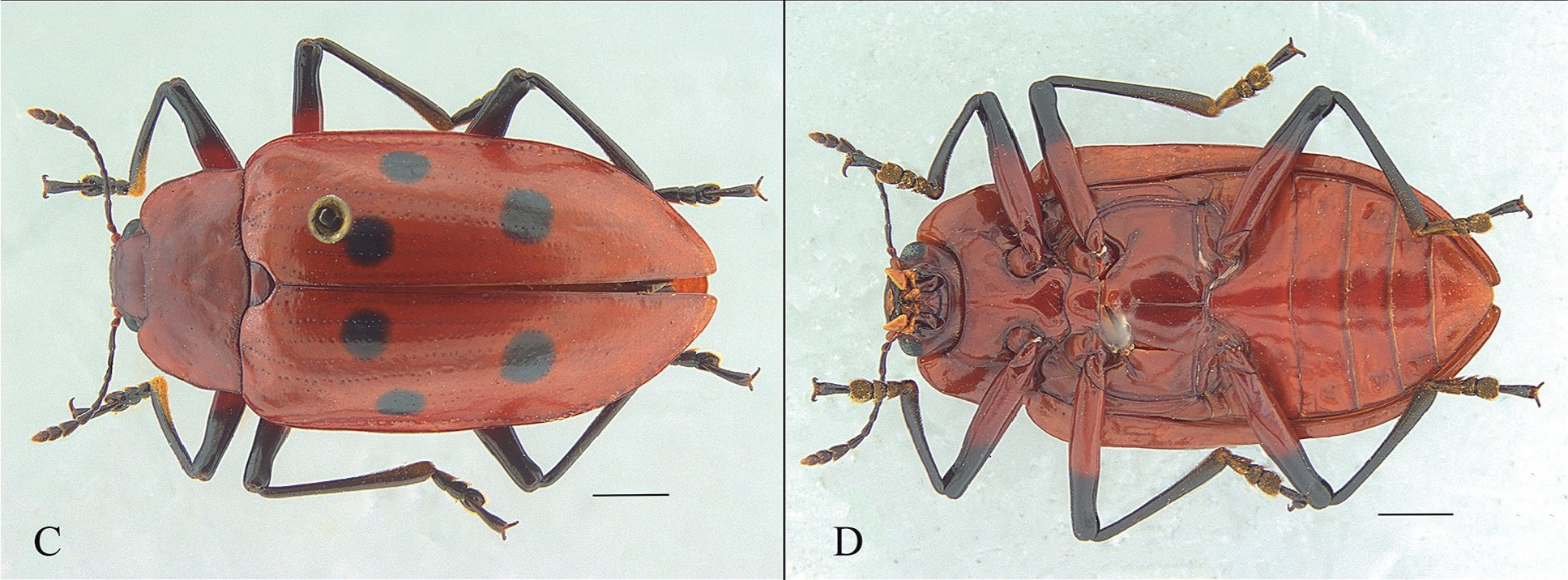

Scientific classification
- Kingdom: Animalia
- Phylum: Arthropoda
- Clade: Pancrustacea
- Class: Insecta
- Order: Coleoptera
- Suborder: Polyphaga
- Infraorder: Cucujiformia
- Family: Erotylidae
- Genus: Iphiclus
- Species: I. sexpunctatus

Binomial name
- Iphiclus sexpunctatus (Duponchel, 1825)

Synonyms
- Brachysphoenus sexpunctatus (Duponchel, 1825); Erotylus sexpunctatus Duponchel, 1825

= Iphiclus sexpunctatus =

Species of beetle

Iphiclus sexpunctatus is a species of beetle of the Erotylidae family. This species is found in southeastern and southern Brazil.
