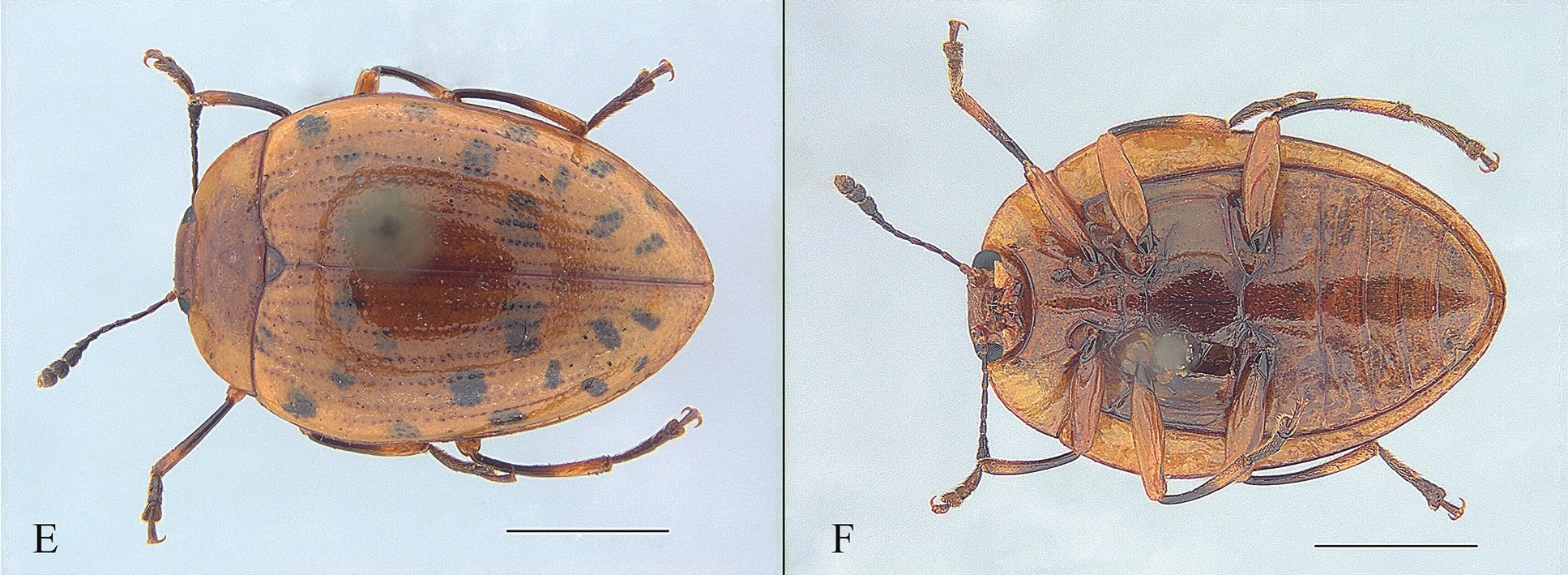

Scientific classification
- Kingdom: Animalia
- Phylum: Arthropoda
- Clade: Pancrustacea
- Class: Insecta
- Order: Coleoptera
- Suborder: Polyphaga
- Infraorder: Cucujiformia
- Family: Erotylidae
- Genus: Iphiclus
- Species: I. annulatus

Binomial name
- Iphiclus annulatus (Germar, 1824)

Synonyms
- Brachysphoenus annulatus (Germar, 1824); Erotylus annulatus Germar, 1824

= Iphiclus annulatus =

Species of beetle

Iphiclus annulatus is a species of beetle of the Erotylidae family. This species is found in southeastern and southern Brazil.
