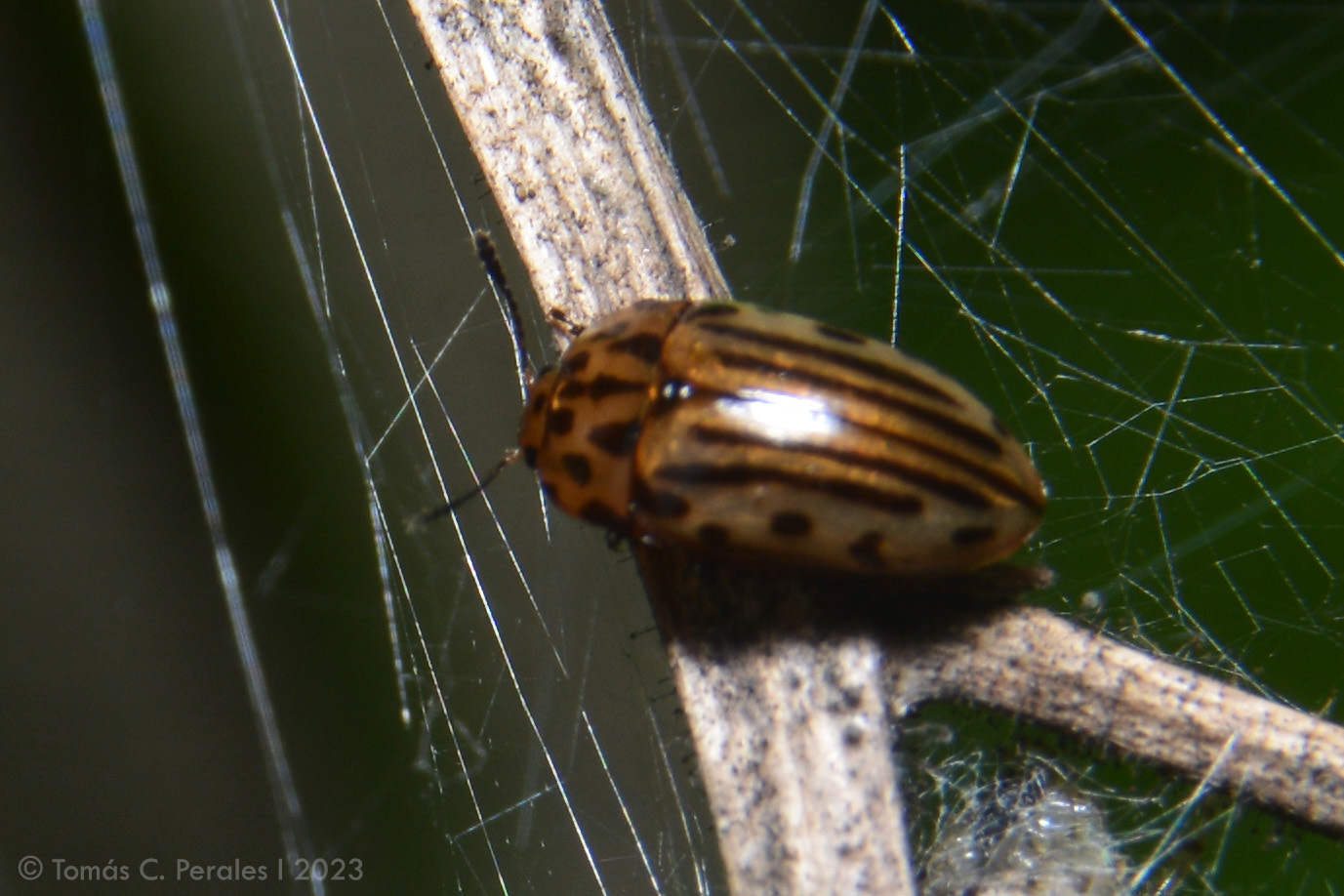
- In La Caldera Department, Argentina

Scientific classification
- Kingdom: Animalia
- Phylum: Arthropoda
- Clade: Pancrustacea
- Class: Insecta
- Order: Coleoptera
- Suborder: Polyphaga
- Infraorder: Cucujiformia
- Family: Erotylidae
- Genus: Iphiclus
- Species: I. virgatus

Binomial name
- Iphiclus virgatus (Kuhnt, 1910)

Synonyms
- Mycotretus virgatus Kuhnt, 1910

= Iphiclus virgatus =

Species of beetle

Iphiclus virgatus is a species of beetle of the Erotylidae family. This species is found in southeastern and southern Brazil and apparently also northern Argentina.

It was historically placed in Mycotretus, but does seem to be a true Iphiclus of uncertain affiliations within its genus. Traits that distinguish it from Mycotretes species are the smooth upperside without dimples or impressed lines, the mouthparts showing a triangular mentum and an expanded triangular final maxillary palpomere, the narrowed posterior aedeagus lobe, and the lack of laminae and a narrowed stalk of the inner (body cavity) side of the metathorax sternite.
