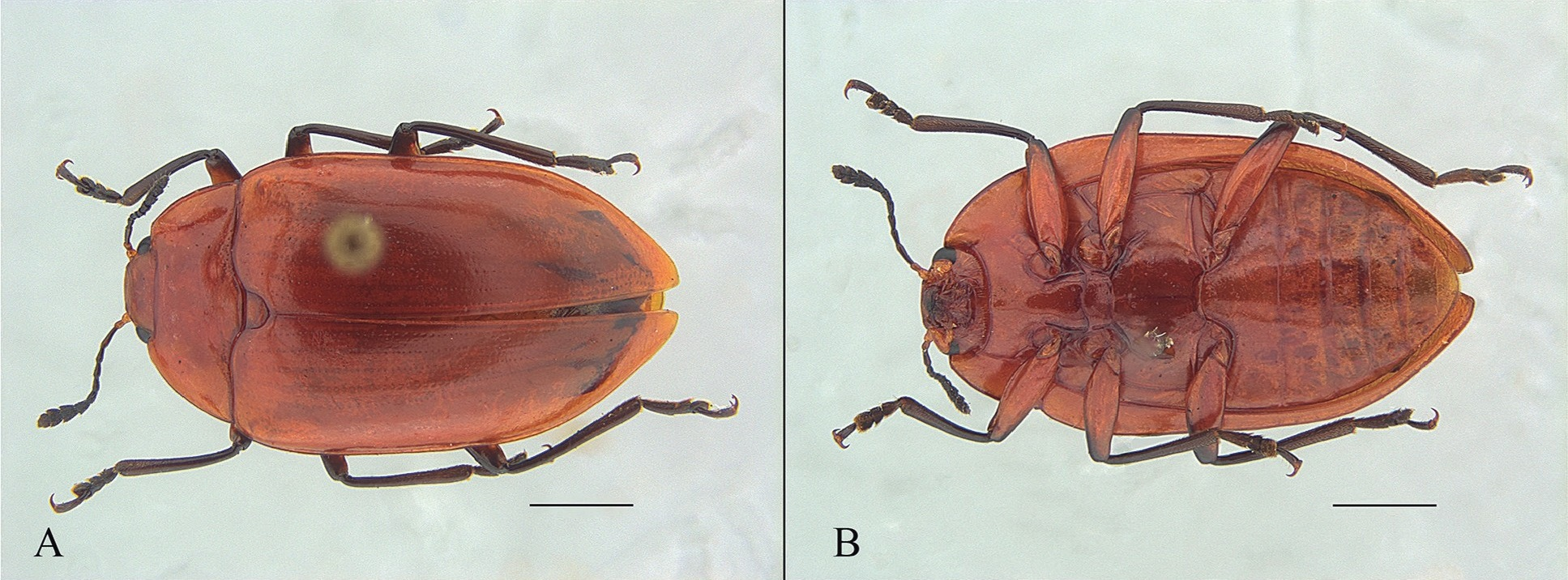

Scientific classification
- Kingdom: Animalia
- Phylum: Arthropoda
- Clade: Pancrustacea
- Class: Insecta
- Order: Coleoptera
- Suborder: Polyphaga
- Infraorder: Cucujiformia
- Family: Erotylidae
- Genus: Iphiclus
- Species: I. rubidus

Binomial name
- Iphiclus rubidus (Duponchel, 1825)

Synonyms
- Brachysphoenus rubidus (Duponchel, 1825); Erotylus rubidus Duponchel, 1825

= Iphiclus rubidus =

Species of beetle

Iphiclus rubidus is a species of beetle of the Erotylidae family. This species is found in southeastern and southern Brazil, as well as in the states of Paraíba and Sergipe.
