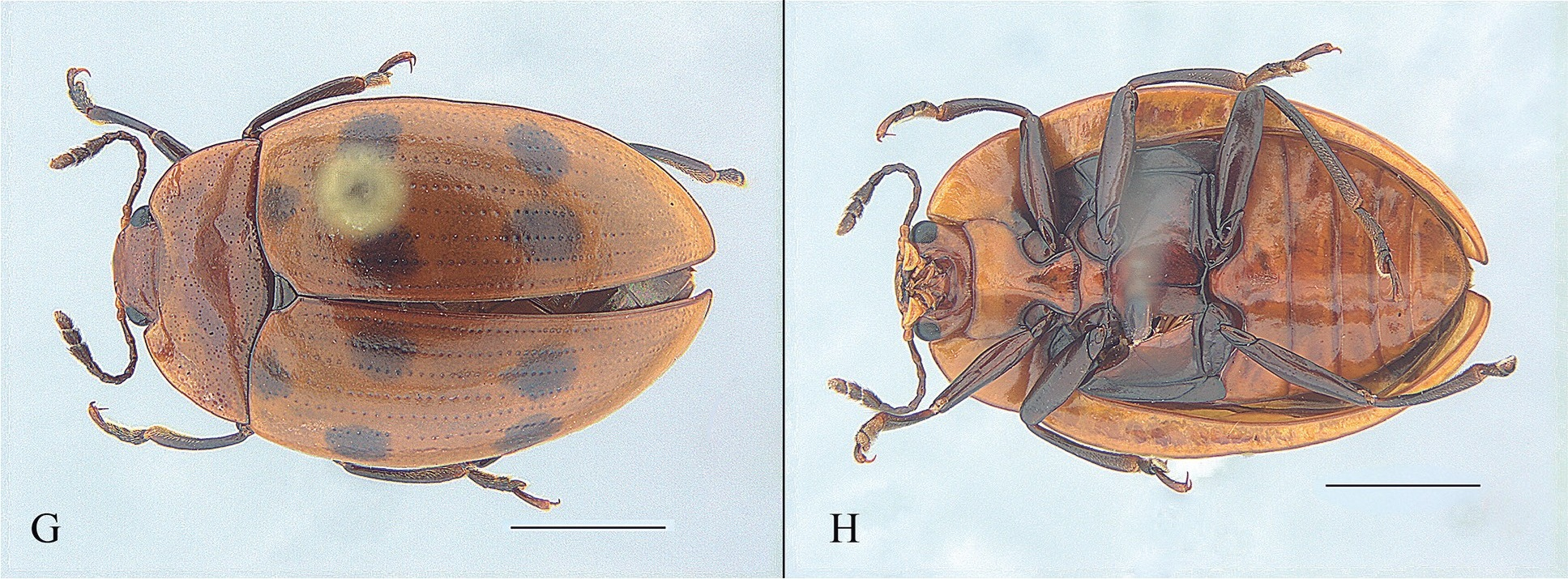

Scientific classification
- Kingdom: Animalia
- Phylum: Arthropoda
- Clade: Pancrustacea
- Class: Insecta
- Order: Coleoptera
- Suborder: Polyphaga
- Infraorder: Cucujiformia
- Family: Erotylidae
- Genus: Iphiclus
- Species: I. decempunctatus

Binomial name
- Iphiclus decempunctatus (Duponchel, 1825)

Synonyms
- Brachysphoenus decempunctatus (Duponchel, 1825); Erotylus decempunctatus Duponchel, 1825

= Iphiclus decempunctatus =

Species of beetle

Iphiclus decempunctatus is a species of beetle of the Erotylidae family. This species is found in southeastern Brazil, as well as in the state of Santa Catarina.

A variety, Iphiclus decempunctatus var. quadristictus, was named by Guérin in 1956; it is nowadays treated as subspecies.
