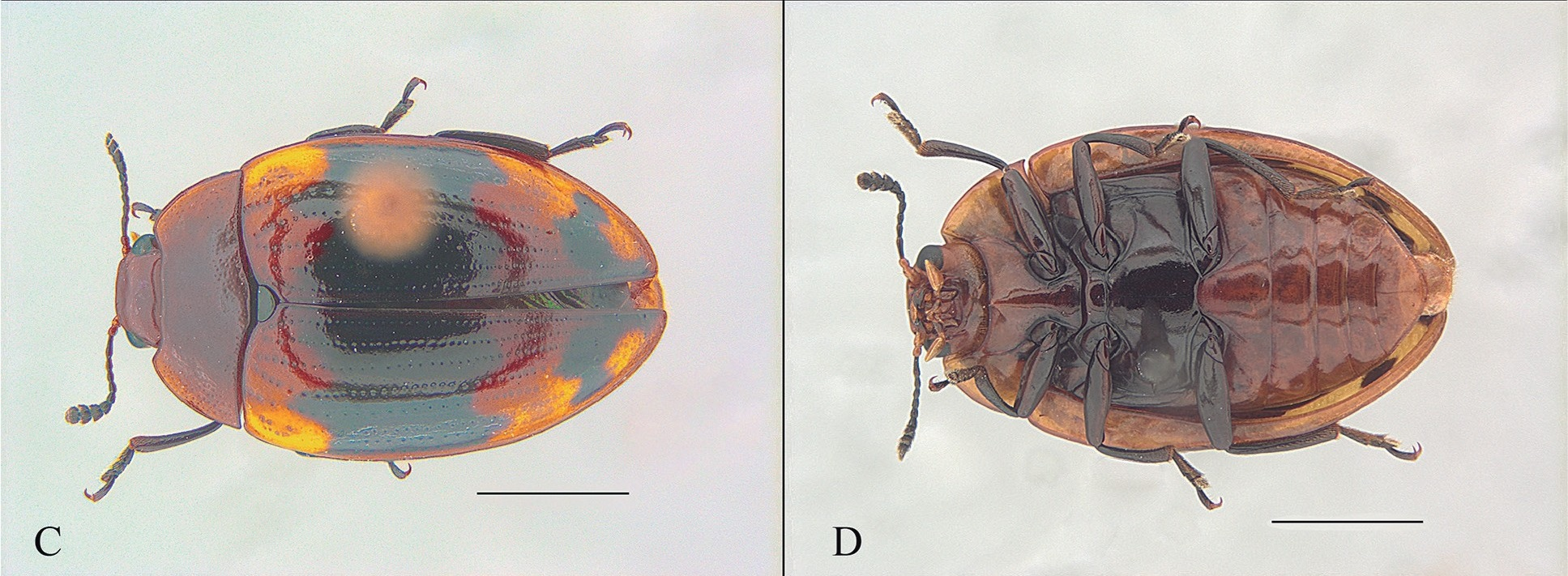

Scientific classification
- Kingdom: Animalia
- Phylum: Arthropoda
- Clade: Pancrustacea
- Class: Insecta
- Order: Coleoptera
- Suborder: Polyphaga
- Infraorder: Cucujiformia
- Family: Erotylidae
- Genus: Iphiclus
- Species: I. hoffmani

Binomial name
- Iphiclus hoffmani (Lacordaire, 1842)

Synonyms
- Brachysphoenus hoffmani Lacordaire, 1842; Iphiclus hoffmanni (lapsus)

= Iphiclus hoffmani =

Species of beetle

Iphiclus hoffmani is a species of beetle of the Erotylidae family. This species is found in southeastern and southern Brazil.

A variety, Iphiclus hoffmani var. reductus, was named by Guérin in 1956; it is nowadays treated as subspecies.
