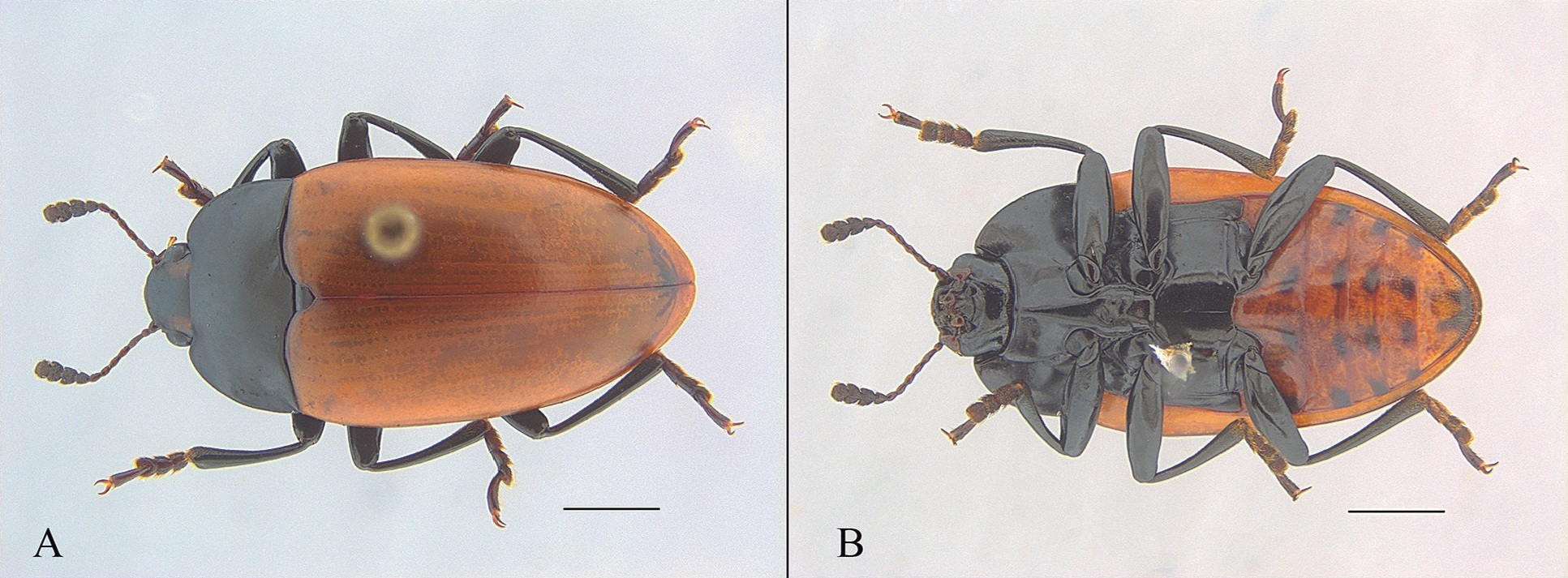
- Adult of the haematopterus variety

Scientific classification
- Kingdom: Animalia
- Phylum: Arthropoda
- Clade: Pancrustacea
- Class: Insecta
- Order: Coleoptera
- Suborder: Polyphaga
- Infraorder: Cucujiformia
- Family: Erotylidae
- Genus: Iphiclus
- Species: I. dorsonotatus

Binomial name
- Iphiclus dorsonotatus (Lacordaire, 1842)

Synonyms
- See text

= Iphiclus dorsonotatus =

Species of beetle

Iphiclus dorsonotatus is a species of beetle of the Erotylidae family. This species is found in Colombia and Brazil. Within its family, it belongs to subfamily Erotylinae.

== Description ==
Adult I.dorsonotatus are about 11-11.5 mm long and 6.5 mm wide, and their exoskeleton has a silky sheen. Except for elytra and abdomen, they are overall black in color. Elytra and abdomen are brick red, as are two dots on the top of the head next to each compound eye. The elytra have lengthwise stripes composed of small punctuations, and usually a large crosswise black spot in the forward half, that extends across the middle but neither reaches the sides nor the front edges of the elytra or the black scutellum. When Jean Lacordaire established I.dorsonotatus in 1842, he also described a supposedly distinct closely related species lacking the black wingspot. Lacordaire's type specimen is in the famous George Crotch collection at the UMZC; when Crotch reviewed the "species" in 1876, he discovered it was merely an individual variety, Iphiclus dorsonotatus var. haematopterus.

I.atriventris and I.columbiae from the northern Andes are similar to I.d. var. haematopterus but slightly larger, with an all-black underside and a very glossy pronotum. Several other close relatives are also generally similar in color, including a reddish abdomen, but these all lack the red spots on the head; most alike is an unspotted variety of the Peruvian I.bicolor which – apart from its all-black head – can be recognized by its dull, non-shiny exoskeleton. "Typical" I.dorsonotatus are easily recognized among their close relatives by the shape and position of the wingspot. Somewhat similar species like the putative close relative I.pyrrhocephalus from Brazil and the more distantly related I.ruficeps (Colombia to Peru) can be distinguished by their fully red heads.

== Systematics and distribution ==
In the huge and probably polyphyletic genus Iphiclus, this species is placed in subgenus Brachymerus. For some time, this was erroneously known as Neomorphoides, because I.nitidulus, not considered particularly close to I.dorsonotatus and now in subgenus Neobarytopus, was believed to be the type species of Brachymerus. But the type of this subgenus is the originally-designated I.tibialis, which is assumed to be a close relative of I.dorsonotatus. As for all Iphiclus and allies, however, this placement is provisional, pending a thorough review.

Invalid junior synonyms of this beetle are:

- Brachysphaenus dorsonotatus (Lacordaire, 1842)
- Brachysphoenus dorsonotatus Lacordaire, 1842
- Brachysphaenus haematopterus (Lacordaire, 1842)
- Brachysphoenus haematopterus Lacordaire, 1842
- Morphoides dorsonotatus (Lacordaire, 1842)
- Morphoides dorsonotatus var. haematopterus (Lacordaire, 1842)
- Morphoides haematopterus (Lacordaire, 1842)

The range of I.dorsonotatus is not well understood. Historical records are quite rare; the comprehensive George Crotch collection at the UMZC only has one wing-spotted specimen, as well as the type specimen of the spotless variant acquired from the Jean Lacordaire collection. Similarly, the large Naturalis collection has a single specimen of the spotted form; neither this nor the Crotch collection specimens have any locality data. The type specimen of I.dorsonotatus may be lost; Lacordaire said to have received it from "Colombia" – at that time the Republic of New Granada, which was much larger than the present-day Colombian state. While many early 19th-century authors used "Colombia" for roughly the same area as today's country, and "Nova Granada" (or similar) for indeterminable localities in the historical country, Lacordaire gave precise localities whenever he had them, and in general apparently only used "Colombie", not "Nouvelle-Grenade". Additional specimens are known from Brazil, and without recent Colombian speciems it even cannot be ruled out that Lacordaire's "Colombie" type was from the northwest of present-day Brazil.
