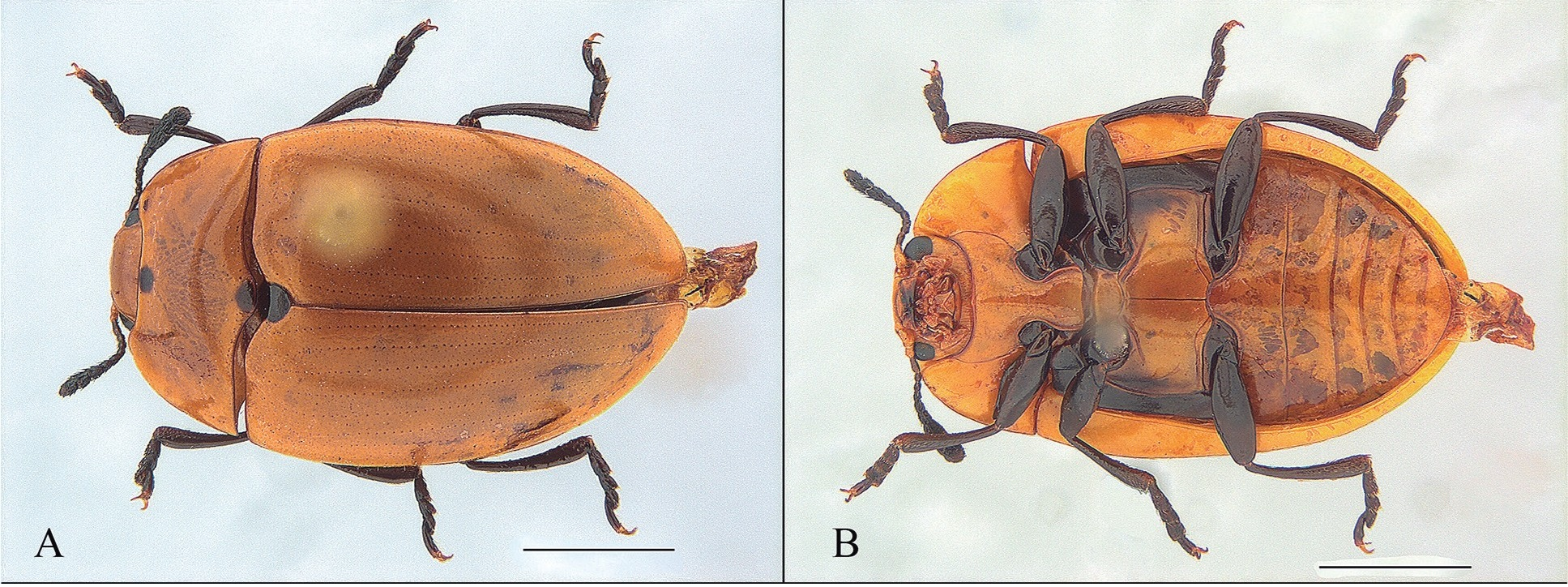

Scientific classification
- Kingdom: Animalia
- Phylum: Arthropoda
- Clade: Pancrustacea
- Class: Insecta
- Order: Coleoptera
- Suborder: Polyphaga
- Infraorder: Cucujiformia
- Family: Erotylidae
- Genus: Iphiclus
- Species: I. fuscipes

Binomial name
- Iphiclus fuscipes (Duponchel, 1825)

Synonyms
- Brachysphoenus fuscipes (Duponchel, 1825); Erotylus fuscipes Duponchel, 1825

= Iphiclus fuscipes =

Species of beetle

Iphiclus fuscipes is a species of beetle of the Erotylidae family. This species is found in southeastern and southern Brazil.
