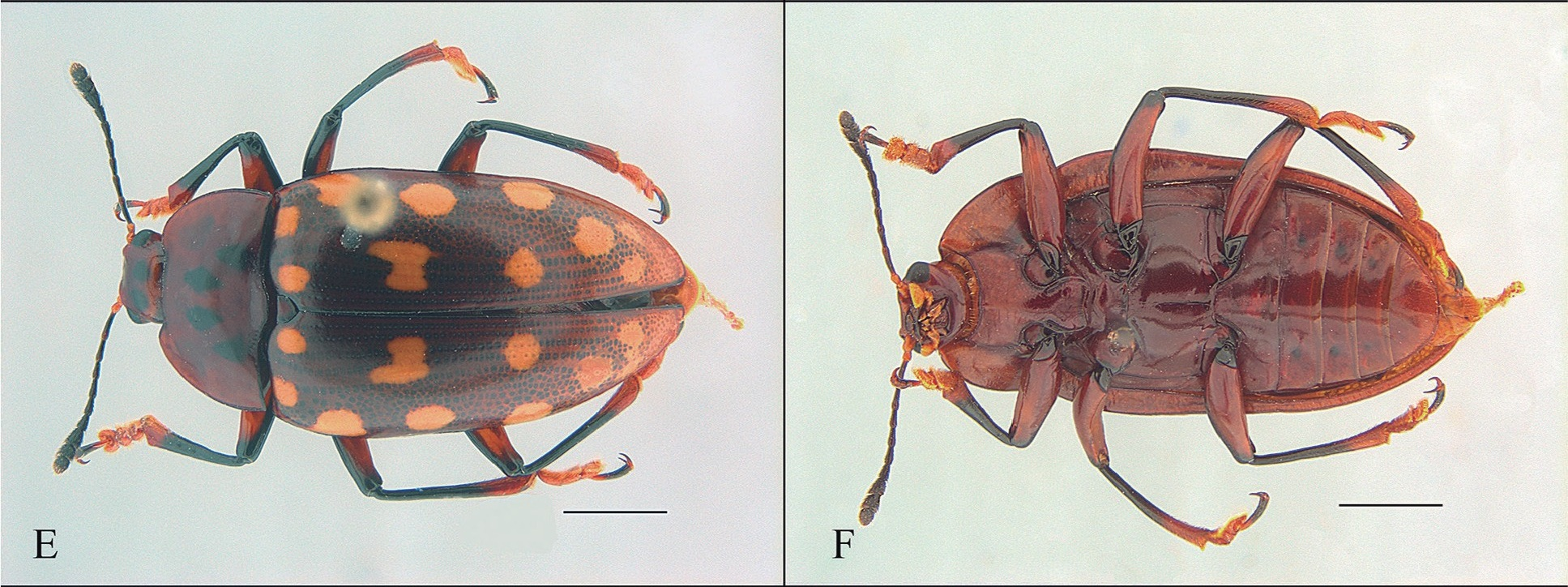

Scientific classification
- Kingdom: Animalia
- Phylum: Arthropoda
- Clade: Pancrustacea
- Class: Insecta
- Order: Coleoptera
- Suborder: Polyphaga
- Infraorder: Cucujiformia
- Family: Erotylidae
- Genus: Iphiclus
- Species: I. vigintipunctatus

Binomial name
- Iphiclus vigintipunctatus (Olivier, 1792)

Synonyms
- Brachysphoenus vigintiguttatus (Germar, 1824); Brachysphoenus vigintipunctatus (Olivier, 1792); Erotylus vigintiguttatus Germar, 1824; Erotylus vigintiguttatus Duponchel, 1825 (non Germar, 1824: preoccupied); Erotylus vigintipunctatus Olivier, 1792

= Iphiclus vigintipunctatus =

Species of beetle

Iphiclus vigintipunctatus is a species of beetle of the Erotylidae family. This species is found in northern and southeastern Brazil and Suriname.

A variety, Iphiclus vigintipunctatus var. castaneus, was named by Guérin in 1956; it is nowadays treated as subspecies.
