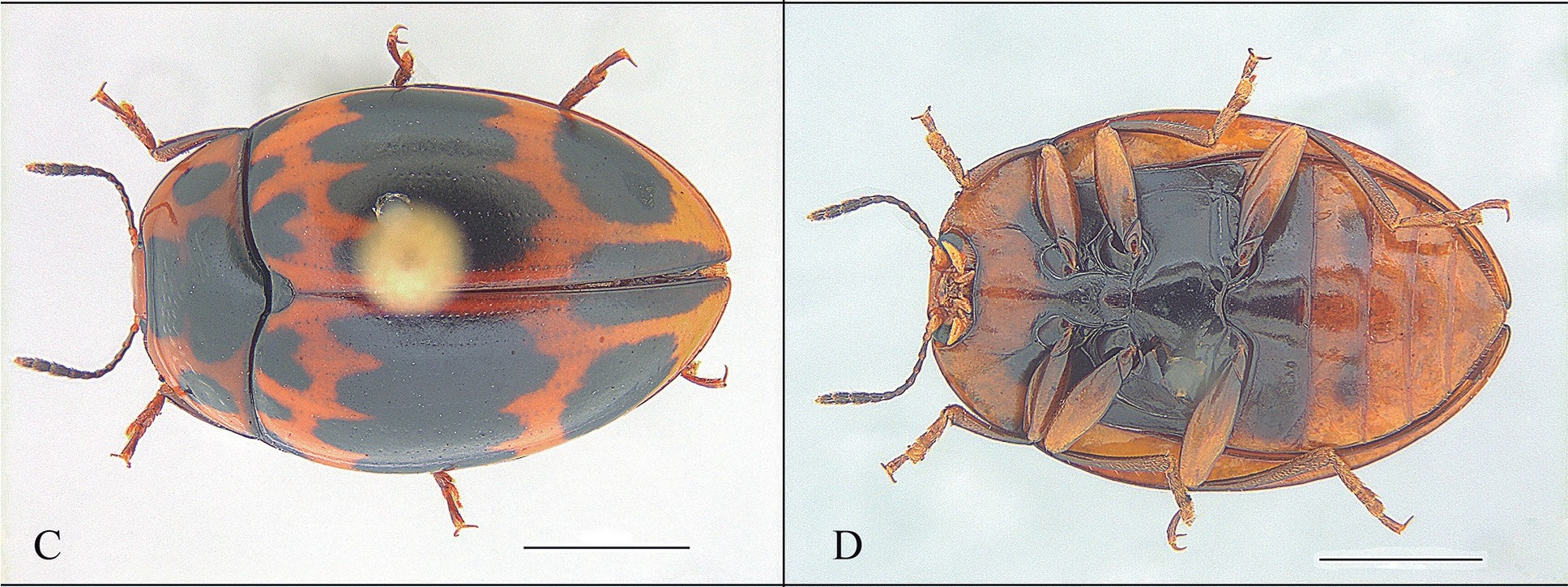

Scientific classification
- Kingdom: Animalia
- Phylum: Arthropoda
- Clade: Pancrustacea
- Class: Insecta
- Order: Coleoptera
- Suborder: Polyphaga
- Infraorder: Cucujiformia
- Family: Erotylidae
- Genus: Iphiclus
- Species: I. signatus

Binomial name
- Iphiclus signatus (Duponchel, 1825)

Synonyms
- Brachymerus amabilis Guérin-Méneville, 1841; Brachysphoenus amabilis (Guérin-Méneville, 1841); Brachysphoenus signatus (Duponchel, 1825); Erotylus signatus Duponchel, 1825

= Iphiclus signatus =

Species of beetle

Iphiclus signatus is a species of beetle of the Erotylidae family. This species is found in southeastern and southern Brazil, as well as in the states of Amazonas, Rondônia and Bahia.

This is the type species of subgenus Megaprotus.
