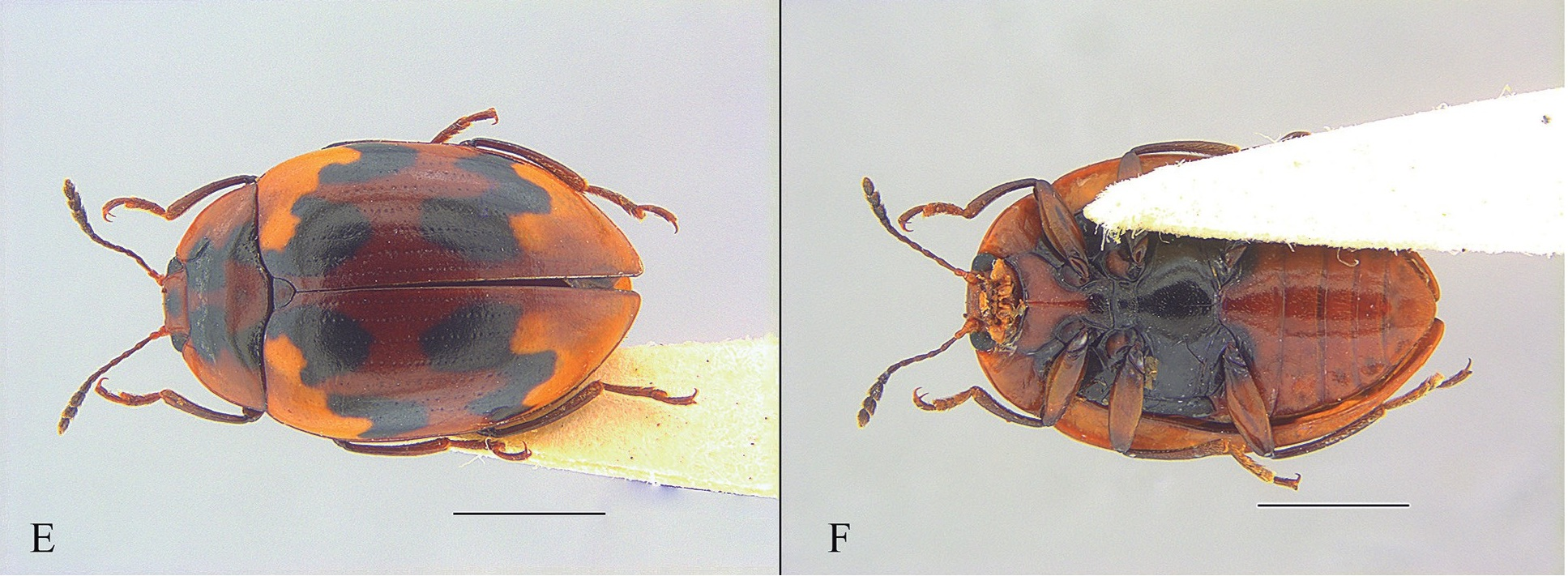

Scientific classification
- Kingdom: Animalia
- Phylum: Arthropoda
- Clade: Pancrustacea
- Class: Insecta
- Order: Coleoptera
- Suborder: Polyphaga
- Infraorder: Cucujiformia
- Family: Erotylidae
- Genus: Iphiclus
- Species: I. sulphurifer

Binomial name
- Iphiclus sulphurifer (Lacordaire, 1842)

Synonyms
- Brachysphoenus sulphurifer Lacordaire, 1842

= Iphiclus sulphurifer =

Species of beetle

Iphiclus sulphurifer is a species of beetle of the Erotylidae family. This species is found in southeastern and southern Brazil.

This is the type species of subgenus Habrodactylus.
