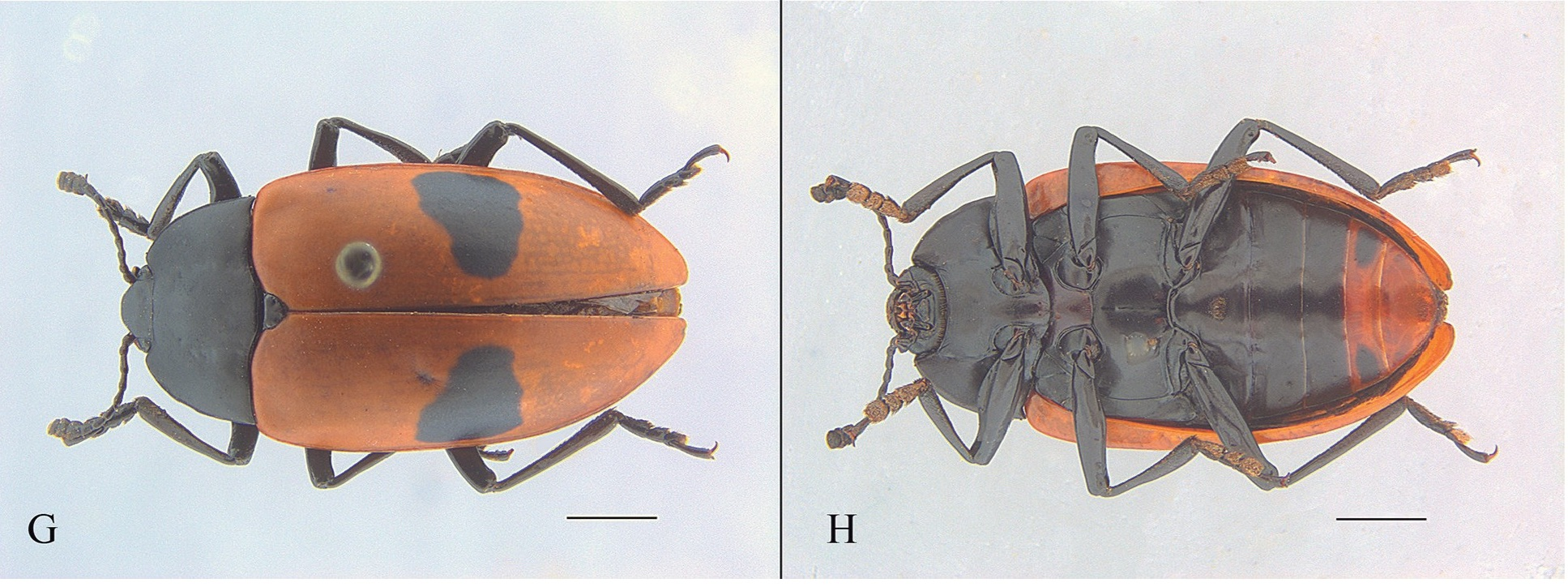

Scientific classification
- Kingdom: Animalia
- Phylum: Arthropoda
- Clade: Pancrustacea
- Class: Insecta
- Order: Coleoptera
- Suborder: Polyphaga
- Infraorder: Cucujiformia
- Family: Erotylidae
- Genus: Iphiclus
- Species: I. bimaculatus

Binomial name
- Iphiclus bimaculatus (Fabricius, 1775)

Synonyms
- Brachysphoenus bimaculatus (Fabricius, 1775); Charidemus bimaculatus (Fabricius, 1775); Chrysomela bimaculata Fabricius, 1775; Erotylus bimaculatus (Fabricius, 1775)

= Iphiclus bimaculatus =

Species of beetle

Iphiclus bimaculatus is a species of beetle of the Erotylidae family. This species is found in southern and southeastern Brazil, as well as the state of Goiás.
