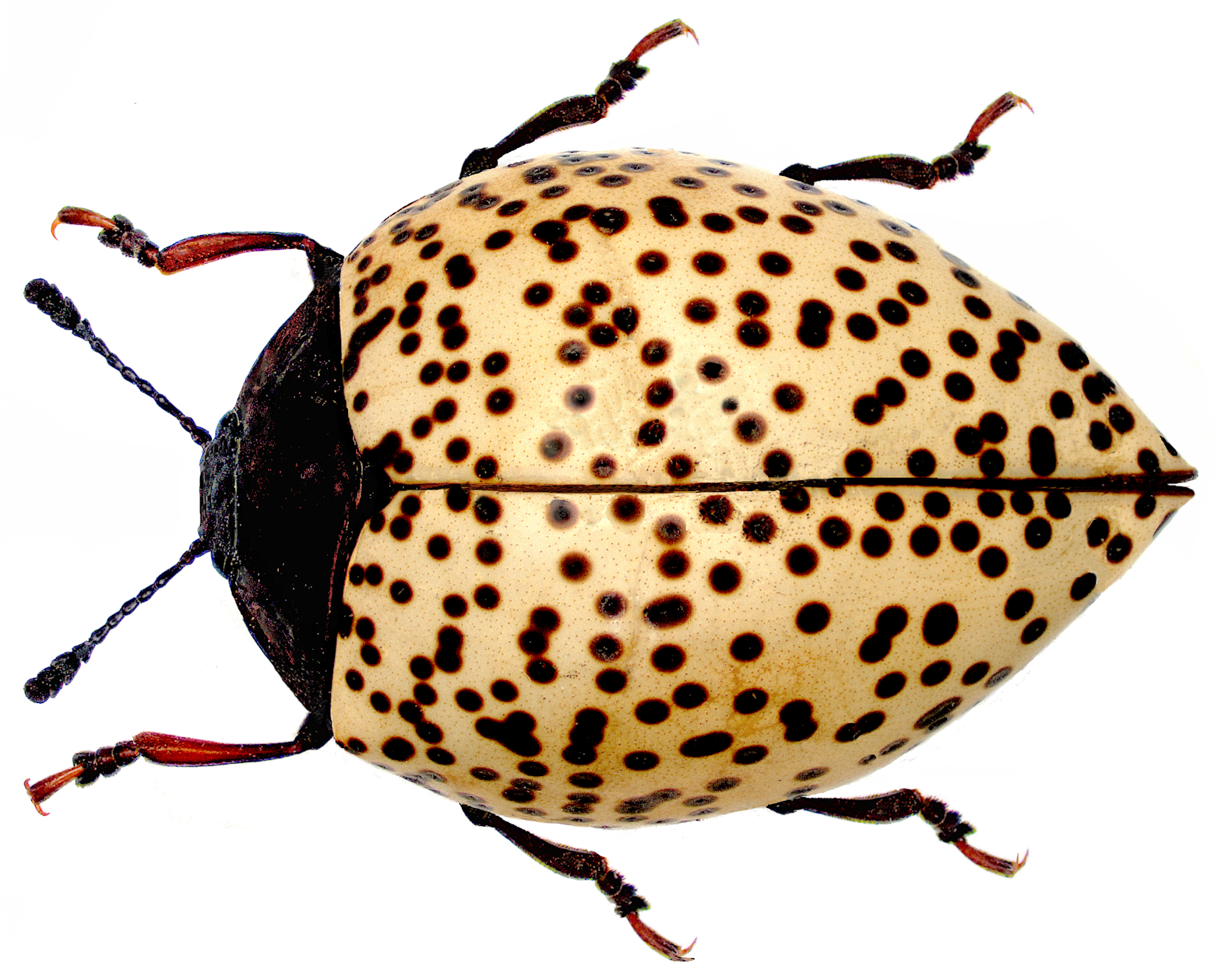
- Aegithus burmeisteri from Manu National Park, Peru

Scientific classification
- Kingdom: Animalia
- Phylum: Arthropoda
- Clade: Pancrustacea
- Class: Insecta
- Order: Coleoptera
- Suborder: Polyphaga
- Infraorder: Cucujiformia
- Family: Erotylidae
- Genus: Aegithus; Fabricius, 1801

Type species
- Chrysomela clavicornis Linnaeus, 1758

Synonyms
- Aegithomimus Mader, 1942

= Aegithus =

Genus of beetle

Aegithus is a neotropical genus of pleasing fungus beetles (family Erotylidae) in subfamily Erotylinae.

== Description and systematics ==
These beetles are rather large by their family's standards (about 7-17.5 mm long, 5-15.5 mm wide), and have a rounded "hump-backed" shape as adults; overall, they resemble a large plump species of ladybeetle. Their 11-segmented antennae form a "club" at the tips which consists of distinct segments. The head is stretched out and blunt-snouted, with compound eyes composed of small ommatidia. The prothorax is not strongly curved, with sharp-angled forward edges and a conspicuously indented front margin to fit the prominent head. The last segment of the maxillary palps is wider than long, the maxillary lacinia bear two small teeth, and the mouth-cavity sides are flattened lobes. On the legs' tarsi, the first three segments are increasingly widened.

While many Aegithus species have the yellowish-and-black coloration often seen in pleasing fungus beetles, some show, more unusually for this subfamily, bright red colors. Among their subfamily, they seem to be a rather ancient lineage retaining many ancestral traits, such as a general lack of complicated color patterns (zigzag bands or eyespots) and larvae which feed singly on polypore fungi.

=== Species ===
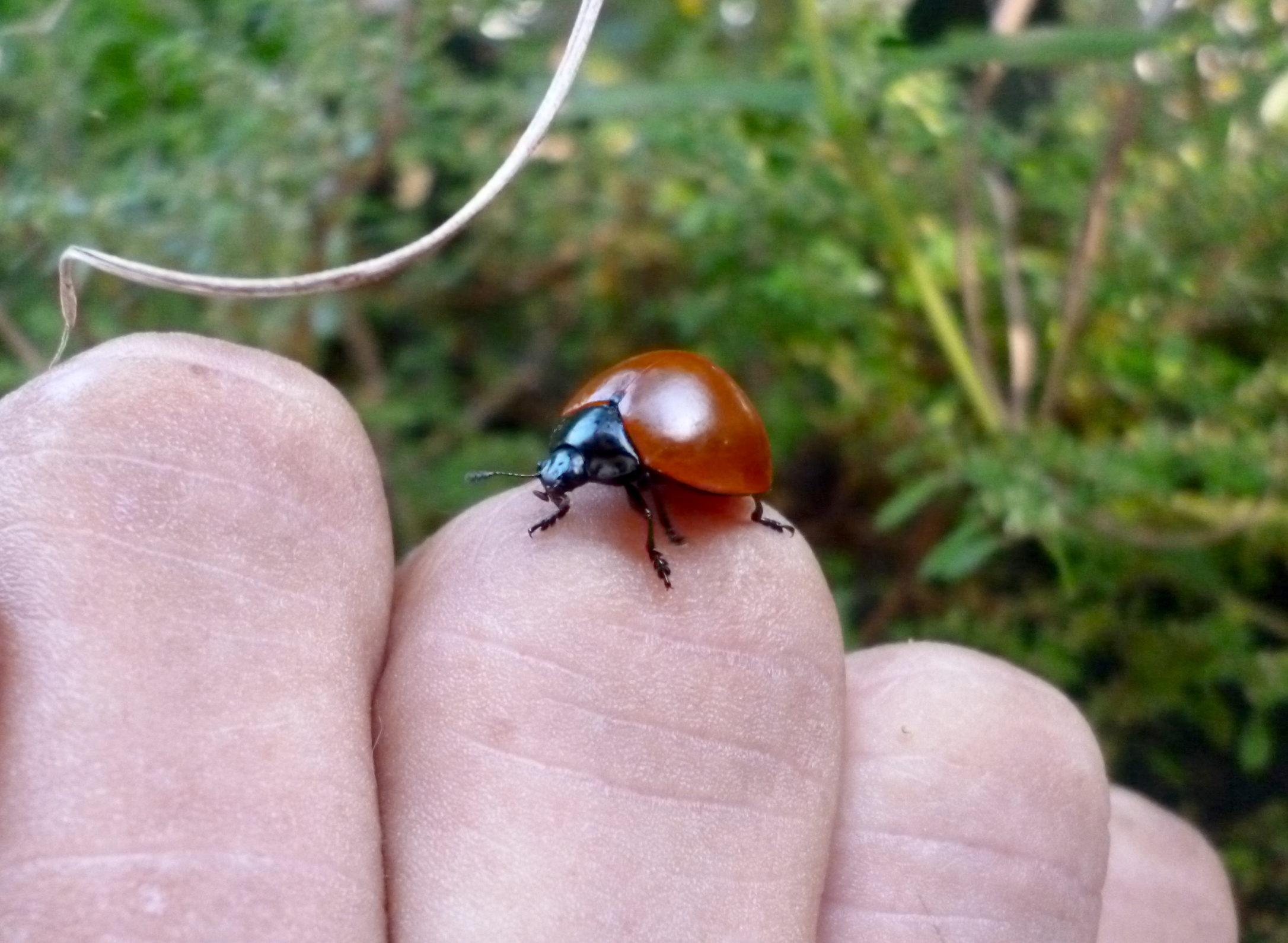
Aegithus clavicornis from Valencia, Venezuela

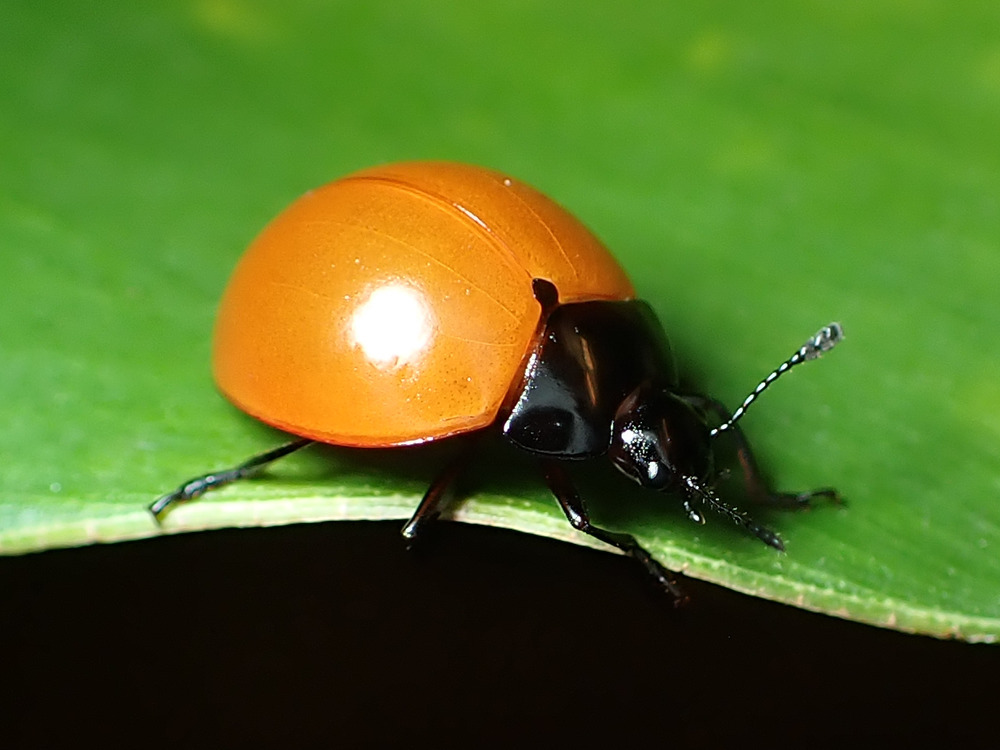
Aegithus rufipennis from Cordillera Nombre de Dios, Atlántida Department, Honduras

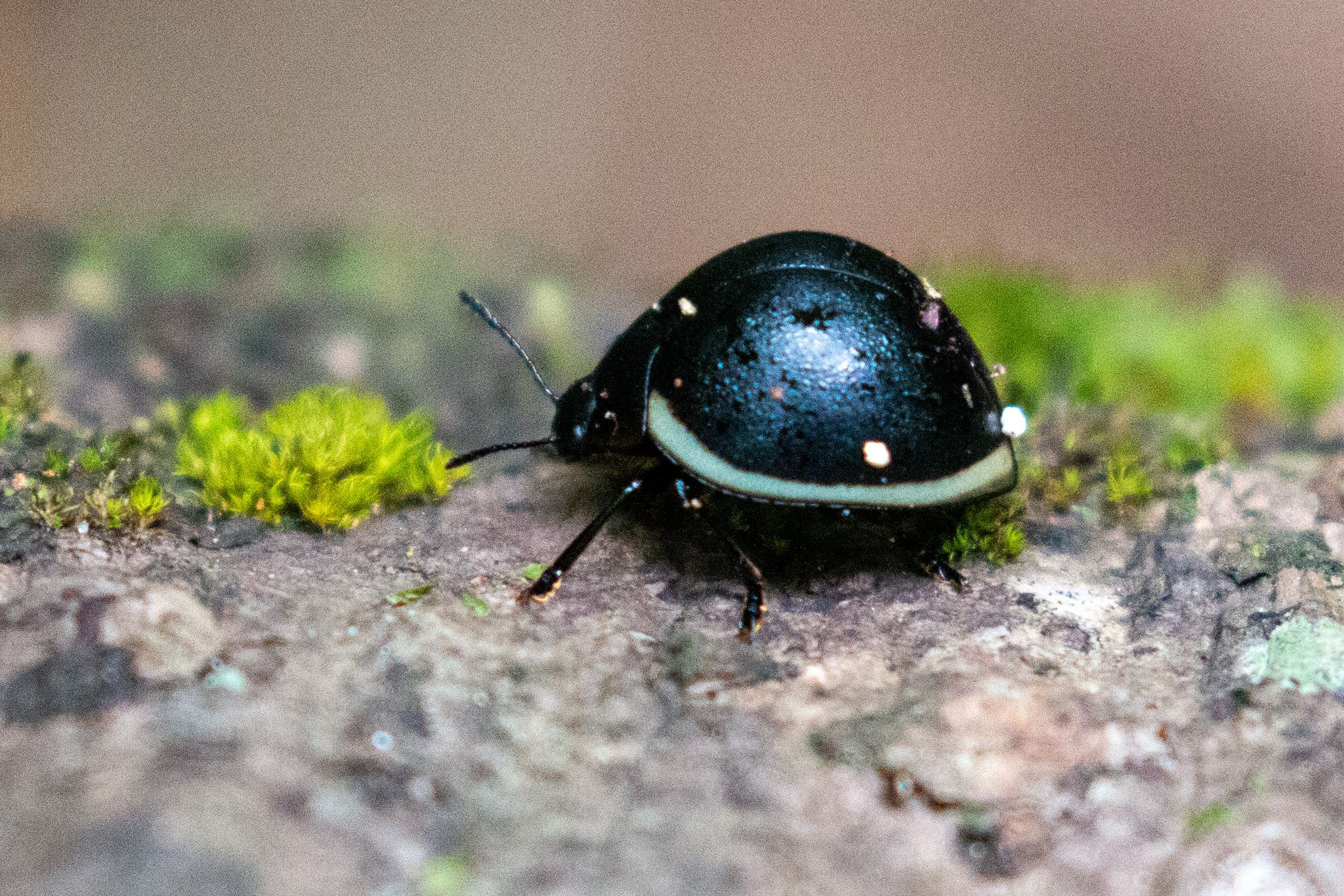
Aegithus walkenaeri from Santa Rita, Paraíba, Brazil

Aegithus contains some 75 described species:

- Aegithus abruptus Casey, 1916
- Aegithus andreae Lacordaire, 1842
- Aegithus armitagei Gorham, 1889
- Aegithus assimilis Crotch, 1876
- Aegithus bartletti Gorham, 1889
- Aegithus bicolor Kirsch, 1865
- Aegithus binarius Casey, 1916
- Aegithus bourcieri Guérin-Méneville, 1855
- Aegithus brunnipennis Lacordaire, 1842
- Aegithus bulla Lacordaire, 1842
- Aegithus burmeisteri Lacordaire, 1842
- Aegithus cardinalis Chevrolat, 1834
- Aegithus chalybeus (Duponchel, 1825)
- Aegithus cinctipennis (Duponchel, 1825)
- Aegithus circumfusus Kuhnt, 1908
- Aegithus clathraticollis Mader, 1942
- Aegithus clavicornis (Linnaeus, 1758)
- Aegithus consularis Guérin-Méneville, 1855
- Aegithus cordatus Crotch, 1876
- Aegithus cretaceus Guérin, 1956
- Aegithus cribrosus Lacordaire, 1842
- Aegithus cyanipennis Guérin-Méneville, 1841
- Aegithus decoloratus Kuhnt, 1910
- Aegithus dichrous Crotch, 1876
- Aegithus dohrni Mader, 1942
- Aegithus dubius Gorham, 1888
- Aegithus duplicatus Gorham, 1888
- Aegithus ecuadorianus Mader, 1942
- Aegithus flavolineatus Mader, 1943
- Aegithus geminatus Lacordaire, 1842
- Aegithus globulus Achard, 1926
- Aegithus gorhami Alvarenga, 1977
- Aegithus grammicus Gorham, 1888
- Aegithus hemisphaericus Lacordaire, 1842
- Aegithus hogei Gorham, 1888
- Aegithus inflatus Crotch, 1876
- Aegithus jansoni Crotch, 1873
- Aegithus lateritius Lacordaire, 1842
- Aegithus leachi Lacordaire, 1842
- Aegithus lebasi Lacordaire, 1842
- Aegithus lineatus Guérin-Méneville, 1844
- Aegithus lineola Lacordaire, 1842
- Aegithus luridus Kuhnt, 1908
- Aegithus luteus Erichson, 1847
- Aegithus maculicollis (Duponchel, 1825)
- Aegithus melaspis Gorham, 1888
- Aegithus meridionalis Crotch, 1873
- Aegithus mesosternalis Kuhnt, 1908
- Aegithus monochrous Lacordaire, 1842
- Aegithus multistriatus Mader, 1942
- Aegithus nigrocinctus Erichson, 1847
- Aegithus olivaceipennis Mader, 1942
- Aegithus ornaticollis Lacordaire, 1842
- Aegithus pallidus Kuhnt, 1908
- Aegithus politissimus Crotch, 1876
- Aegithus politus Gorham, 1888
- Aegithus punctatissimus (Fabricius, 1775) (= A.separandus)
- Aegithus quadrimaculatus Gistel, 1848
- Aegithus quadrinotatus Chevrolat, 1834
- Aegithus rhombifer Casey, 1916
- Aegithus rubriventris Kuhnt, 1908
- Aegithus rufipennis Chevrolat, 1834
- Aegithus sanguinans Dohrn, 1880
- Aegithus satellitius Lacordaire, 1842
- Aegithus schenklingi Mader, 1942
- Aegithus scurra Lacordaire, 1842
- Aegithus stillatus Gorham, 1888
- Aegithus striatellus Crotch, 1876
- Aegithus strigicollis Gorham, 1888
- Aegithus suturella Lacordaire, 1842
- Aegithus torquatus Lacordaire, 1842
- Aegithus trilineatus Kuhnt, 1908
- Aegithus truncatus Crotch, 1876
- Aegithus uva Lacordaire, 1842
- Aegithus varicollis Lacordaire, 1842
- Aegithus walkenaeri Lacordaire, 1842

A review of the UPN collection found 7 identifiable species represented among the 41 Aegithus specimens, with records from across the southeastern half of Colombia but none northwest of Boyacá and Valle del Cauca departments. Apart from the common A.clavicornis, all of the species seemed to be spottily distributed. And in addition, 4 specimens (about 10%) from Cundinamarca and Tolima departments in central Colombia could only be assigned to Aegithus, but not to a species known from the region.
