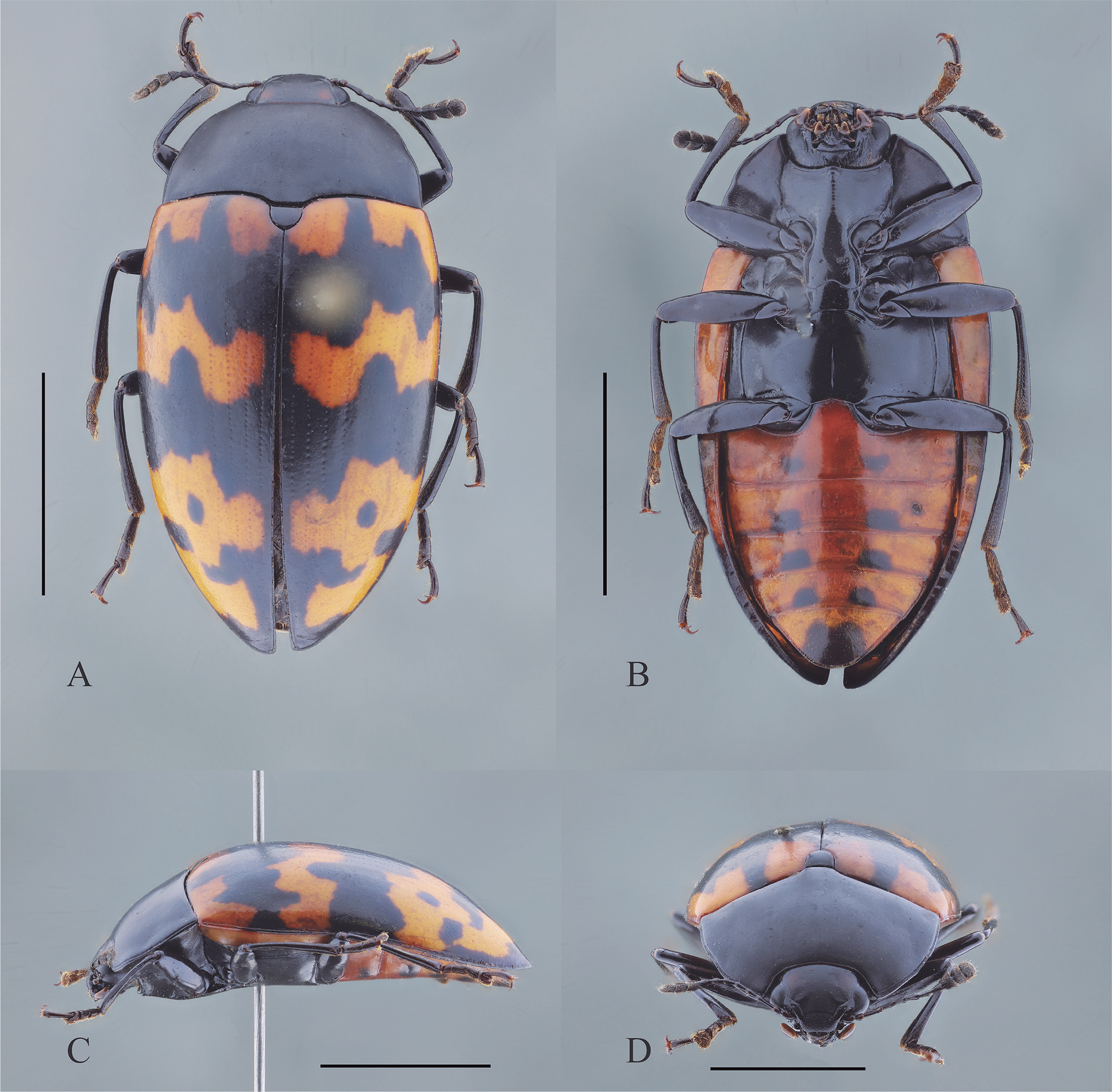

Scientific classification
- Kingdom: Animalia
- Phylum: Arthropoda
- Clade: Pancrustacea
- Class: Insecta
- Order: Coleoptera
- Suborder: Polyphaga
- Infraorder: Cucujiformia
- Family: Erotylidae
- Genus: Iphiclus
- Species: I. abdominalis

Binomial name
- Iphiclus abdominalis (Fabricius, 1792)

Synonyms
- Erotylus abdominalis Fabricius, 1792; Erotylus abdominalis Olivier, 1792; Brachysphoenus abdominalis; Saccomorphus abdominalis

= Iphiclus abdominalis =

Species of beetle

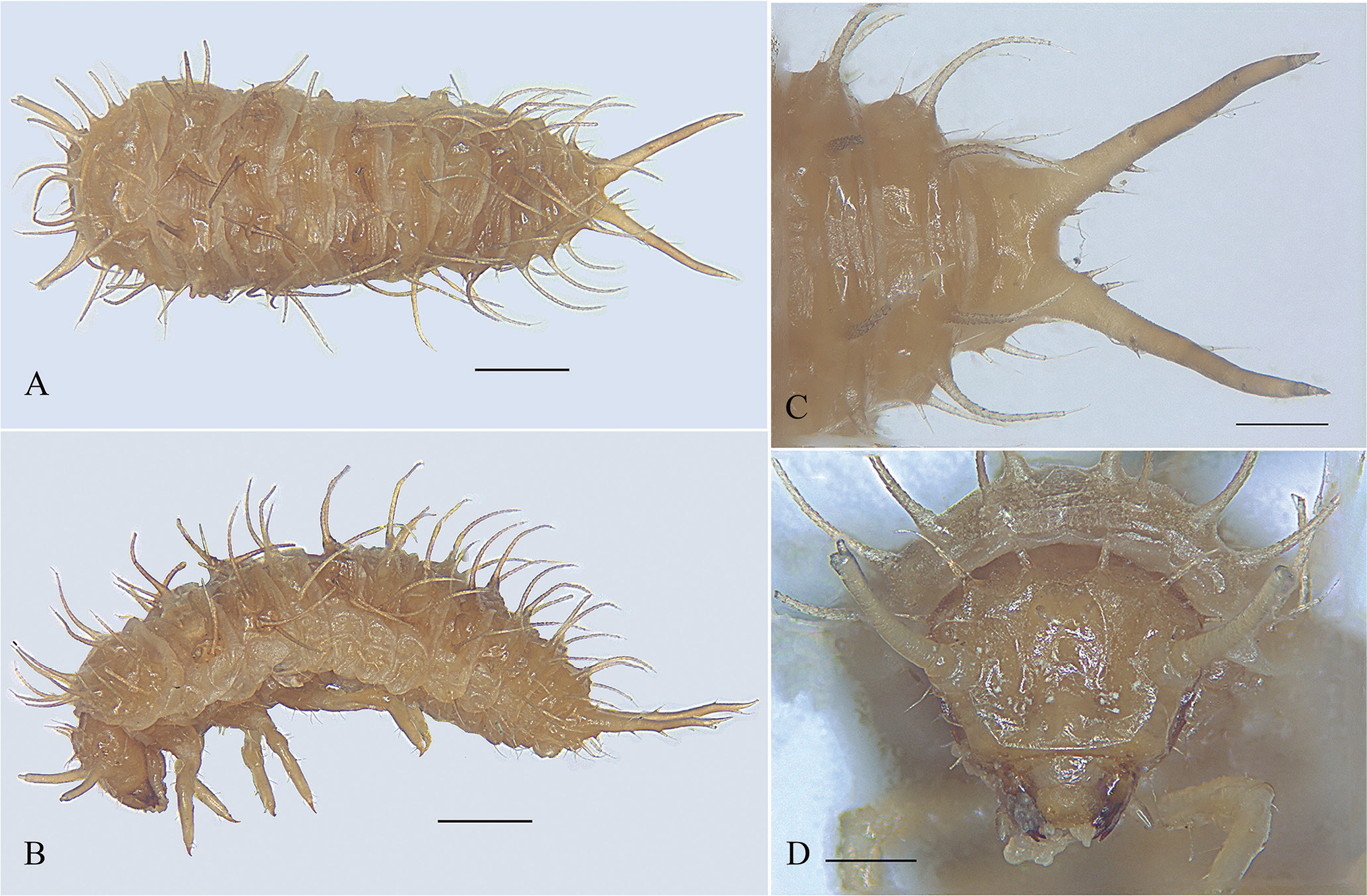
Iphiclus abdominalis larva

Iphiclus abdominalis is a species of beetle of the Erotylidae family. This species is found in Brazil (Minas Gerais, Espírito Santo, Rio de Janeiro, São Paulo, Paraná, Santa Catarina, Rio Grande do Sul, Goiás) and Argentina (Misiones, Tucuman).

Adults reach a length of 8-12.6 mm. They have a black body and yellow elytra with three black transverse and sinuous bands.
