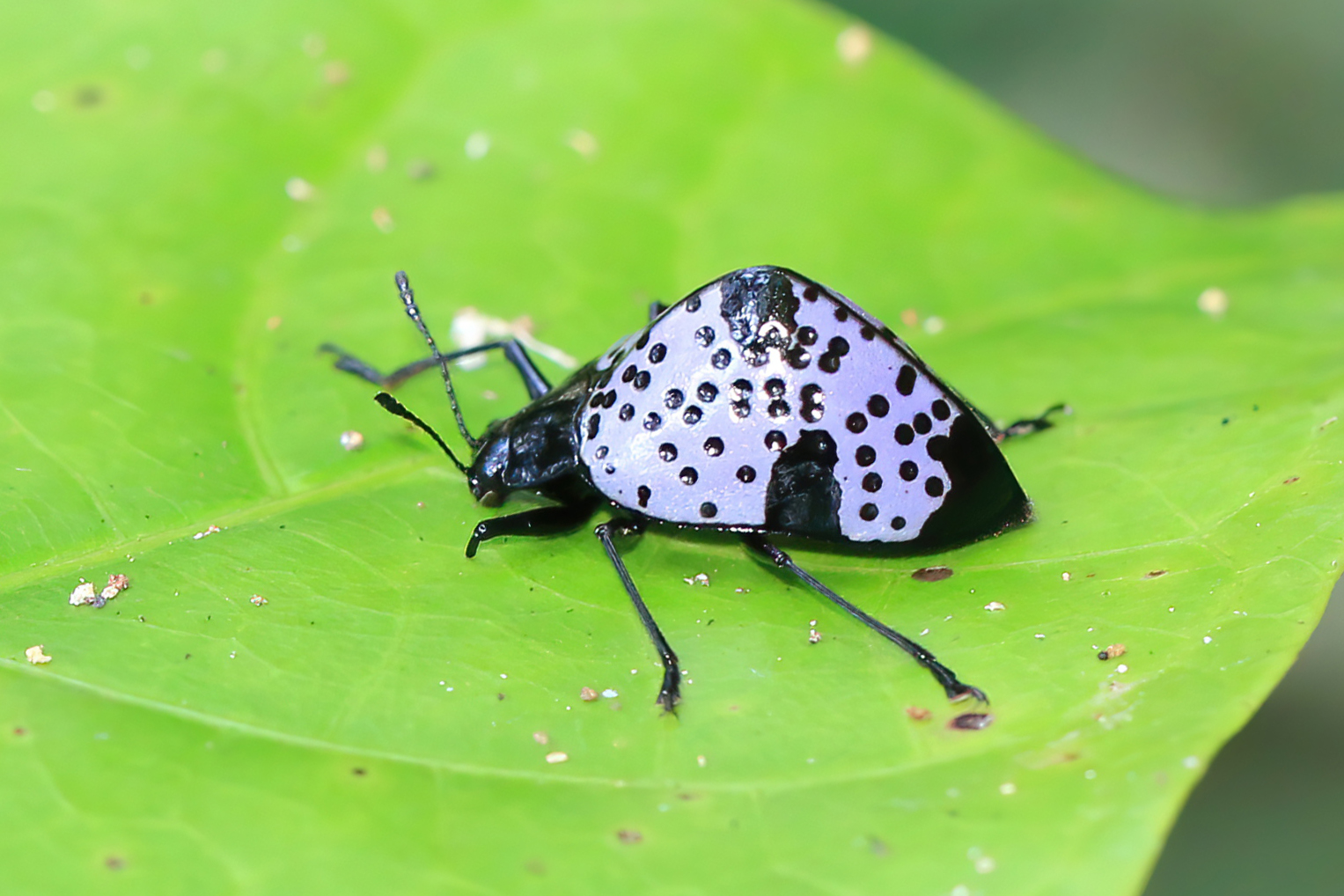
- Cypherotylus debauvei at the Cristalino River, Brazil

Scientific classification
- Kingdom: Animalia
- Phylum: Arthropoda
- Clade: Pancrustacea
- Class: Insecta
- Order: Coleoptera
- Suborder: Polyphaga
- Infraorder: Cucujiformia
- Family: Erotylidae
- Tribe: Erotylini
- Genus: Cypherotylus; Crotch, 1873

Type species
- Chrysomela gibbosa Linnaeus, 1763

Synonyms
- Gibbifer Voet, 1806 (unavailable); Hypselonotus Hope, 1841 (non Hahn, 1833: preoccupied)

= Cypherotylus =

Genus of beetles

Cypherotylus is an American genus of pleasing fungus beetles (family Erotylidae), belonging to subfamily Erotylinae. This genus frequently appears in the older literature under the name "Gibbifer", but this name is permanently unavailable under ICZN Article 11.4, as are all of Johann Eusebius Voet's names due to his inconsistent use of binomial nomenclature.

The elytra of these large (by Erotylidae standards – up to an inch/over 20 mm) beetles are usually light brownish-grey with a black pattern. While the beetles are alive, their elytra also have structural coloration – metallic iridescence or a light blue bloom –, but this fades away in dead specimens. The elytra are also often elevated into a hump or spike – hence the obsolete genus name "Gibbifer" (Latin for "hump-bearer" or "hunchback"), as well as several species names alluding to humped mammals such as camels.

This genus is moderately diverse by standards of its family, containing a few dozen species. They occur mostly along the eastern rim of the Andes, and into the Neotropical lowlands, as well as throughout most of Central America. One species, C.californicus, ranges into the USA, where it is known as "blue fungus beetle".

== Description ==
Cypherotylus beetles are large by their family's standards, around 13-25 mm (0.5-1 in) long and 7-14 mm wide as adults. They have a plump elongated body, with large but not outsized antennae and legs. The elytra form more or less pronounced humps when the wings are closed, and in some species even pointed spikes

Except for the elytra, Cypherotylus are generally black, with red markings on the pronotum in some species. Unusual for Erotylidae, the elytra of living Cypherotylus have an outer layer that gives them structural coloration – a metallic iridescence or pearlescent sheen in some species, while others have a light blue bloom. This coloration disappears rather quickly after the beetle is dead – even under good storage conditions, it does not last more than a handful of years – and the basic color of the elytra shows, which is a dingy ochre-gray. Also, the elytra have prominent black markings which vary between species; most often they are impressed points, but some have larger blotches or stripes in addition or instead.

At a casual glance, Cypherotylus are indistinguishable from the genus Cuphotes of the darkling beetle family Tenebrionidae, which, beyond belonging to the same infraorder Cucujiformia, is not closely related to the pleasing fungus beetles. The easiest way to tell them apart is by checking the segments of the hindleg tarsi ("feet") for the presence of a tiny 4th segment at the base of the claw-bearing segment 5; this is found in Cypherotylus but not in Cuphotes, whose feet end with a claw-bearing 4th segment. Other differences are unreliable or require a microscope to assess. These two genera are so visually similar that W. Wayne Boyle, one of the leading 20th-century Erotylidae researchers, "rush[ed] to his collection [to] determine the tarsal formula of all his Cypherotylus specimens immediately after having seen his first Cuphotes!".

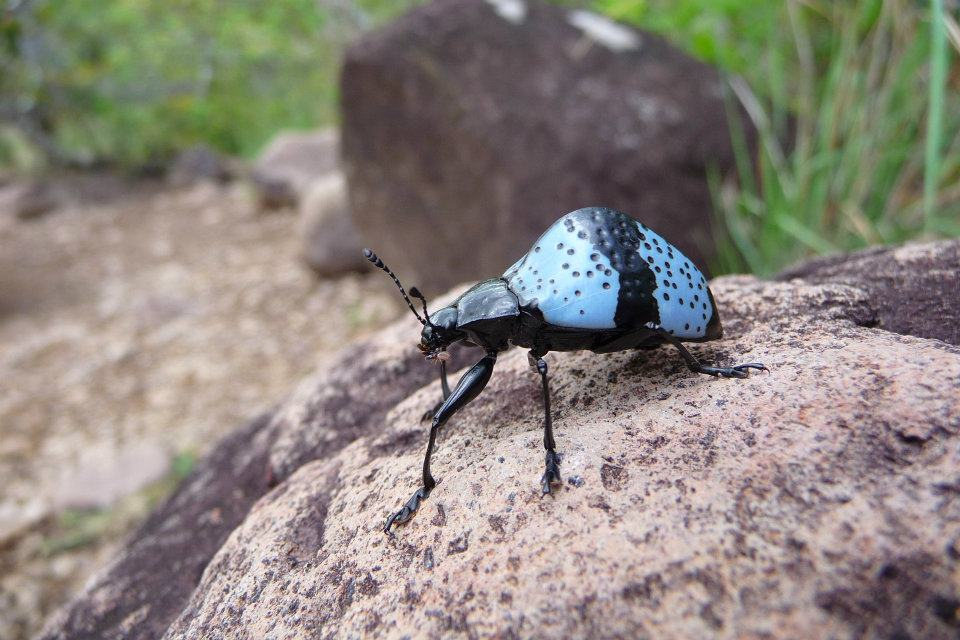
Unidentified Cypherotylus (probably C.gibbosus) in Rincón de la Vieja National Park, Costa Rica

Head
The compound eyes of these beetles have small ommatidia, which in beetles usually indicates diurnal habits. Their 11-segmented antennae have a "club" at the tip in which the segments are still distinctly visible. Above the antenna sockets, the sides of the head are indented; the snout is square-shaped and narrowed at the base, with the epistomo-frontal suture running on the "forehead" well-developed and continuous between the antennae sockets. The lacinia of the maxilla has two stout teeth at the tip. The maxillary and labial palps are curved and end with a triangular or oval segment which is wider than long; the first segment of the maxillary palps is notably shorter than segment 2 and 3 together, as is typical for subfamily Erotylinae (or tribe Erotylini, if Erotylinae are defined sensu lato). The labial mentum is neither conspicuously large nor small, and forms a triangle with roughly equal height and base-length, and the mouth-cavity sides are flattened lobes.

Body, wings and legs
The prothorax is rather small, wider than long, but even so comparatively narrow – at its rear end, barely more than half as wide as the elytra at their widest point. The pronotum is entirely surrounded by a thin margin (unlike in the close relatives Erotylina and Erotylus where the rear is unmargined), and has a slightly bumpy surface (usually but not always much more so than in the relative Prepopharus). The elytra, unlike those of most other pleasing fungus beetles, do not have lengthwise stripes composed of punctuations; instead, they feature very large impressed dots in a rather irregular (and often species-specific) pattern. Male Cypherotylus can be recognized by a rough and hairy spot in the center of the first abdomen abdominal segment. The tibiae of the legs are of normal shape, without and conspicuous expansions of the tip. The tarsi appear four-segmented, due to the fourth segment being massively reduced in size; it attaches to the central upper tip of the third tarsal segment and is rigidly joined to the 5th (last) tarsal segment. The first three segments of the tarsi are increasingly widened.

== Taxonomy, distribution and ecology ==
Some 35 species are placed in this genus today. Cypherotylus belongs to subfamily Erotylinae, or – in taxonomic arrangements that prefer a more comprehensive Erotylinae – in tribe Erotylini of the Erotylinae. Historically, members of related genera (such as Erotylus latreillei or E.olivieri) were also often placed in Cypherotylus. The beetle now known as Cypherotylus duponcheli is a particularly extreme example: initially, Johann Voet's pre-Linnean name "Gibbifer tigrinus" was applied to it in error (Voet's "G.tigrinus" is actually C.gibbosus), and subsequently it was for more than 100 years considered the same species as the darkling beetle Cuphotes sphacelatus, and the names "Cypherotylus sphacelatus" and "Erotylus sphacelatus" were indiscriminately applied to either. Only in 1937 was this mix-up resolved. But Frederick Hope in 1841 had already established a new pleasing fungus beetle genus Hypselonotus, using "Erotylus sphacelatus" as his type species. Unfortunately, he overlooked the earlier use of Hypselonotus by Carl Hahn for a genus of leaf-footed bugs, and Hope's name was thus a junior homonym and unusable. This problem was rather quickly rectified by merging Hope's genus into Cypherotylus.

Cypherotylus has a mainly Neotropical distribution, as is typical for its subfamily (or tribe). But unlike most of their relatives, members of this genus are slightly better adapted to cooler subtropical climates. Thus, they are less diverse in the extremely hot and humid lowlands of the Amazon Basin, but occur mostly in the lower ranges of the eastern Andes south to northern Argentina, as well as in Central America where they are mainly found on the Gulf of Mexico side of the American Cordillera. A considerable number of species is found in Mexico, with one even reaching the southwestern USA.

Despite being widespread and diverse, few details of these beetles' lifestyle are known. C.californicus, however, is comparatively well-studied for a pleasing fungus beetle, and there is nothing to suggest that the lesser-known Cypherotylus species drastically differ in their ecology. Like most pleasing fungus beetles, they are woodland animals, and are usually found in association with fungi on which adults and larvae feed. However, unlike most Erotylidae, which are specialized and often monophagous fungivores, Cypherotylus adults also apppear to eat decaying wood. But wood remains found in C.californicus intestines were also heavily riddled with mycelium, and it might be this, not the wood itself, which the beetle was foraging for.

The similarity between Cypherotylus and Cuphotes is suggestive of some form of mimicry. While there is some evidence to suggest that certain Erotylidae are avoided by predators, it is not clear whether this is true for Cypherotylus; neither is it certain that Cuphodes are not unpalatable. Thus, whether the similarity to Cuphotes is a case of Batesian or of Müllerian mimicry (or in fact no mimicry at all, but just chance convergence) remains to be resolved. What can be said with certainty is that Cypherotylus are conspicuous, slow-moving, and only in a few cases have obvious defences, but unlike many other pleasing fungus beetles they lack the ubiquitous aposematic pattern of black-and-red/yellow coloration crosswise stripes.

== Species ==
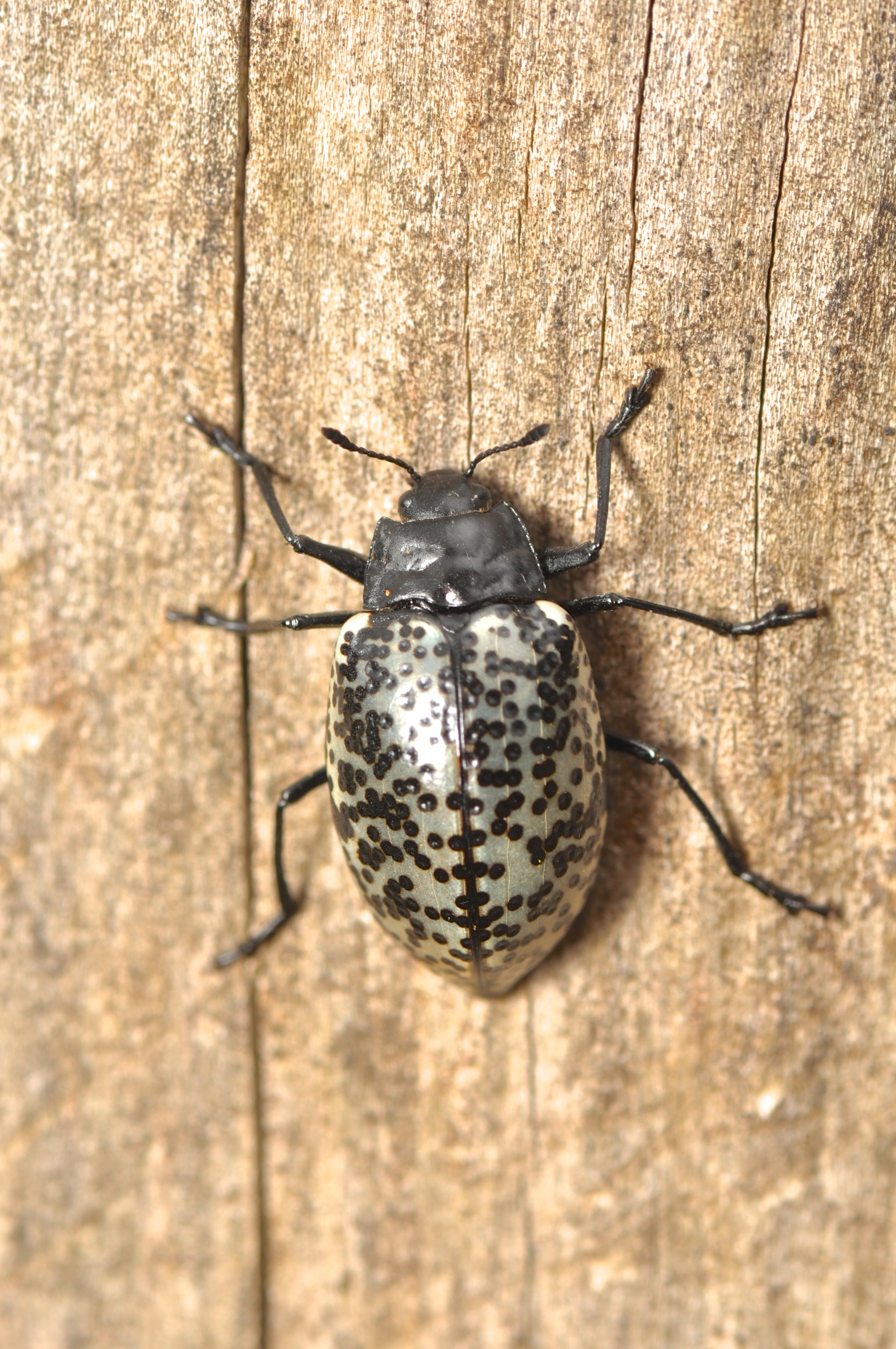
Cypherotylus boisduvali in Cuernavaca, Mexico

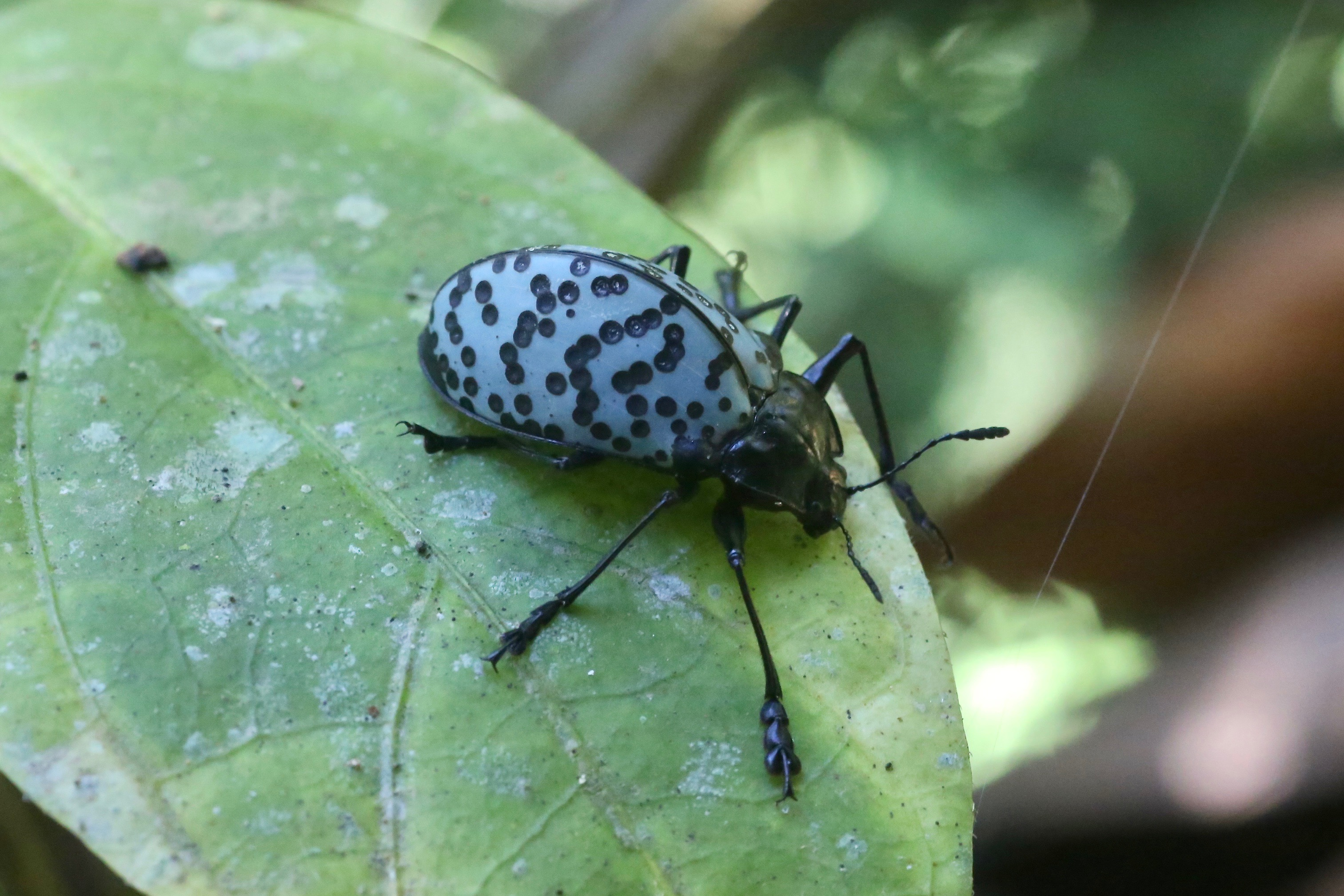
Cypherotylus impressopunctatus or a closely related species near Mindo, Ecuador

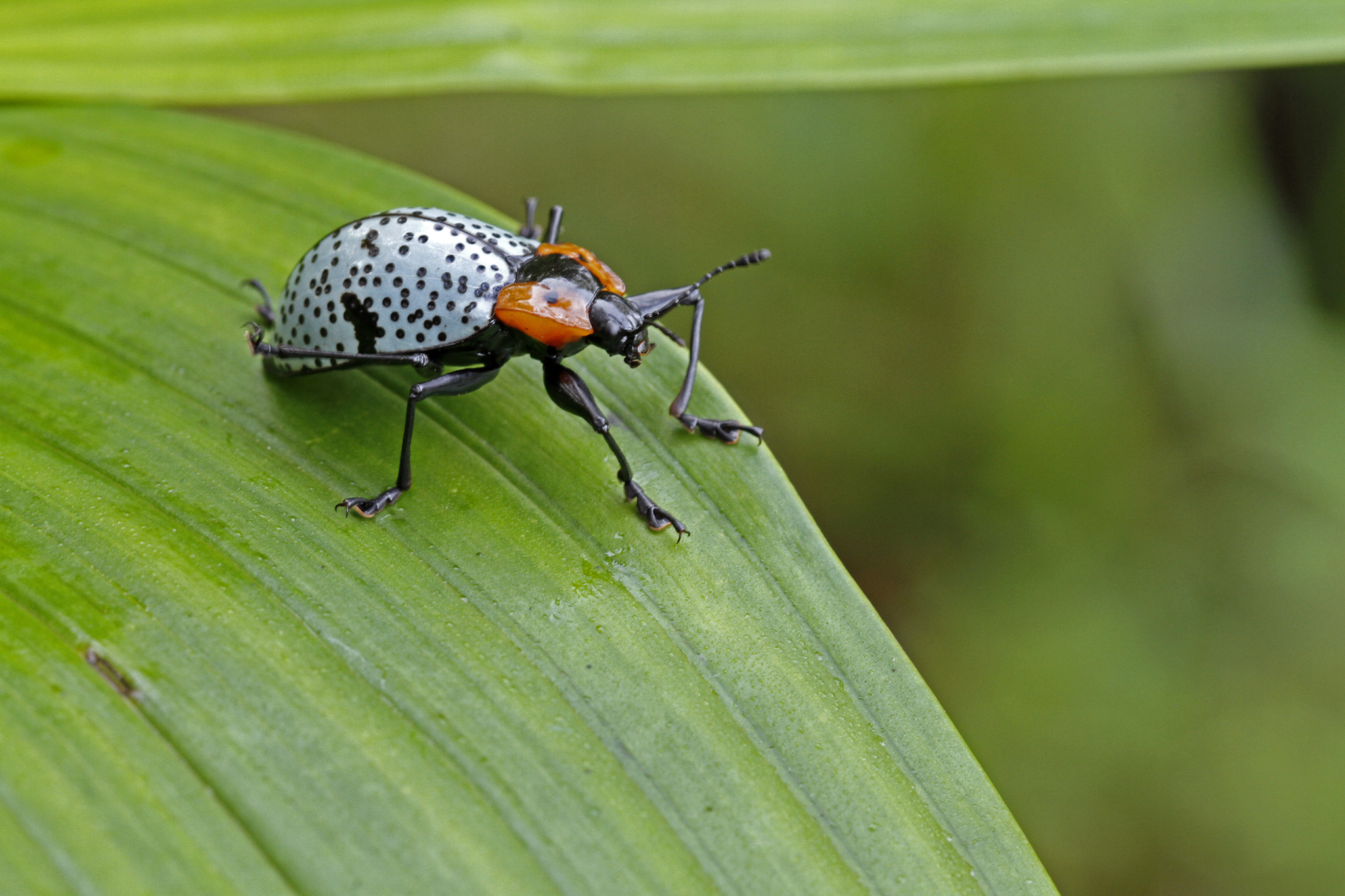
Cypherotylus vicinus in Sarapiquí canton, Costa Rica

There are about 45 described species in Cypherotylus:

- Cypherotylus adrianae (Alvarenga, 1976) (= C.apiatus (Lacordaire, 1842), non Chevrolat, 1835: preoccupied, C.apicatus (lapsus))
- Cypherotylus aeneoniger Crotch, 1876
- Cypherotylus alutaceus Gorham, 1888
- Cypherotylus annulipes (Guérin-Méneville, 1841)
- Cypherotylus anthracinus Gorham, 1888
- Cypherotylus apicalis Crotch, 1876
- Cypherotylus armillatus (Erichson, 1847)
- Cypherotylus ater (Kirsch, 1876)
- Cypherotylus badeni Dohrn, 1883
- Cypherotylus banghaasi Mader, 1935
- Cypherotylus boisduvali (Chevrolat, 1834)
- Cypherotylus bolivianus Mader, 1942
- Cypherotylus borgmeieri (Alvarenga, 1976) (= C.annulatus (Lacordaire, 1842), nec Germar, 1824: preoccupied)
- Cypherotylus californicus – blue fungus beetle (= C.aspersus)
- Cypherotylus camelus (Guérin-Méneville, 1841)
- Cypherotylus costaricensis Gorham, 1888
- Cypherotylus debauvei (De Mey, 1838)
- Cypherotylus dromedarius (Lacordaire, 1842)
- Cypherotylus duponcheli Arrow, 1937 (= C.sphacelatus auct. non Fabricius, 1801: preoccupied, C.tigrinus (Voet, 1778): unavailable)
- Cypherotylus elevatus (Fabricius, 1801)
- Cypherotylus fenestratus Gorham, 1888
- Cypherotylus gaumeri Gorham, 1888
- Cypherotylus gibbosus (Linnaeus, 1763)
- Cypherotylus goryi (Guérin-Méneville, 1841)
- Cypherotylus gracilis Kuhnt, 1908
- Cypherotylus guatemalae Crotch, 1876
- Cypherotylus hopfneri Mader, 1935
- Cypherotylus impressopunctatus Crotch, 1873
- Cypherotylus impunctatus Crotch, 1876
- Cypherotylus intercedens Kuhnt, 1908
- Cypherotylus irroratus Kuhnt, 1908
- Cypherotylus jacquieri (Lacordaire, 1842)
- Cypherotylus maximus Crotch, 1876
- Cypherotylus miliaris (Lacordaire, 1842)
- Cypherotylus obstinatus Mader, 1942
- Cypherotylus ovalis Mader, 1942
- Cypherotylus patellatus Gorham, 1888
- Cypherotylus seriatus Kuhnt, 1908
- Cypherotylus sticticus (Erichson, 1847)
- Cypherotylus stillatus (Kirsch, 1865)
- Cypherotylus tectiformis (Kuhnt, 1910)
- Cypherotylus triangularis Guérin, 1949
- Cypherotylus variolosus Crotch, 1876
- Cypherotylus vicinus (Guérin-Méneville, 1841) (= C.jansoni, C.melanostigma)
- Cypherotylus zebu (Kirsch, 1876)

A review of the UPN collection found 6 identifiable species represented among the 25 Cypherotylus specimens, with most records from central Colombia where especially C.debauvei is not rare. But 9 specimens (more than one-third of the total) from Tolima Department could only be assigned to Cypherotylus, not to a species known from the region. How many species (if more than a single but common one) are represented is not yet known.
