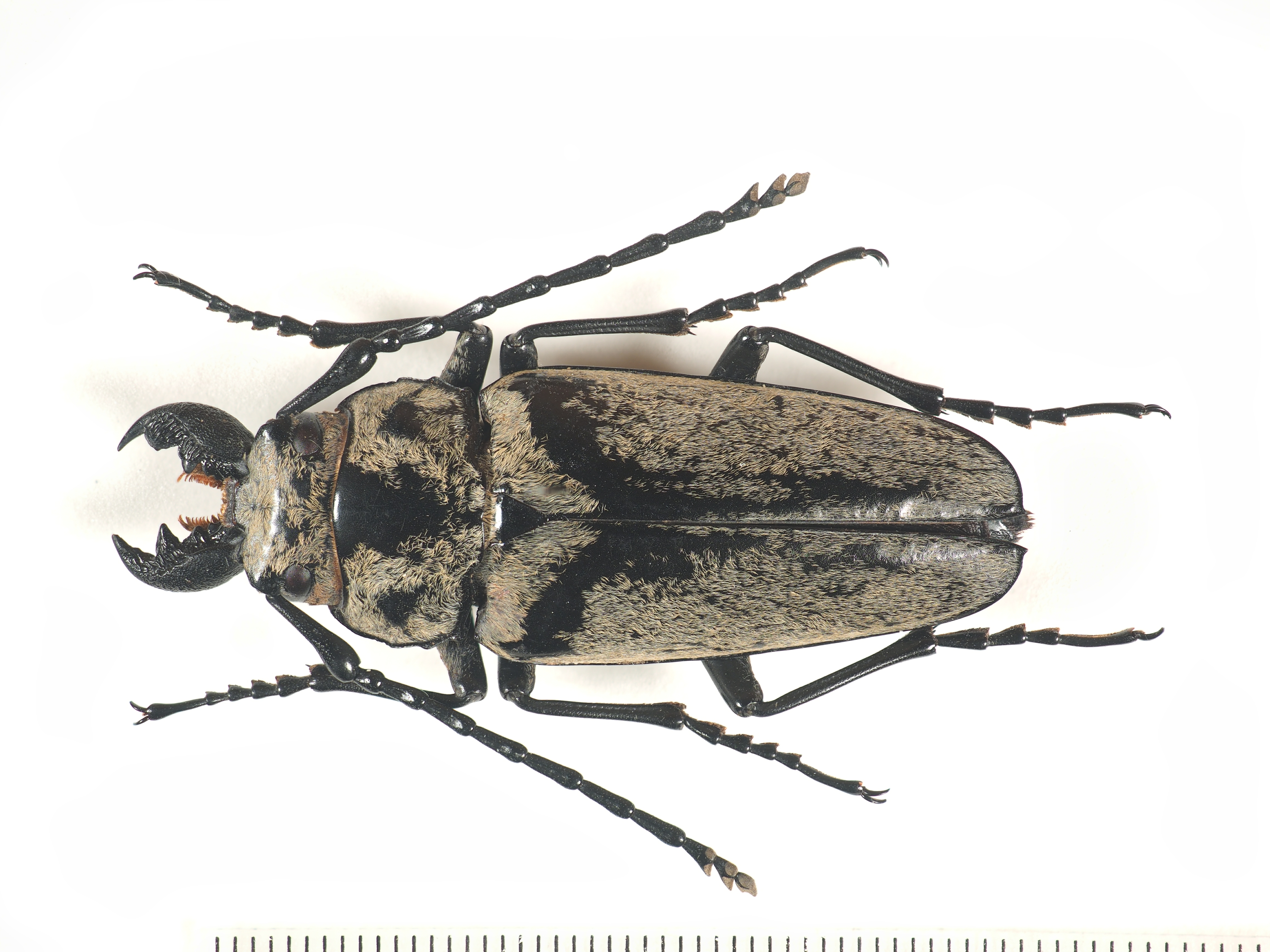
- Trictenotoma davidi (formerly T. formosana)

Scientific classification
- Kingdom: Animalia
- Phylum: Arthropoda
- Clade: Pancrustacea
- Class: Insecta
- Order: Coleoptera
- Suborder: Polyphaga
- Infraorder: Cucujiformia
- Family: Trictenotomidae
- Genus: Trictenotoma; Gray, 1832

= Trictenotoma =

Genus of beetles

Trictenotoma is a genus of beetle in the Trictenotomidae family. They have scales covering the elytra that fluoresce under ultraviolet light. Based on similarities in the larval characteristics, the family is thought to be closely related to the Salpingidae.

== Species ==
- Trictenotoma childreni Gray, 1832
- Trictenotoma cindarella Kriesche, 1921
- Trictenotoma davidi Deyrolle, 1875 (syn. Trictenotoma formosana Kriesche, 1919)
- Trictenotoma grayi Smith, 1851
- Trictenotoma lansbergi Dohrn, 1882
- Trictenotoma mniszechi Deyrolle, 1875
- Trictenotoma mouhoti Deyrolle, 1875
- Trictenotoma pollocki Telnov & Drumont, 2020
- Trictenotoma templetoni Westwood, 1848
- Trictenotoma westwoodi Deyrolle, 1875
