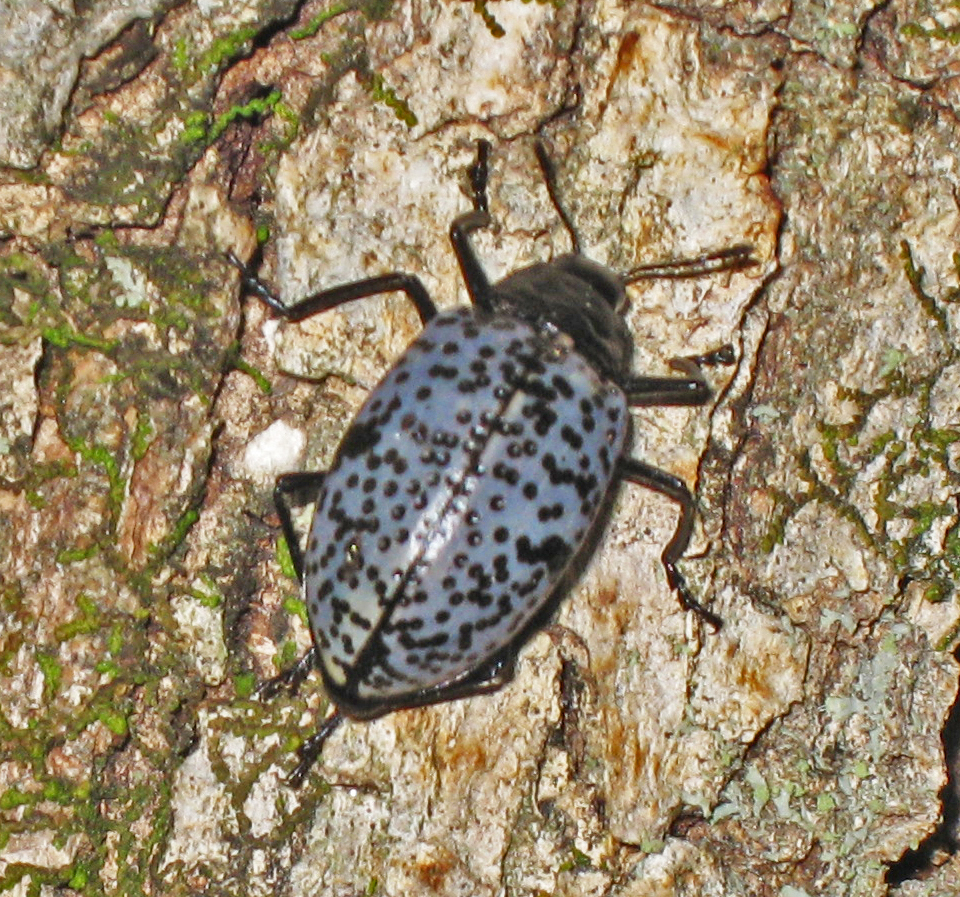
- near Portal Arizona
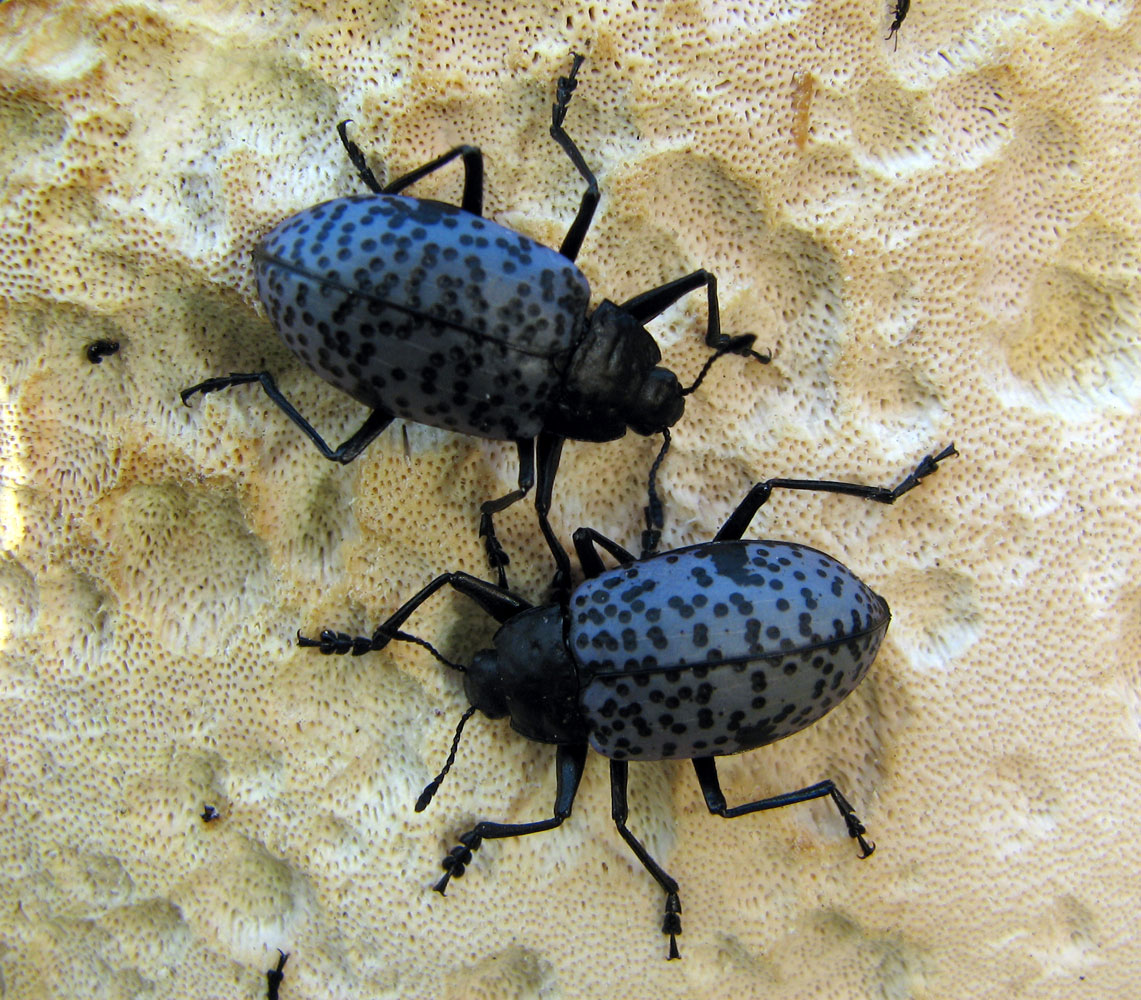

Scientific classification
- Kingdom: Animalia
- Phylum: Arthropoda
- Clade: Pancrustacea
- Class: Insecta
- Order: Coleoptera
- Suborder: Polyphaga
- Infraorder: Cucujiformia
- Family: Erotylidae
- Genus: Cypherotylus
- Species: C. californicus

Binomial name
- Cypherotylus californicus (Lacordaire, 1842)

Synonyms
- Cypherotylus aspersus Crotch, 1873; Cypherotylus aspersus var. californicus (Lacordaire, 1842); Cypherotylus asperus (lapsus); Cypherotylus boisduvali californicus (Lacordaire, 1842); Cypherotylus boisduvali var. californicus (Lacordaire, 1842); Erotylus californicus Lacordaire, 1842; Gibbifer californicus (Lacordaire, 1842)

= Cypherotylus californicus =

Species of beetle

Cypherotylus californicus, known commonly as the blue fungus beetle or blue pleasing fungus beetle, is a species of pleasing fungus beetle in the family Erotylidae. It is recorded from Wyoming, Colorado, New Mexico, Arizona, California, Kansas in the United States, and the Mexican state of Sonora. The elytra are blue with black dots, with the blue turning gray as they age. The adult beetles typically are about 1.4–1.8 cm (0.6–0.7 in) long.

== Biology ==
The beetle starts its life in the spring when it hatches from an egg, and pupates in the summer. It mates and lays eggs in the late summer and early fall. It feeds on fungi that it finds growing on logs and trees.

== Gallery ==
video of feeding on fungus

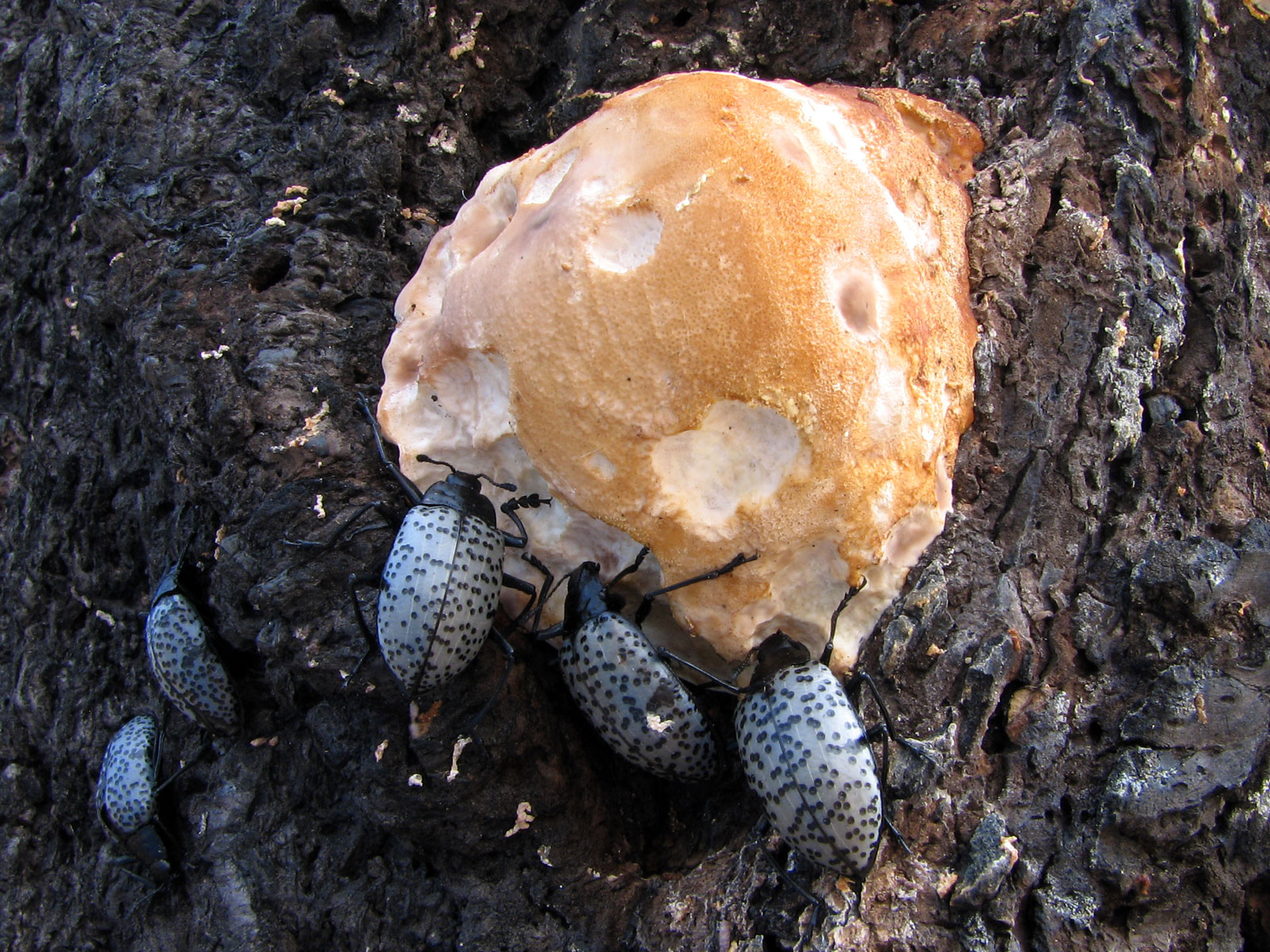
Cypherotylus californicus feeding on fungus

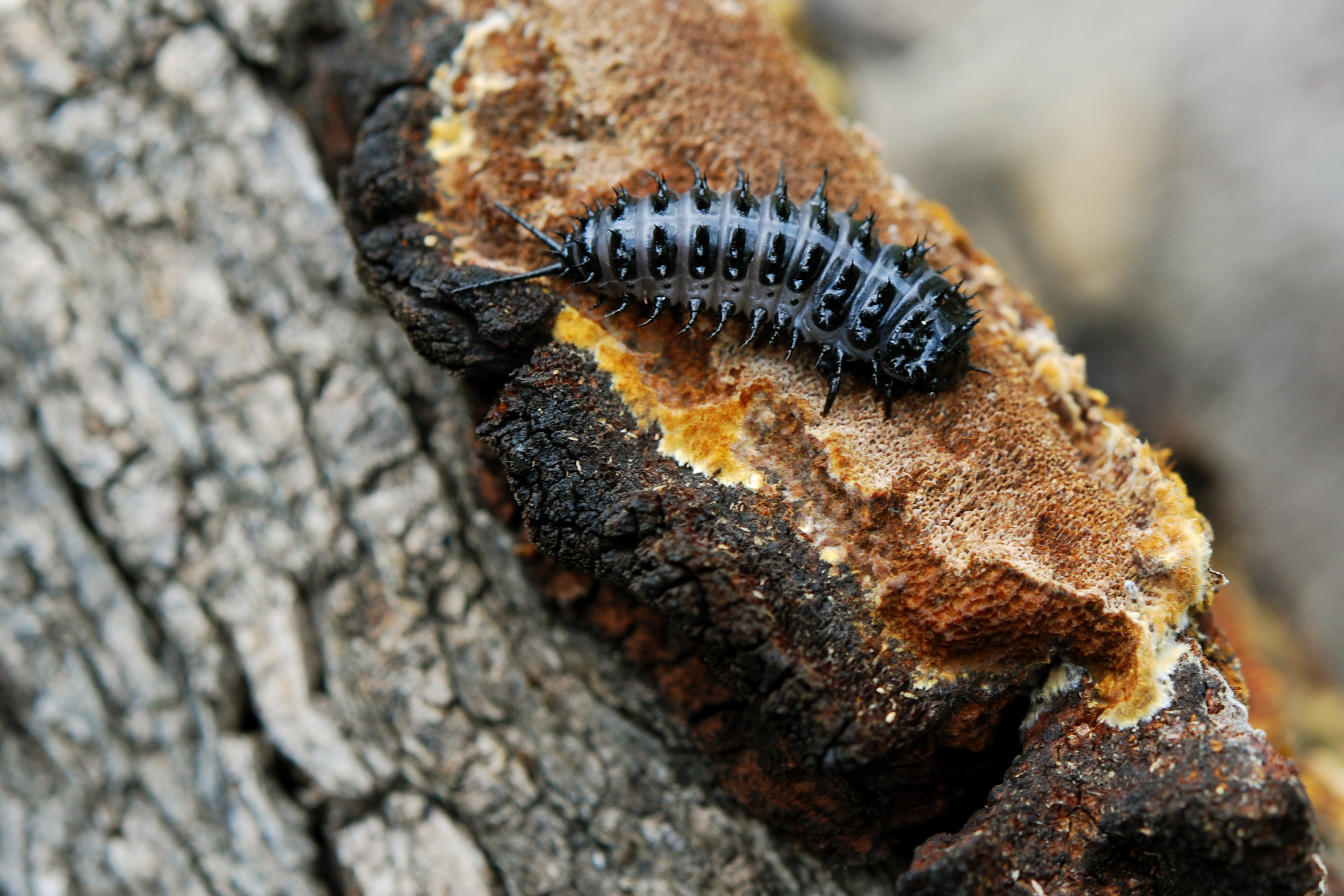
larva of Cypherotylus californicus
