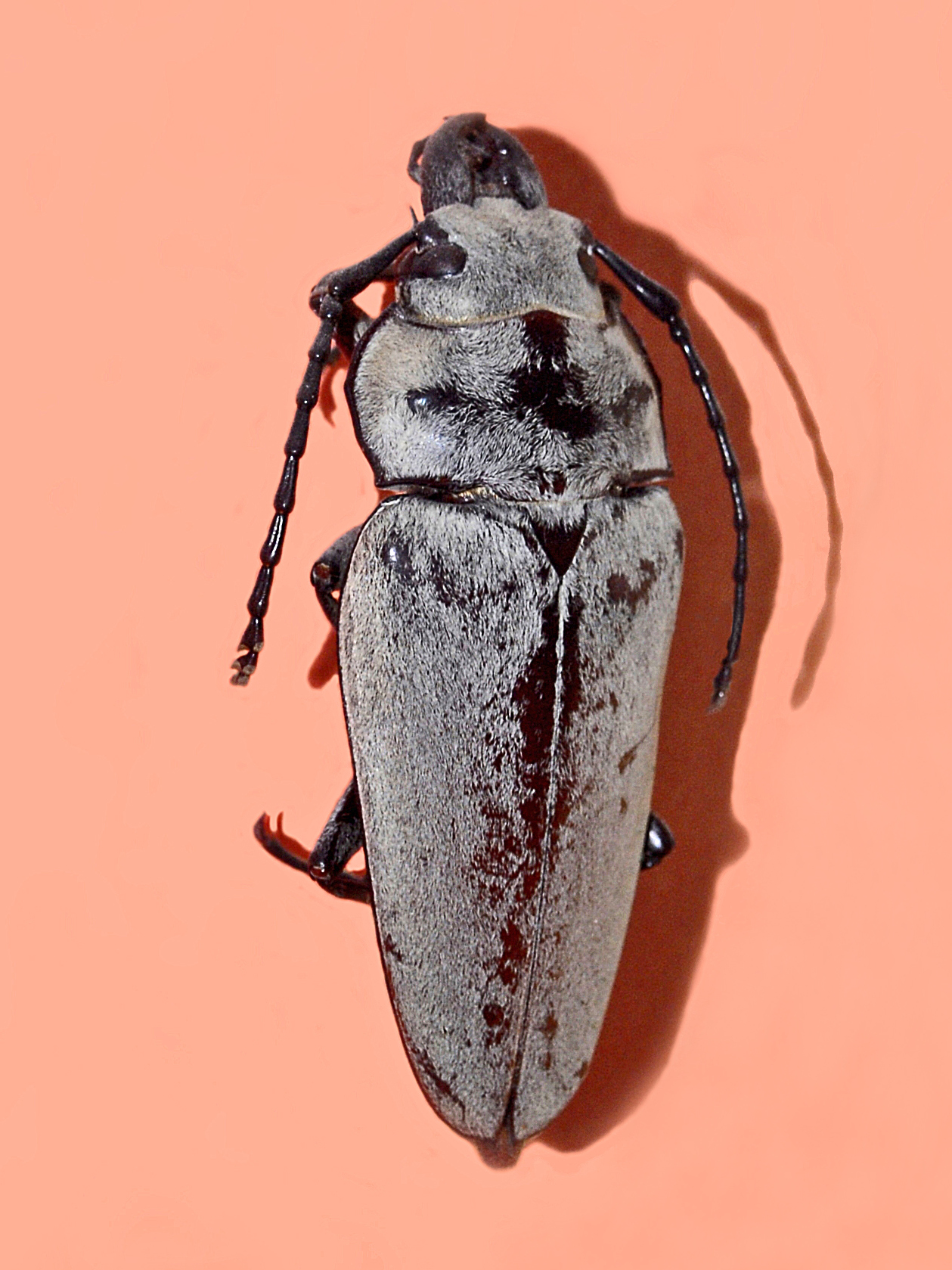
- Museum specimen of Trictenotoma childreni

Scientific classification
- Kingdom: Animalia
- Phylum: Arthropoda
- Class: Insecta
- Order: Coleoptera
- Suborder: Polyphaga
- Infraorder: Cucujiformia
- Family: Trictenotomidae
- Genus: Trictenotoma
- Species: T. childreni

Binomial name
- Trictenotoma childreni Gray, 1832

Synonyms
- Trictenotoma birmana Dohrn, 1882; Trictenotoma doriae Deyrolle, 1875; Trictenotoma thomsoni Deyrolle, 1875

= Trictenotoma childreni =

Species of beetle

Trictenotoma childreni, the log-boring beetle or brown steampunk beetle, is a species of beetle in the Trictenotomidae family. It can reach a body length of about 55–65 mm (2.2–2.6 in). Basic color of these large beetles is black, the body is slightly flattened. The elytra and the body are covered with thick grayish-yellow hair that fluoresce under ultraviolet light. It has large eyes, long antennae and legs, and powerful mandibles. This species can be found in Malaysia, Myanmar, Borneo, Thailand, Indonesia, Vietnam, China, and India in damp and seasonal forests.
