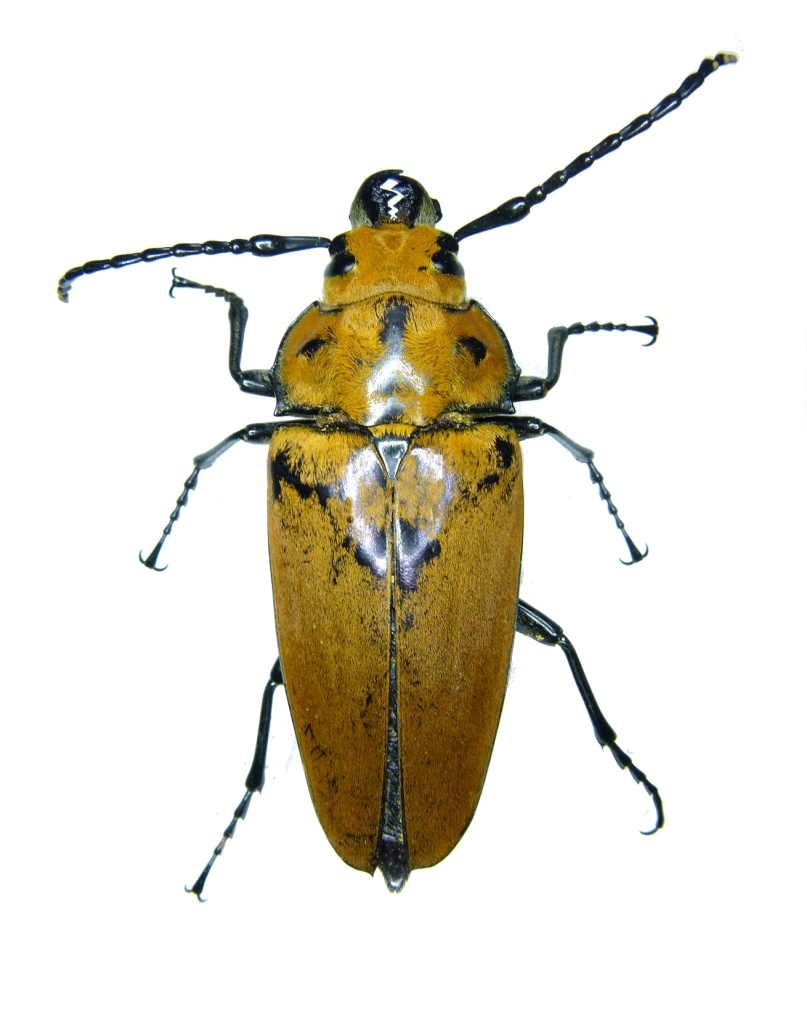
- Specimen from the Western Ghats, Mudigere

Scientific classification
- Domain: Eukaryota
- Kingdom: Animalia
- Phylum: Arthropoda
- Class: Insecta
- Order: Coleoptera
- Suborder: Polyphaga
- Infraorder: Cucujiformia
- Family: Trictenotomidae
- Genus: Trictenotoma
- Species: T. grayi

Binomial name
- Trictenotoma grayi Smith, 1851

= Trictenotoma grayi =

Species of beetle

Trictenotoma grayi is a species of beetle and the only representative of the family Trictenotomidae from southern India where it is found. They can be easily mistaken for Cerambycid beetles but the antennae arising from a notch in front of the eye give away the family.

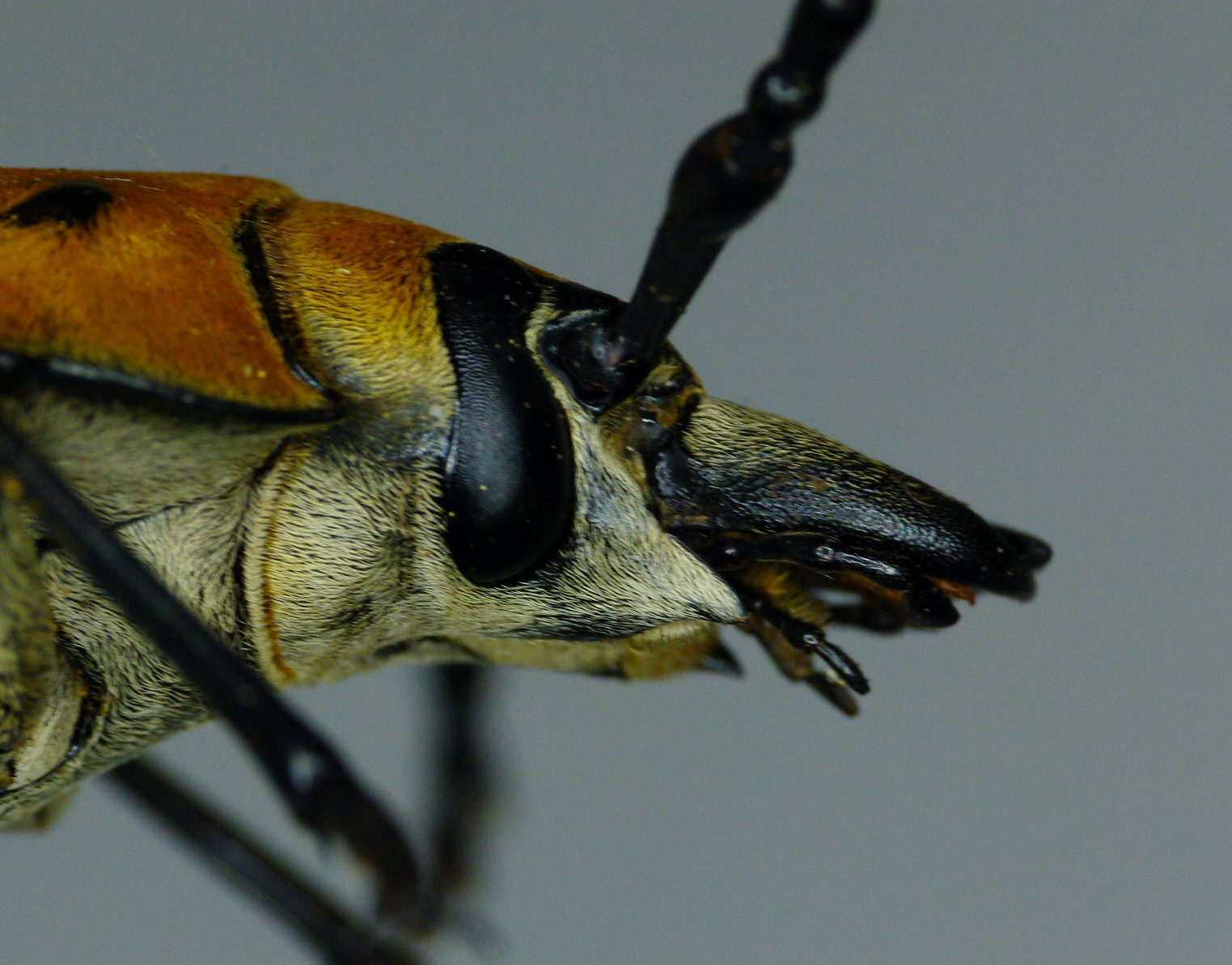
The eye and antennal base

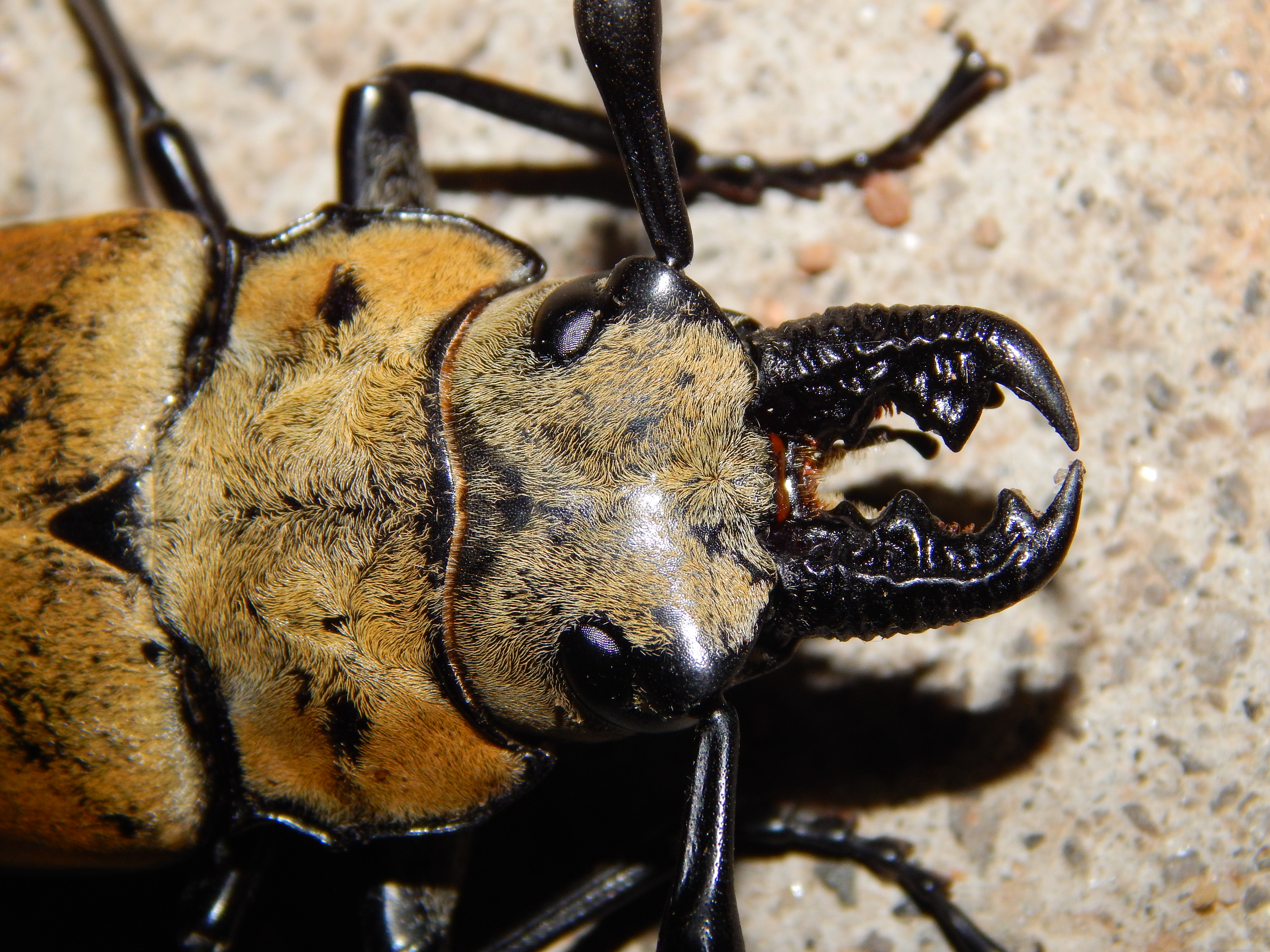
Trictenotoma grayi

The head and thorax are black and covered by fine ochre coloured hairs. The thorax has two raised spots that lack the hairs. The body underneath is clothed in whitish hairs. The mandibles point forward and the tips cross at rest while the teeth interlock.

The species was described and named on the basis of a specimen first collected by Samuel Neville Ward from the North Kanara region of Karnataka, India. The species is found along the Western Ghats.
