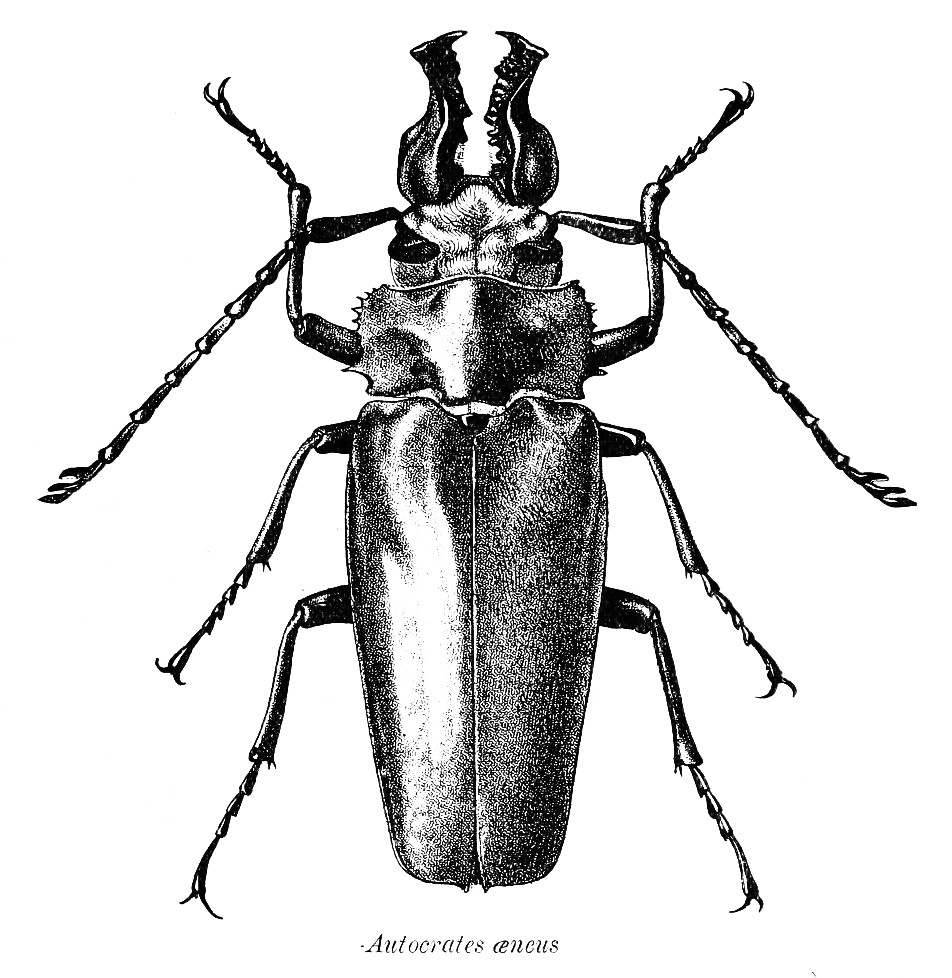
- Autocrates aeneus (male)

Scientific classification
- Kingdom: Animalia
- Phylum: Arthropoda
- Clade: Pancrustacea
- Class: Insecta
- Order: Coleoptera
- Suborder: Polyphaga
- Infraorder: Cucujiformia
- Superfamily: Tenebrionoidea
- Family: Trictenotomidae
- Genus: Autocrates; Thomson, 1860

= Autocrates (beetle) =

Genus of beetles

Autocrates is a genus of beetles in the Trictenotomidae family with species across the Indomalayan realm. They are sexually dimorphic with males having longer and more sinuate mandibles.

== Species ==
Six species have been described:

- Autocrates aeneus (Westwood 1846) - Himalayas from India to China
- Autocrates ivanovi Drumont, 2016 - Vietnam
- Autocrates lini sp. nov., 2022 - China
- Autocrates maqueti Drumont, 2006 - China, Korea
- Autocrates oberthueri Vuillet, 1910 - Tibet, China
- Autocrates vitalisi Vuillet, 1912 - Vietnam, Cambodia, China (Guangdong, Guangxi, Hainan, Sichuan, Xizang (Tibet), Yunnan), Laos, Thailand, Malaysia, Myanmar, Singapore.
- Autocrates soni Cho et Kim, 2024 - Vietnam
