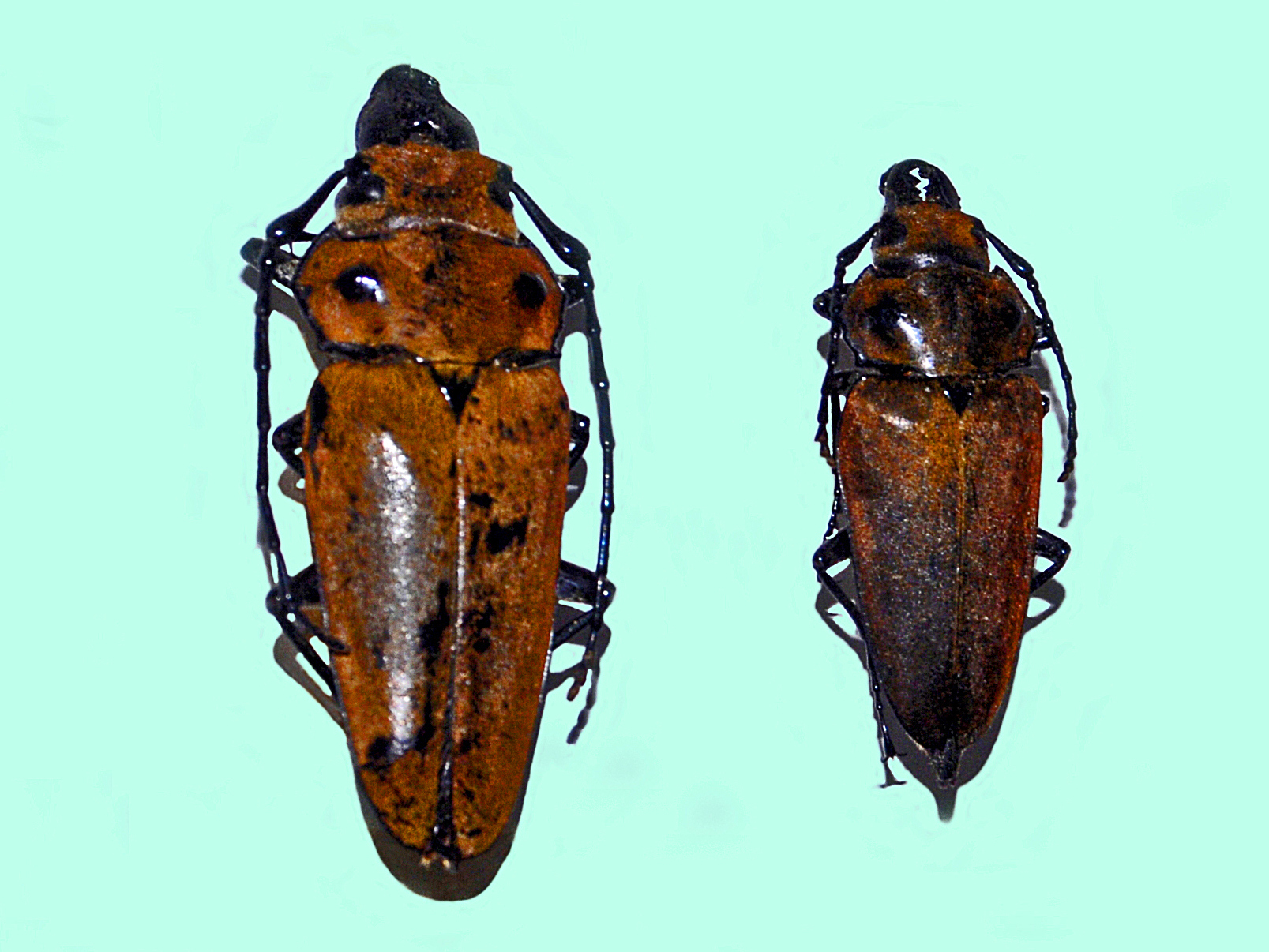
- Museum specimen of Trictenotoma lansbergei

Scientific classification
- Kingdom: Animalia
- Phylum: Arthropoda
- Class: Insecta
- Order: Coleoptera
- Suborder: Polyphaga
- Infraorder: Cucujiformia
- Family: Trictenotomidae
- Genus: Trictenotoma
- Species: T. lansbergei

Binomial name
- Trictenotoma lansbergei Dohrn, 1882

= Trictenotoma lansbergei =

Species of beetle

Trictenotoma lansbergei is a species of beetle in the Trictenotomidae family.

== Distribution ==
This species can be found in Indonesia (Nias Island).
