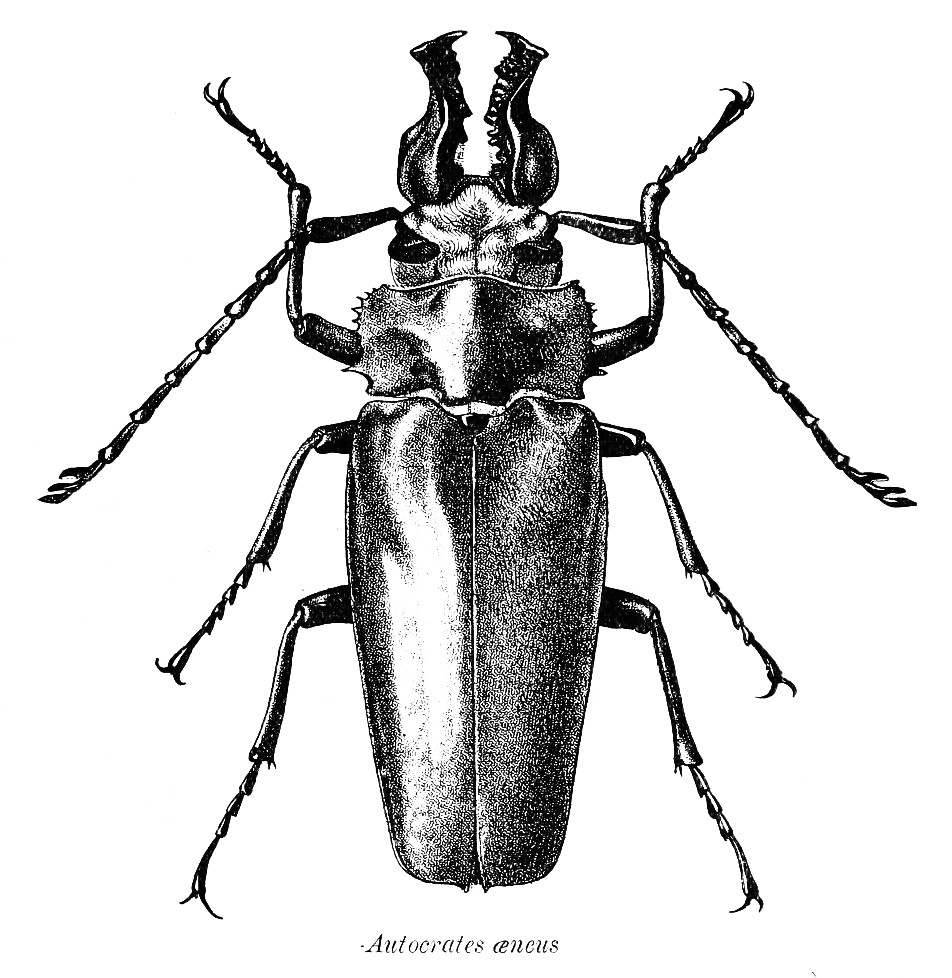
- Autocrates aeneus (male)

Scientific classification
- Kingdom: Animalia
- Phylum: Arthropoda
- Class: Insecta
- Order: Coleoptera
- Suborder: Polyphaga
- Infraorder: Cucujiformia
- Family: Trictenotomidae
- Genus: Autocrates
- Species: A. aeneus

Binomial name
- Autocrates aeneus (Westwood 1846)

= Autocrates aeneus =

Species of beetle

Autocrates aeneus is a species of Trictenotomidae found along the Himalayas from India, Nepal, Bhutan, and China. Males have larger mandibles which are sinuous.

The species, originally described as Trictenotoma aenea by Westwood in 1846 is the type for the family. A specimen was first exhibited in 1846 by a Captain Parry whose collections had been examined by Westwood and the authorship is sometimes incorrectly attributed to Parry.
