= Tarsal formula =

Insect morphology parameter

Diagram of a typical insect leg

A tarsal formula states the number of segments of an insect's tarsi as three numbers, a-b-c, starting with the fore leg (a), then the middle leg (b), then the hind leg (c). For example, a tarsal formula of "5-5-4" as found in the Trictenotomidae means there are five segments in the fore leg's tarsi, five segments in the middle leg's tarsi, and four segments in the hind leg's tarsi. This character is especially useful at family rank and higher.

While tarsal formulae are often highly diagnostic, they may not be easy to determine. For example, the pleasing fungus beetle genus Cypherotylus and the darkling beetle genus Cuphotes are most "easily" distinguished by their tarsal formula, which is 5-5-5 in the former and 5-5-4 in the latter. However, Cypherotylus – like many other pleasing fungus beetles – has cryptopentamerous ("hidden five-segmented") tarsi, with the distinctive fourth segment (which is completely absent in Cuphotes) reduced to a tiny nub that is rigidly joined to the base of the fifth segment, and requires some experience to identify.
