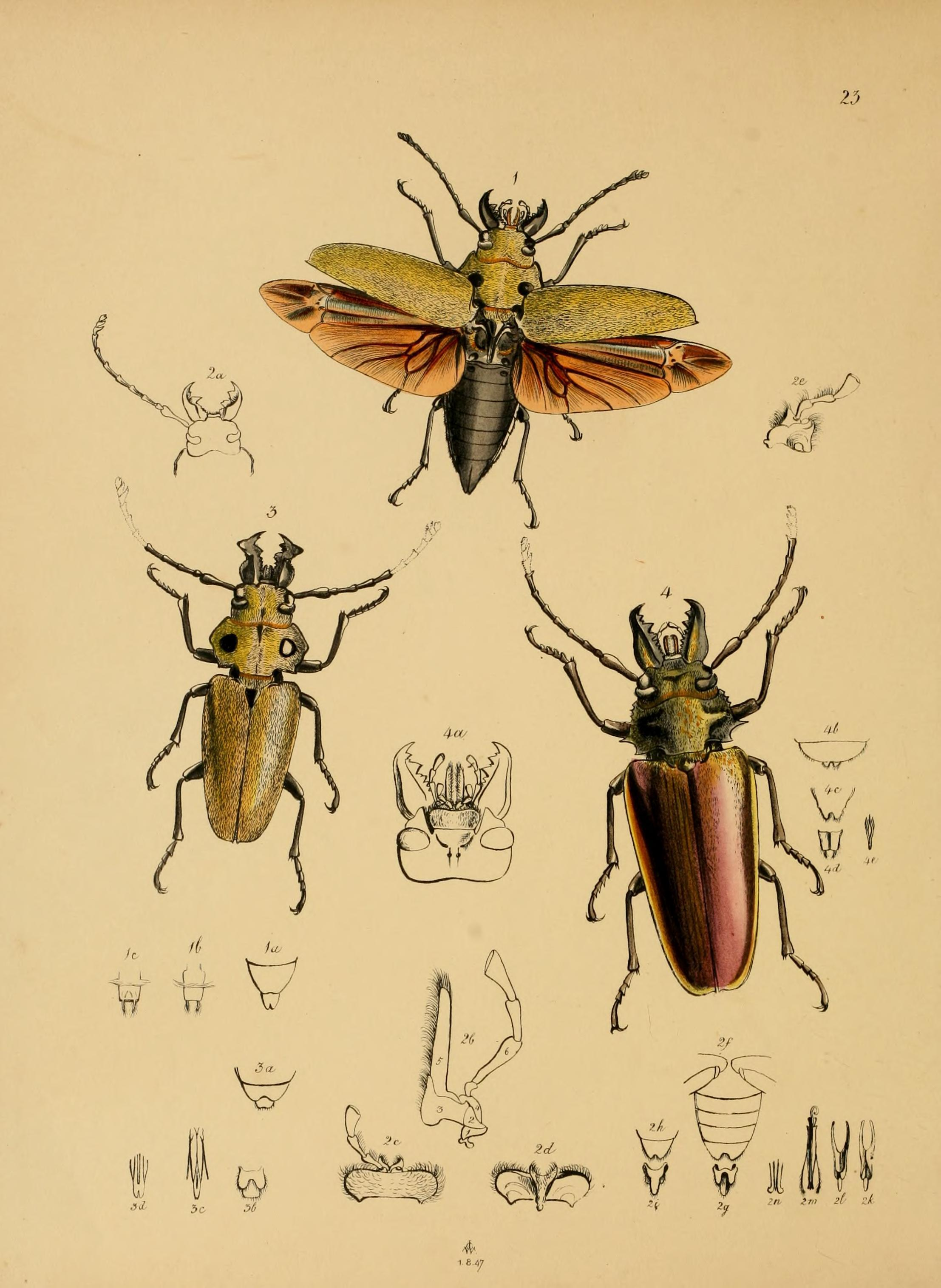
- Left side specimen

Scientific classification
- Kingdom: Animalia
- Phylum: Arthropoda
- Class: Insecta
- Order: Coleoptera
- Suborder: Polyphaga
- Infraorder: Cucujiformia
- Family: Trictenotomidae
- Genus: Trictenotoma
- Species: T. templetoni

Binomial name
- Trictenotoma templetoni Westwood, 1848

= Trictenotoma templetoni =

Species of beetle

Trictenotoma templetoni is a species of croc beetle found in Sri Lanka.
