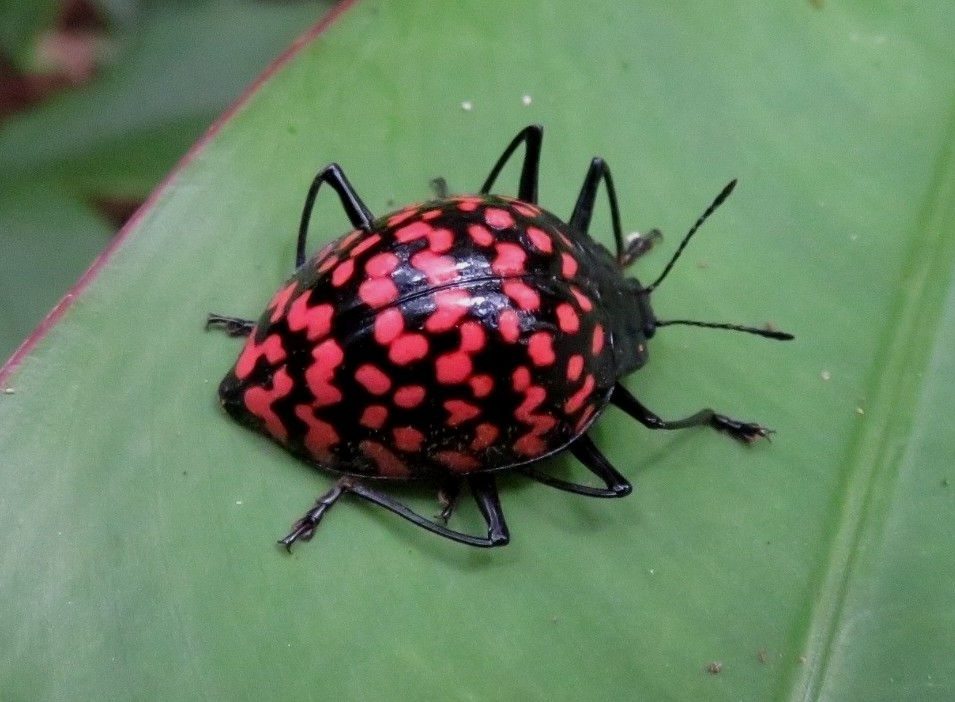
- Erotylus giganteus, the type species of Erotylus

Scientific classification
- Kingdom: Animalia
- Phylum: Arthropoda
- Clade: Pancrustacea
- Class: Insecta
- Order: Coleoptera
- Suborder: Polyphaga
- Infraorder: Cucujiformia
- Family: Erotylidae
- Genus: Erotylus; Fabricius, 1775

Type species
- Coccinella gigantea Linnaeus, 1758

Synonyms
- Pseudochrysomela Voet, 1806 (unavailable)

= Erotylus =

Genus of beetles

Erotylus is a genus in the pleasing fungus beetle family (Erotylidae). This neotropical genus belongs to the subfamily Erotylinae, of which it is the type genus.

Most of the roughly 100 species of Erotylus are found in the Amazon Basin. Some occur in the eastern Andes foothills, and a few are found in Central America north to Honduras. The occasional reports further north are probably introduced individuals.

== Description ==
Erotylus beetles are large by their family's standards, around 15-25 mm (0.6-1 in) long and 6-17 mm wide as adults. They have a plump body, with large but not outsized antennae and legs. The compound eyes have small ommatidia, and the snout is square-shaped and narrowed at the base. Their 11-segmented antennae have a "club" at the tip in which the segments are still distinctly visible. The end segments of the maxillary palps are wider than long, the maxillary lacinia bear two small teeth, and the mouth-cavity sides are flattened lobes. The thorax is large and wide, lacks a distinct margin at the base (unlike in the close relative Cypherotylus), and the surface of the pronotum is conspicously dimpled (usually but not always much more so than in the relative Prepopharus). The elytra have a blunt teardrop shape when the wings are closed, and the first three segments of the tarsi are increasingly widened. However, it must be noted that these traits also apply to the close relative Erotylina (which historically was included in Erotylus).

== Nomenclature ==
Early 18th-century authors usually placed these beetles in a genus named Pseudochrysomela after a description by Johann Voet. This is sometimes cited with the year 1788, the release of Voet's first Catalogus Systematicus Coleopterorum, but was actually only published in the second posthumous volume in 1806. Either way, even though Voet already preferred two-word names instead of the older descriptive ones, his nomenclature was still using pre-Linnean names while looking deceptively Linnean. This confused many subsequent authors, until all of Voet's names were decided to be unavailable under ICZN rules. In the course of clarifying this situation, the type species of Voet's Pseudochrysomela was declared to be P.paramariboensis – another unavailable name, but referring to the same species as Linnaeus' Coccinella gigantea, validly described in 1758 already. Frederick Hope in 1841 declared C.gigantea the type species of Johann Fabricius' 1775 genus Erotylus, making Pseudochrysomela redundant and limiting the practical consequences of its invalidity.

The genus name Pseudochrysomela was re-established validly in 1925 by Maurice Pic, for a new genus of darkling beetles (family Tenebrionidae) which is today placed in the tribe Cnodalonini of subfamily Stenochiinae.

== Species ==
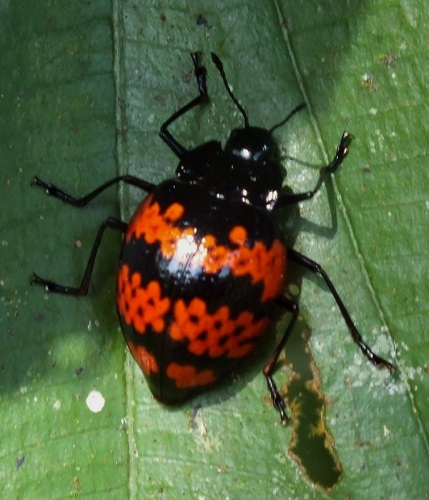
Erotylus dilaceratus

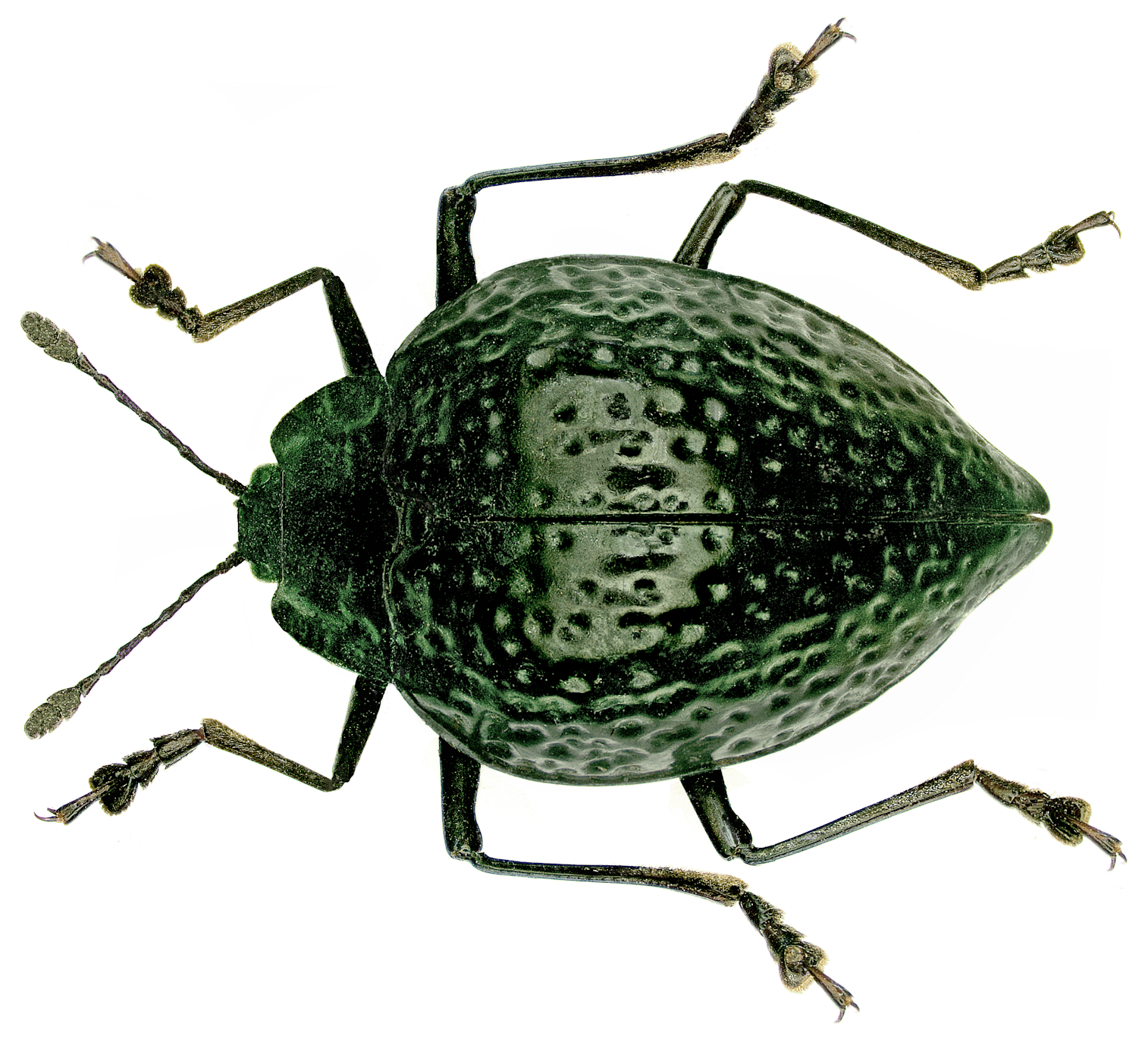
Erotylus spectrum

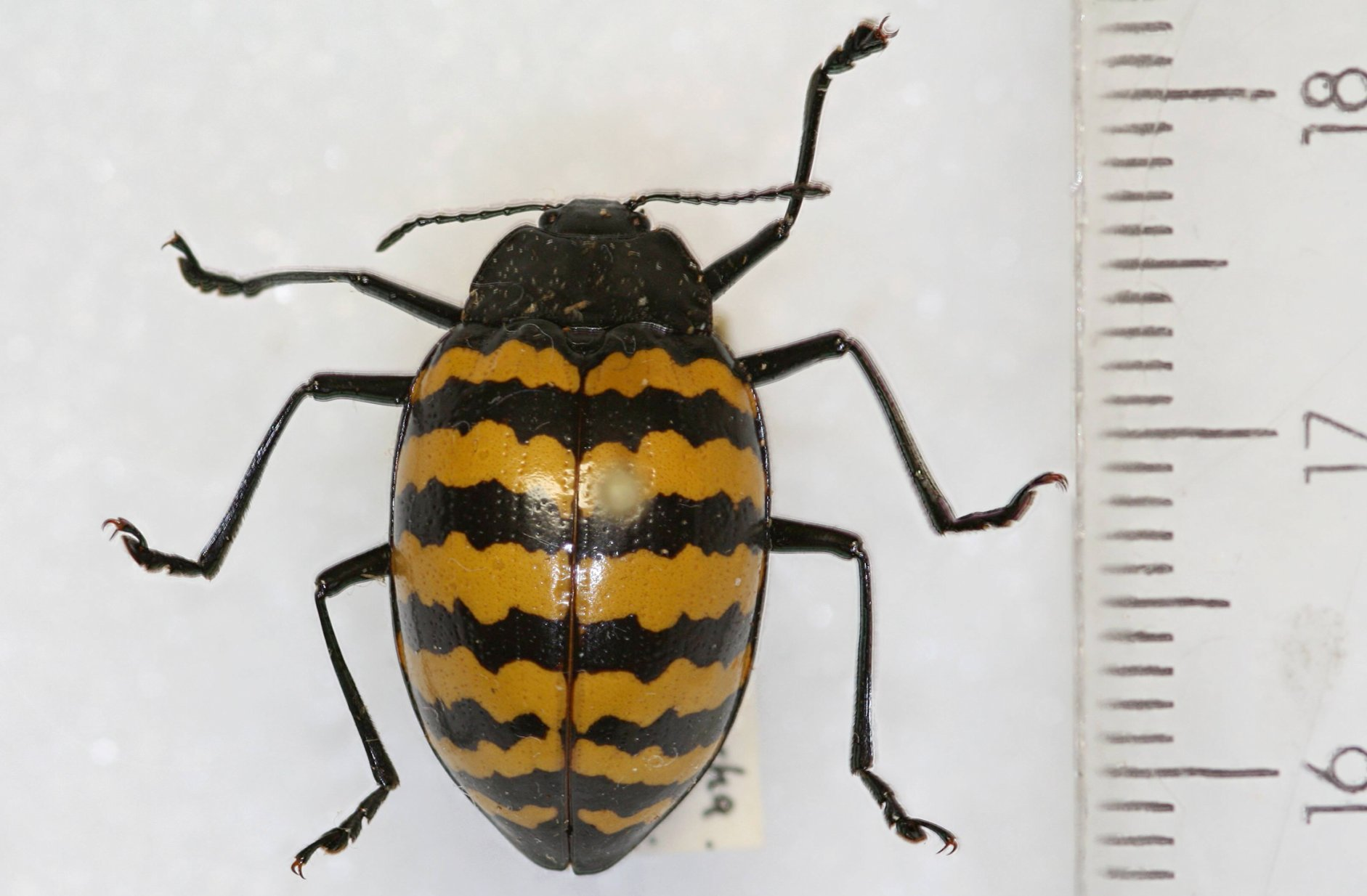
Erotylus taeniatus or a close relative

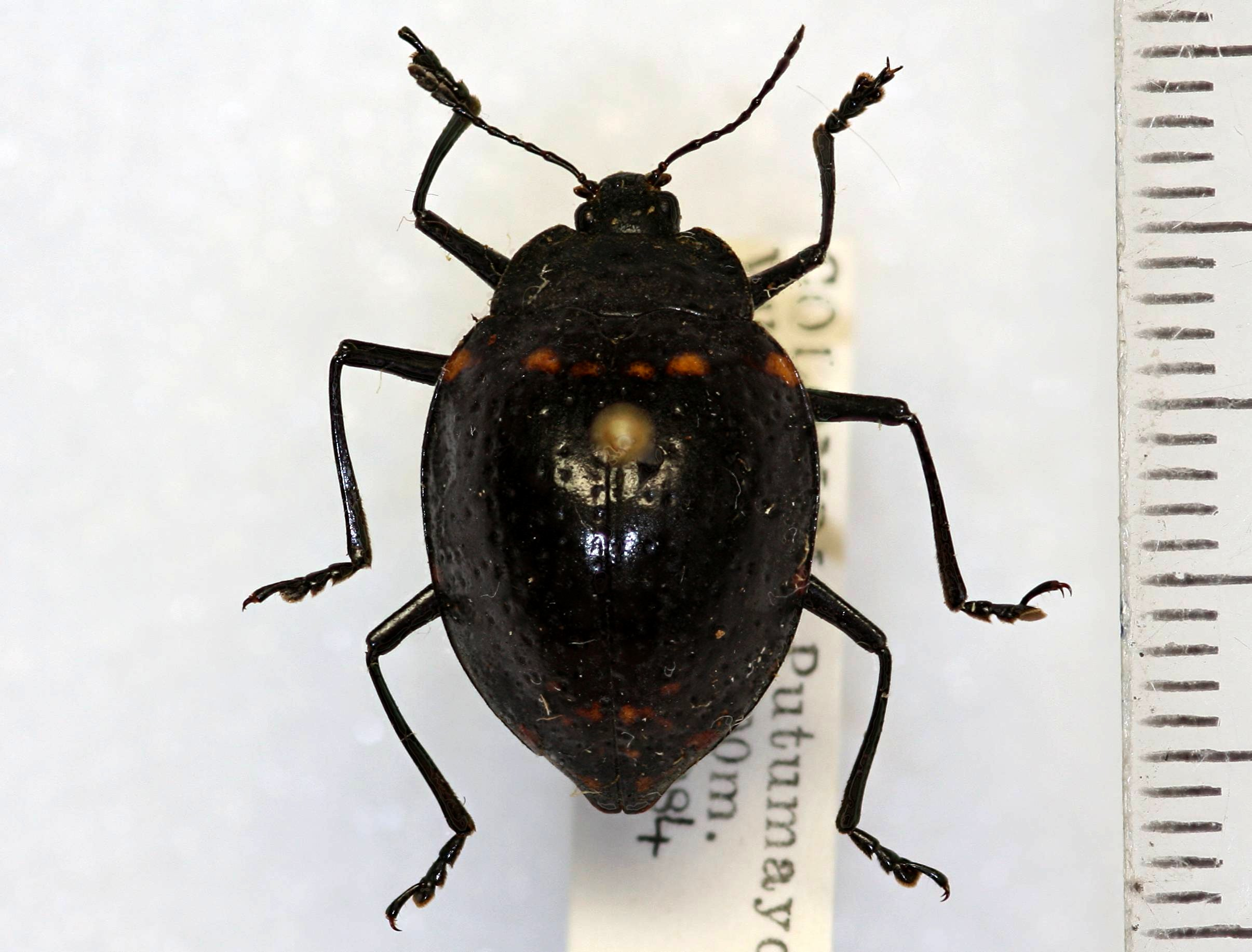
Erotylus variomaculatus

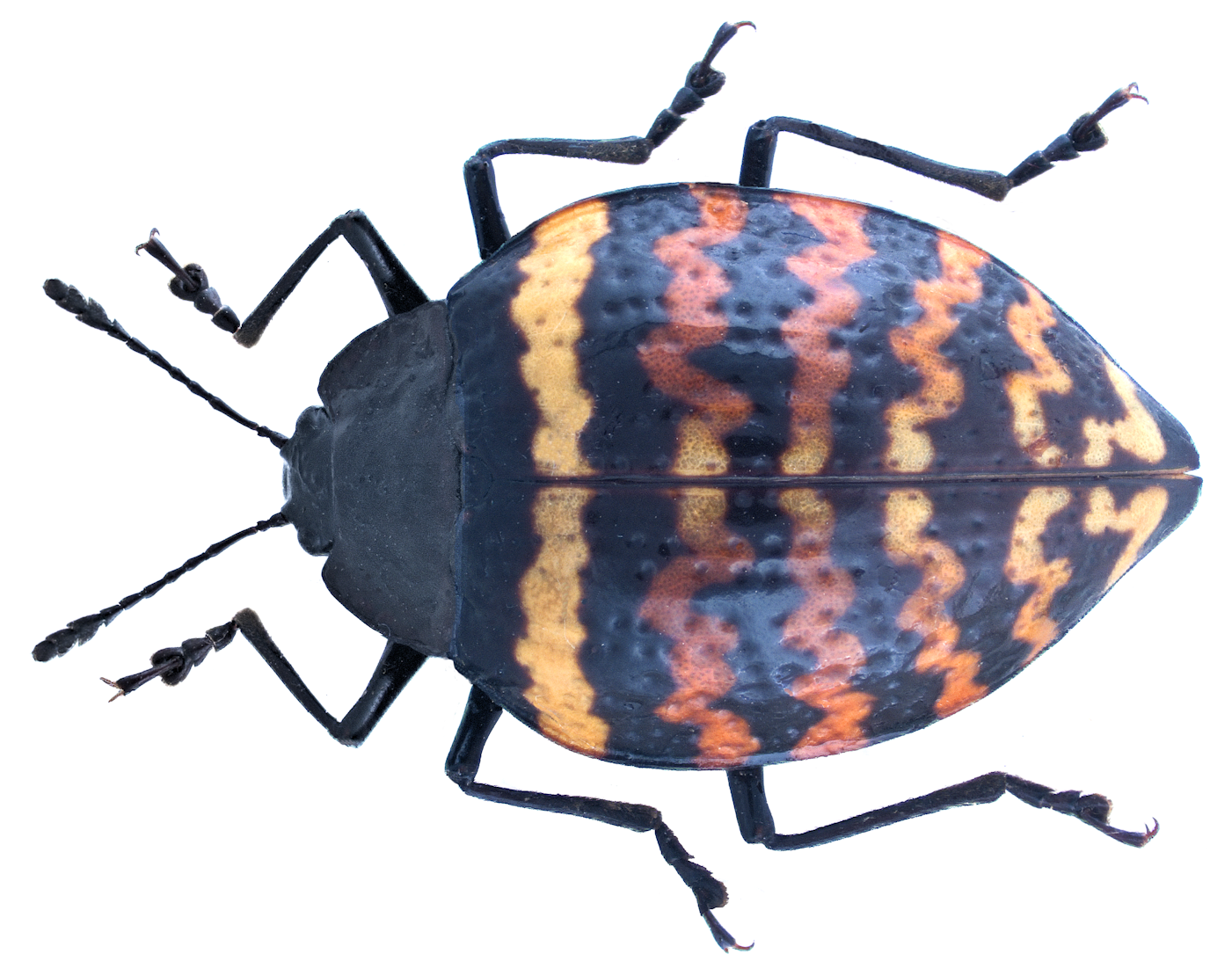
Erotylus voeti

The following species are placed here:

- Erotylus aegrotus Lacordaire, 1842
- Erotylus aequatoris Kirsch, 1883
- Erotylus apiatoides Mader, 1942
- Erotylus aulicus Lacordaire, 1842
- Erotylus bellopictus Kuhnt, 1910
- Erotylus bibalteatus Alvarenga, 1976 (= E.bifasciatus Crotch, 1876 (non Olivier, 1792: preoccupied))
- Erotylus boylei Alvarenga, 1971
- Erotylus buckleyi Crotch, 1876
- Erotylus cassidoides Crotch, 1876
- Erotylus chevrolati Lacordaire, 1842
- Erotylus cingulatus Crotch, 1876
- Erotylus clarosignatus Kuhnt, 1908
- Erotylus contractus Kuhnt, 1908
- Erotylus cornaliae Guérin-Méneville, 1855
- Erotylus crotchi Deelder, 1942
- Erotylus crucifer Kuhnt, 1908
- Erotylus decipiens Crotch, 1876
- Erotylus delenitus Alvarenga, 1976 (= E.hieroglyphicus Crotch, 1876 nec Duponchel 1825: preoccupied)
- Erotylus dilaceratus Kirsch, 1876
- Erotylus egregius Guérin, 1946
- Erotylus elegans Kuhnt, 1908
- Erotylus elegantulus Guérin, 1946
- Erotylus elongatulus Crotch, 1876
- Erotylus flavopunctatus Kuhnt, 1908
- Erotylus flavotaeniatus Kuhnt, 1908
- Erotylus forsteri Delkeskamp, 1957
- Erotylus fulvofasciatus Kuhnt, 1908
- Erotylus giganteus (Linnaeus, 1758)
- Erotylus glaber Kuhnt, 1908
- Erotylus guerinii De Mey, 1838
- Erotylus hexagrammus Lacordaire, 1842
- Erotylus histrio
- Erotylus histrionicus Duponchel, 1825
- Erotylus imitans Kirsch, 1876
- Erotylus incertus Lacordaire, 1842
- Erotylus incomparabilis Perty, 1832
- Erotylus involutus Kuhnt, 1908
- Erotylus jucundus Mader, 1942
- Erotylus kuhnti Deelder, 1942
- Erotylus laetus Deelder, 1942
- Erotylus latreillei Lacordaire, 1842
- Erotylus longulus Guérin, 1956
- Erotylus loratus Erichson, 1847
- Erotylus luteotaeniatus Kuhnt, 1908
- Erotylus margineguttatus Crotch, 1876
- Erotylus marginemaculatus Crotch, 1876
- Erotylus melanostictus Crotch, 1876
- Erotylus mirabilis Kuhnt, 1908
- Erotylus mutatus Mader, 1942
- Erotylus nautae Crotch, 1876
- Erotylus neglectus Mader, 1942
- Erotylus nemo Guérin, 1956
- Erotylus nigrocinctus Kuhnt, 1908
- Erotylus nigromarmoratus Mader, 1942
- Erotylus nigronotatus Gorham, 1888
- Erotylus oblitus Guérin, 1956
- Erotylus ochraceus Guérin, 1946
- Erotylus olivieri Lacordaire, 1842
- Erotylus onagga Lacordaire, 1842
- Erotylus papulosus Lacordaire, 1842
- Erotylus paraensis Alvarenga, 1976
- Erotylus parcepunctatus Crotch, 1876
- Erotylus pardalis Erichson, 1848
- Erotylus parvus Kuhnt, 1908
- Erotylus peregrinus Mader, 1942
- Erotylus permutatus Kuhnt, 1908
- Erotylus peruvianus Crotch, 1876
- Erotylus picturatus Crotch, 1876
- Erotylus pretiosus Perty, 1832
- Erotylus propinquus Kuhnt, 1908
- Erotylus pseudomelanostictus Guérin, 1946
- Erotylus pulcher Mader, 1942
- Erotylus quadricruentatus Alvarenga, 1976
- Erotylus reichei Guérin-Méneville, 1841
- Erotylus rudepunctatus Crotch, 1876
- Erotylus sanguinans Kuhnt, 1908
- Erotylus scaphidomorphoides Crotch, 1876
- Erotylus scenicus Erichson, 1847
- Erotylus schenklingi Kuhnt, 1908
- Erotylus sericeus Delkeskamp, 1957
- Erotylus singularis Kirsch, 1876
- Erotylus spectrum Thomson, 1856
- Erotylus staudingeri Mader, 1935
- Erotylus subreticulatus Guérin-Méneville, 1841
- Erotylus superbus Guérin, 1956
- Erotylus taeniatus Latreille, 1813 (= E.fulgurator, E.sanguiniceps, E.taeniatoides)
- Erotylus terminalis Kuhnt, 1908
- Erotylus theodori Crotch, 1876
- Erotylus trichromaticus Alvarenga, 1976
- Erotylus tripartitus Kuhnt, 1908
- Erotylus ustulatus Erichson, 1847
- Erotylus varians Crotch, 1876
- Erotylus variegatus Fabricius, 1781 (= E.isequeboensis, I.pustulatus, E.sanguinolentus)
- Erotylus variomaculatus Kuhnt, 1908
- Erotylus vinculatus Lacordaire, 1842
- Erotylus voeti Lacordaire, 1842
- Erotylus ziczac Taschenberg, 1870

In addition, most of the large, well-rounded and conspicuous pleasing fungus beetles – as well as some others, such as Triplax species – described before the mid-18th century were at first placed into Erotylus. As their distinctness from E.giganteus and its closest relatives became clear, they were moved to other genera – mostly Erotylinae such as Aegithus, Barytopus, Erotylina, Iphiclus or Prepopharus. The identity of "Erotylus sexfasciatus", described by Fabricius in 1792, is still unresolved.

Another supposed member of this genus, "E.flavipes", described from Jamaica by Fabricius in 1781, turned out to be the leaf beetle Colaspis occidentalis described by Linnaeus in 1758.

It is also likely that undescribed Erotylus species exist. A review of the UPN collection found 5 identifiable species represented among the 34 Erotylus specimens, with most occurring in the Andes but some in the eastern lowlands of Colombia, and the upland species E.taeniatus markedly more commonly and widely found than the others. But almost two-thirds of the Erotylus in this collection (22 specimens) could not be assigned to a species known from the region. These include collections from the uplands and both slopes of the Andes.

In addition, fossil remains found in copal were assigned to this genus.
