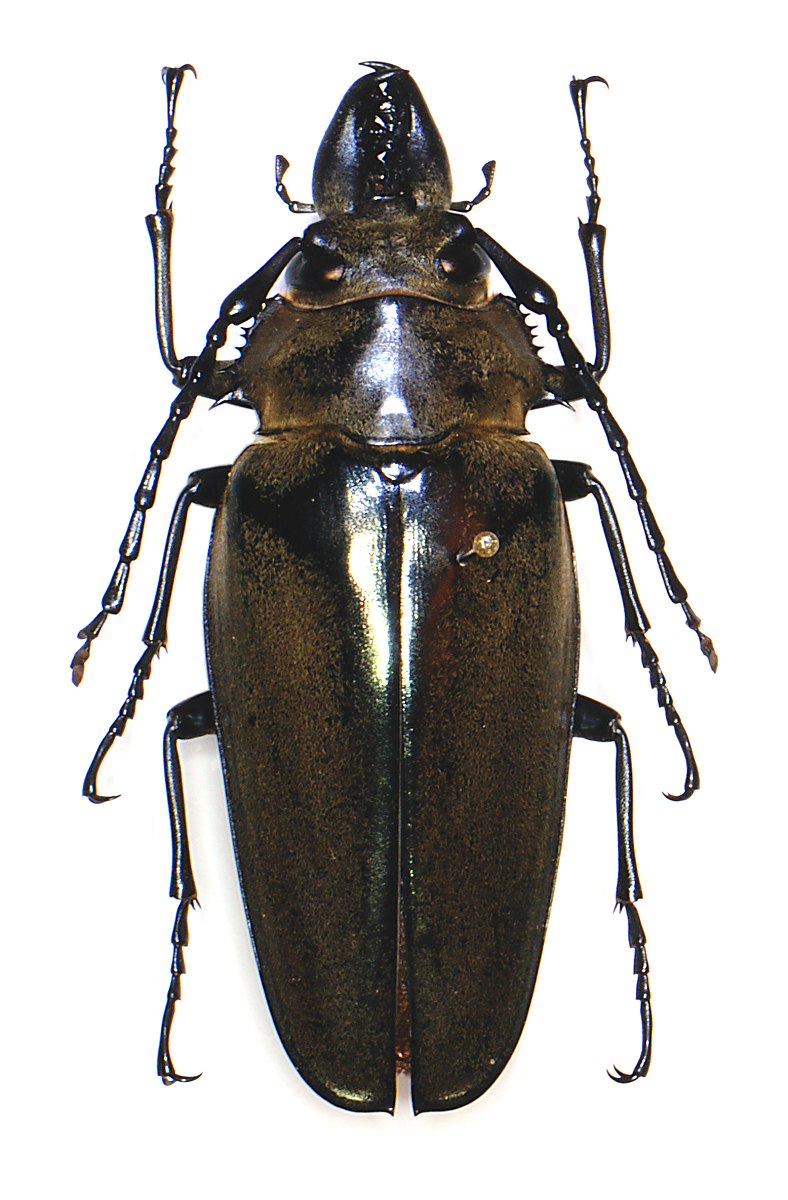
- Autocrates vitalisi

Scientific classification
- Kingdom: Animalia
- Phylum: Arthropoda
- Clade: Pancrustacea
- Class: Insecta
- Order: Coleoptera
- Suborder: Polyphaga
- Infraorder: Cucujiformia
- Family: Trictenotomidae
- Genus: Autocrates
- Species: A. vitalisi

Binomial name
- Autocrates vitalisi Vulliet, 1912

= Autocrates vitalisi =

Species of beetle

Autocrates vitalisi is a species of beetle in the Trictenotomidae family. It was described in 1912 by Vulliet.
