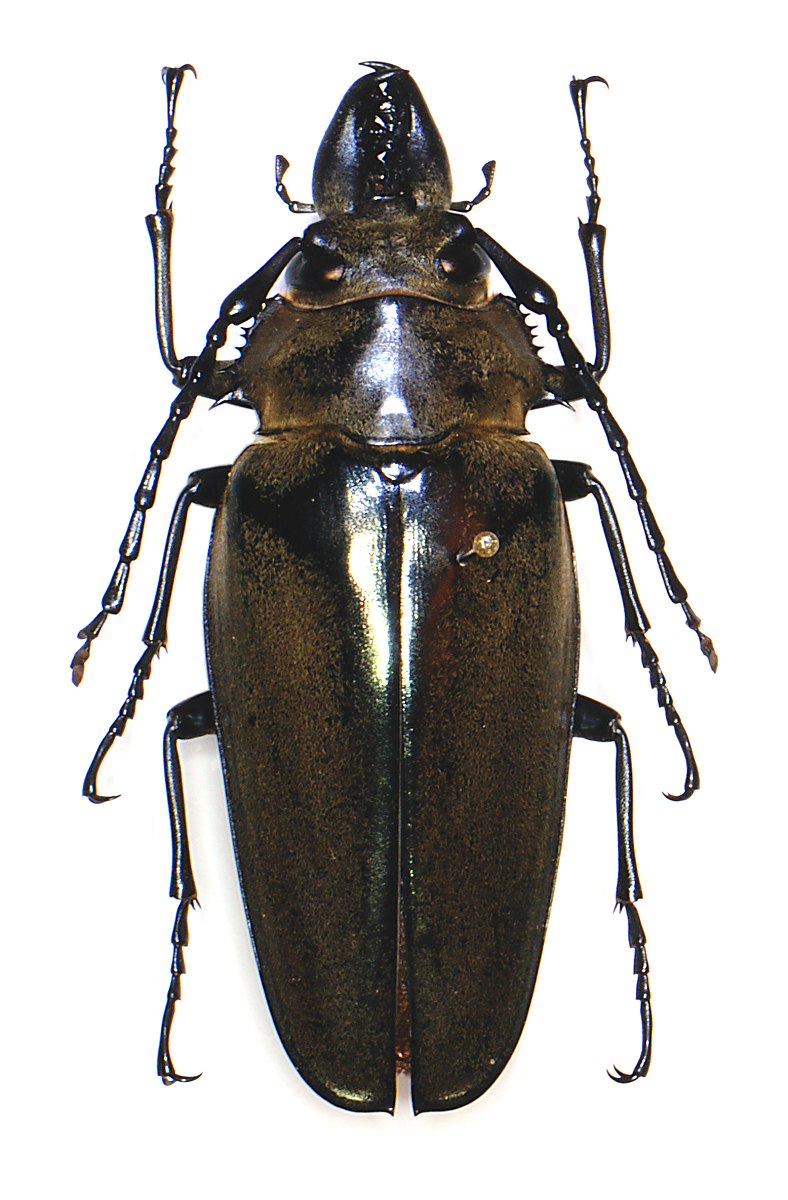
- Autocrates vitalisi

Scientific classification
- Kingdom: Animalia
- Phylum: Arthropoda
- Clade: Pancrustacea
- Class: Insecta
- Order: Coleoptera
- Suborder: Polyphaga
- Infraorder: Cucujiformia
- Superfamily: Tenebrionoidea
- Family: Trictenotomidae; Blanchard, 1845

Type species
- Trictenotoma aenea Westwood, 1846,

= Trictenotomidae =

Family of beetles

The Trictenotomidae are a small family of beetles in the superfamily Tenebrionoidea, containing fifteen species in two genera. Most species are found in the Oriental realm where they live in montane forest habitats. The family is considered, based on larval characters as well as sequence-based studies, to be closely related to the Salpingidae.

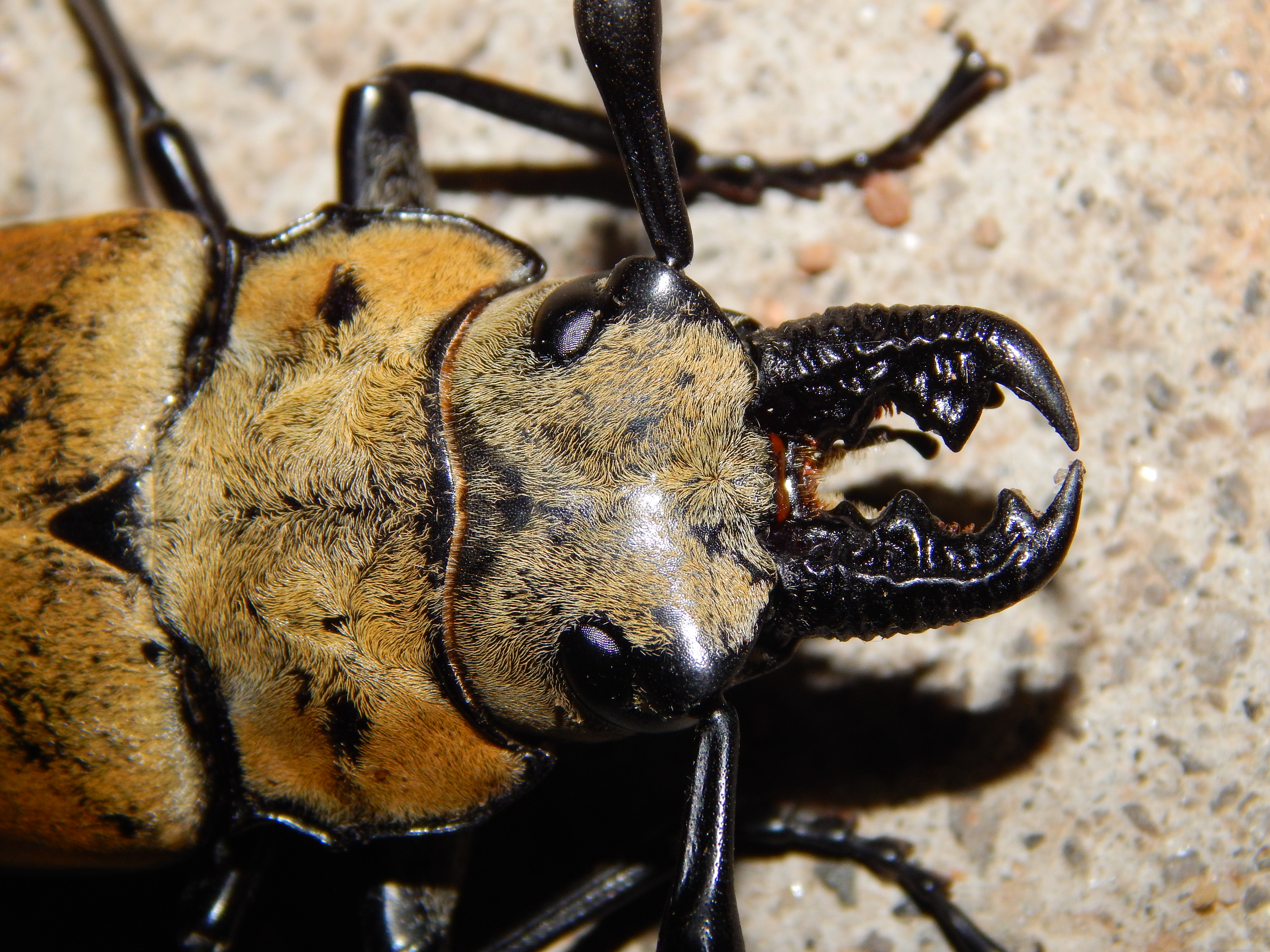
Trictenotoma grayi

Adult Trictenotomidae can be mistaken for Cerambycidae (Prioninae) or Lucanidae but their 5-5-4 tarsal formula makes them distinctive. They have a long 11-segmented antenna. There are no fossil species known as yet, and nearly all the species are found mainly along the Himalayas extending into China, Korea, the Sunda Islands, and the Philippine Archipelago. Trictenotoma grayi is found in the Western Ghats of peninsular India while T. templetonii is found in Sri Lanka. Adult beetles are attracted to lights and specimens are found widely in collections around the world; however, very little was known of their life-history until the habits of Trictenotoma formosana were studied in captivity in Taiwan in 2019. Based on that species, these are thought to breed in wood, the eggs being laid under bark. The eggs hatch after about 10 days. The larvae are carnivorous and can be cannibalistic. They build tunnels in soft wood in which they stay. They feed on their exuviae and may undergo 8–9 moults over the course of one and a half years before they pupate. The pupae eclose in 40 to 46 days as adults. Adults feed on tree sap.

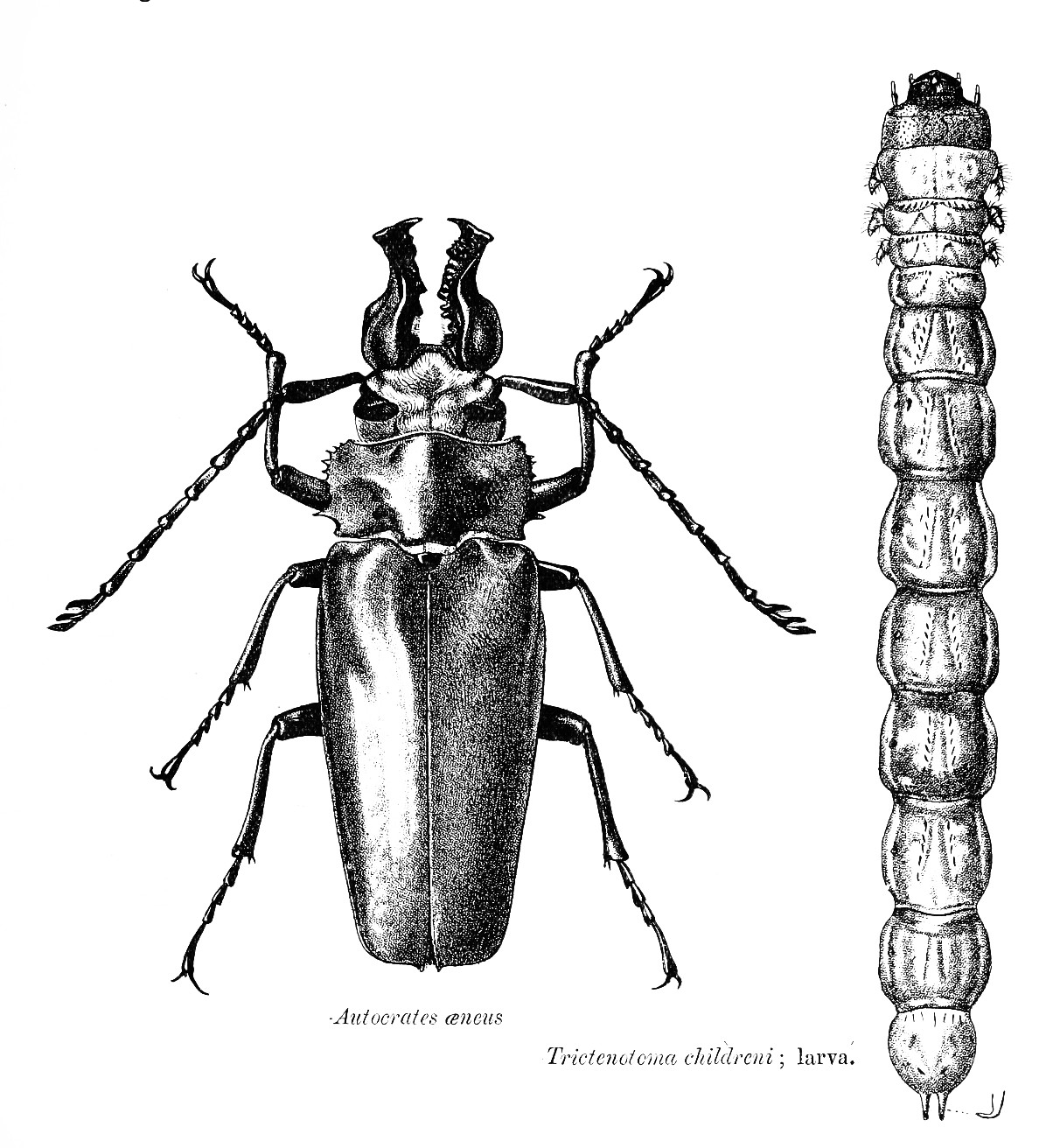
Adult Autocrates aeneus and larva of Trictenotoma childreni

The scape of the antenna is longer than segments 2 and 3 together and the second segment isg rounded. The eight antennal segment is simple in Trictenotoma and has lateral projections in Autocrates. The terminal three antennal segments form a club.

- Genus Autocrates J. Thomson, 1860
  - Autocrates aeneus Parry, 1847
  - Autocrates maqueti Drumont, 2006
  - Autocrates obertheuri Vuillet, 1910
  - Autocrates ivanovi Drumont, 2016
  - Autocrates vitalisi Vuillet, 1912
- Genus Trictenotoma Gray, 1832
  - Trictenotoma childreni Gray, 1832
  - Trictenotoma cindarella Kreische, 1921
  - Trictenotoma davidi Deyrolle, 1875
  - Trictenotoma formosana Kreische, 1920
  - Trictenotoma grayi Smith, 1851
  - Trictenotoma lansbergi Dohrn, 1882
  - Trictenotoma mniszechi Deyrolle, 1875
  - Trictenotoma mouhoti Deyrolle, 1875
  - Trictenotoma pollocki Telnov & Drumont, 2020
  - Trictenotoma templetoni Westwood, 1848
  - Trictenotoma westwoodi Deyrolle, 1875
