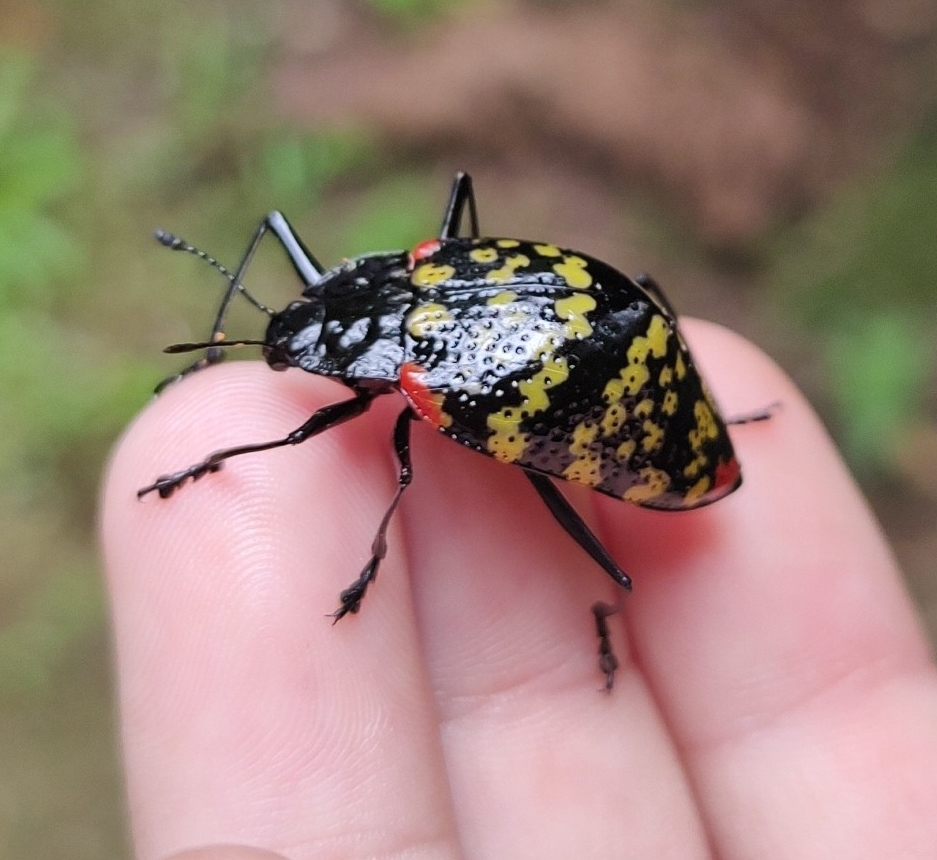

Scientific classification
- Kingdom: Animalia
- Phylum: Arthropoda
- Clade: Pancrustacea
- Class: Insecta
- Order: Coleoptera
- Suborder: Polyphaga
- Infraorder: Cucujiformia
- Family: Erotylidae
- Genus: Erotylus
- Species: E. histrio

Binomial name
- Erotylus histrio Fabricius, 1787

= Erotylus histrio =

Species of beetle

Erotylus histrio is a species in the pleasing fungus beetle (family (Erotylidae). It belongs to the subfamily Erotylinae and is known with certainty only from French Guiana and eastern Brazil.

== Description ==
Erotylus histrio can reach a length of more than 1 inch (19.5-26 mm) and a width around half an inch (11-14.5 mm) as adults, placing them among the largest Erotylus; in fact, it is a giant even among its entire family. Its shape is notably elongated, resembling the smaller E.aegrotus but contrasting with other huge Erotylus such as E.giganteus, E.permutatus and E.spectrum.

Adults of this beetle are largely black, with irregular bands formed by yellowish spots across the elytra.

== Distribution ==
This species was scientifically described by Johann Fabricius in 1787, not long after Linnaeus had established modern zoological nomenclature. The type specimen was procured from Cayenne, French Guiana; it is now at Glasgow University in the Hunterian Museum collection.

In the famous George Crotch collection at the UMZC, E.histrio is only moderately common among almost 40 members of its genus, owing to numerous large type series of the many Erotylus species described by Crotch. On the other hand, in the 1941-42 review of the roughly 30 Iphiclus species in the Dutch Naturalis collection, with 20 specimens E.histrio was more common than any other member of this genus. And while among the other giant Erotylus at Naturalis, E.giganteus was abundantly represented by specimens from the Dutch colony of Suriname (8 of the 14 total), the widespread E.permutatus had only 7 mostly Brazilian specimens and the upper Amazonian E.spectrum a mere 3. The next most abundant species at Naturalis was the mid-sized E.variegatus with 17 specimens, also mostly from the Guyanas.

While E.histrio may not be as locally common as other giant Erotylus, it does not seem to be rare and occurs over a wide range: apart from 5 Cayenne specimens, Naturalis had 10 Brazilian ones, of which 2 were from Espirito Santo, one from Rio de Janeiro city or state (and another was received from the museum there), and yet another from the city or state of São Paulo. Four Naturalis specimens had no locality data, including one formerly in the C.J.Dixon collection, and another one which Paul Kuhnt used to describe a variety minor. The last Naturalis specimen is intriguing; it supposedly was procured by Johannes Corporaal in Suriname. While E.histrio does not seem to have otherwise been recorded from this country, it conceivably might do so; on the other hand, Corporaal probably bought this specimen from a trader in the Netherlands when he was at the Artis instead of collecting it himself, so the locality is suspect. As it stands, E.histrio can probably be met with in much of South America east of the Jari River and Tocantins River; how far it ranges inland is still not at all known almost 250 years after it was first described.
