= Lamproserica kakomae =

Scientific classification
- Kingdom: Animalia
- Phylum: Arthropoda
- Class: Insecta
- Order: Coleoptera
- Suborder: Polyphaga
- Infraorder: Scarabaeiformia
- Family: Scarabaeidae
- Genus: Lamproserica
- Species: L. kakomae

Binomial name
- Lamproserica kakomae Brenske, 1902

Species of beetle

Lamproserica kakomae is a species of beetle of the family Scarabaeidae. It is found in Tanzania.

== Description ==
Adults reach a length of about 5.6 mm. They are very similar to Lamproserica mombasana and Lamproserica salaama, but narrower and therefore the striae on the elytra are closer together, with distinct punctures. The pronotum is weakly but evenly rounded at the sides, without projecting hind angles.
