= Heterotrochalus =

Scientific classification
- Kingdom: Animalia
- Phylum: Arthropoda
- Clade: Pancrustacea
- Class: Insecta
- Order: Coleoptera
- Suborder: Polyphaga
- Infraorder: Scarabaeiformia
- Family: Scarabaeidae
- Subfamily: Sericinae
- Tribe: Sericini
- Genus: Heterotrochalus; Moser, 1918
- Species: H. macrophyllus

Binomial name
- Heterotrochalus macrophyllus Moser, 1918

Genus of beetles

Heterotrochalus is a genus of beetle of the family Scarabaeidae. It is monotypic, being represented by the single species, Heterotrochalus macrophyllus, which is found in Togo.

== Description ==
Adults reach a length of about 5.5–6 mm. They are brown and dull, with a strong silky sheen. The antennae are reddish-yellow. The pronotum is densely and finely punctate and the elytra have rows of punctures, with the intervals moderately densely punctured.
