= Apotriodonta =

Scientific classification
- Kingdom: Animalia
- Phylum: Arthropoda
- Clade: Pancrustacea
- Class: Insecta
- Order: Coleoptera
- Suborder: Polyphaga
- Infraorder: Scarabaeiformia
- Family: Scarabaeidae
- Subfamily: Sericinae
- Tribe: Sericini
- Genus: Apotriodonta; Baraud, 1962
- Species: A. hispanica

Binomial name
- Apotriodonta hispanica (Baraud, 1962)

Synonyms
- Triodonta hispanica Baraud, 1962

Genus of beetles

Apotriodonta is a genus of beetle of the family Scarabaeidae. It is monotypic, being represented by the single species, Apotriodonta hispanica, which is found in Portugal and Spain.

== Description ==
Adults reach a length of about 6-7 mm. The head, pronotum and elytra are black and glossy, with dense white pubescence, consisting of short hairs, as well as long, erect setae.
