= Etiserica =

Scientific classification
- Kingdom: Animalia
- Phylum: Arthropoda
- Class: Insecta
- Order: Coleoptera
- Suborder: Polyphaga
- Infraorder: Scarabaeiformia
- Family: Scarabaeidae
- Subfamily: Sericinae
- Tribe: Sericini
- Genus: Etiserica; Péringuey, 1904
- Species: E. simplex

Binomial name
- Etiserica simplex Péringuey, 1904

Genus of beetles

Etiserica is a genus of beetle of the family Scarabaeidae. It is monotypic, being represented by the single species, Etiserica simplex, which is found in Zimbabwe.

== Description ==
Adults reach a length of about 7 mm. They are testaceous, with the elytra testaceous-yellow, and without any sheen. The scutellum is long and punctulate. The elytra are elongate, not much convex, somewhat deeply striate, and the striae are punctulate.
