= Neosericania =

Scientific classification
- Kingdom: Animalia
- Phylum: Arthropoda
- Clade: Pancrustacea
- Class: Insecta
- Order: Coleoptera
- Suborder: Polyphaga
- Infraorder: Scarabaeiformia
- Family: Scarabaeidae
- Subfamily: Sericinae
- Tribe: Sericini
- Genus: Neosericania; Miyake & Yamaya, 1994

Genus of leaf beetles

Neosericania is a genus of beetles belonging to the family Scarabaeidae.

== Species ==
- Neosericania excisoclypeata Miyake & Yamaya, 1994
- Neosericania habonensis Ahrens, 2002
- Neosericania nitida (Kobayashi, 1985)
