= Neuroserica unguiculata =

Scientific classification
- Kingdom: Animalia
- Phylum: Arthropoda
- Clade: Pancrustacea
- Class: Insecta
- Order: Coleoptera
- Suborder: Polyphaga
- Infraorder: Scarabaeiformia
- Family: Scarabaeidae
- Genus: Neuroserica
- Species: N. unguiculata

Binomial name
- Neuroserica unguiculata Moser, 1924

Species of beetle

Neuroserica unguiculata is a species of beetle of the family Scarabaeidae. It is found in Tanzania.

== Description ==
Adults reach a length of about 5.5 mm (0.22 in). They are similar to Neuroserica fulvescens, but more reddish in colour, with dull hind femora which are not as strongly narrowed towards the end.
