= Mesoserica =

Scientific classification
- Kingdom: Animalia
- Phylum: Arthropoda
- Class: Insecta
- Order: Coleoptera
- Suborder: Polyphaga
- Infraorder: Scarabaeiformia
- Family: Scarabaeidae
- Subfamily: Sericinae
- Tribe: Sericini
- Genus: Mesoserica; Brenske, 1898
- Species: M. transvaalensis

Binomial name
- Mesoserica transvaalensis Brenske, 1902

Genus of beetles

Mesoserica is a genus of beetle of the family Scarabaeidae. It is monotypic, being represented by the single species, Mesoserica transvaalensis, which is found in South Africa (Gauteng).

== Description ==
Adults reach a length of about 6 mm. They are brown and shining (with the head and prothorax somewhat more reddish), narrowly ovate and finely punctate.
