= Glaphyserica =

Scientific classification
- Kingdom: Animalia
- Phylum: Arthropoda
- Class: Insecta
- Order: Coleoptera
- Suborder: Polyphaga
- Infraorder: Scarabaeiformia
- Family: Scarabaeidae
- Subfamily: Sericinae
- Tribe: Sericini
- Genus: Glaphyserica; Brenske, 1899
- Species: G. humeralis

Binomial name
- Glaphyserica humeralis Brenske, 1900

Genus of beetles

Glaphyserica is a genus of beetle of the family Scarabaeidae. It is monotypic, being represented by the single species, Glaphyserica humeralis, which is found in Madagascar.

== Description ==
Adults reach a length of about 6.8 mm. They have an oval, somewhat elongated body. There have an indeterminate dark brown colour with a bluish sheen, and are faintly tomentose and strongly opalescent. The elytra are strongly ribbed, and the shoulders and legs are glossy yellow. The underside is dull.
