= Heteroserica =

Scientific classification
- Kingdom: Animalia
- Phylum: Arthropoda
- Class: Insecta
- Order: Coleoptera
- Suborder: Polyphaga
- Infraorder: Scarabaeiformia
- Family: Scarabaeidae
- Subfamily: Sericinae
- Tribe: Sericini
- Genus: Heteroserica; Brenske, 1899

Genus of leaf beetles

Heteroserica is a genus of beetles belonging to the family Scarabaeidae.

== Species ==
- Heteroserica paradoxa Brenske, 1900
- Heteroserica reticulata Frey, 1975
- Heteroserica tridens Frey, 1975
