= Plotopuserica =

Scientific classification
- Kingdom: Animalia
- Phylum: Arthropoda
- Class: Insecta
- Order: Coleoptera
- Suborder: Polyphaga
- Infraorder: Scarabaeiformia
- Family: Scarabaeidae
- Subfamily: Sericinae
- Tribe: Sericini
- Genus: Plotopuserica; Brenske, 1899
- Species: P. darwiniana

Binomial name
- Plotopuserica darwiniana Brenske, 1900

Genus of beetles

Plotopuserica is a genus of beetle of the family Scarabaeidae. It is monotypic, being represented by the single species, Plotopuserica darwiniana, which is found in Madagascar.

== Description ==
Adults reach a length of about 7 mm. They have an elliptical, uniformly glossy chestnut brown body. The pronotum is distinctly wider than long, the anterior angles project strongly, the anterior margin is slightly projecting in the middle, the sides are evenly but very weakly rounded posteriorly, with distinct short marginal setae and a row of setae next to them, the posterior angles are obtuse but not rounded, the convex surface is densely and finely punctate behind the anterior margin and in the anterior angles with individual setae. The scutellum is elongate and pointed. The elytra have fine, short, brown, erect setae. They are evenly and densely punctate, somewhat slightly wrinkled, with a tiny hair in each puncture.
