= Thrymoserica =

Scientific classification
- Kingdom: Animalia
- Phylum: Arthropoda
- Class: Insecta
- Order: Coleoptera
- Suborder: Polyphaga
- Infraorder: Scarabaeiformia
- Family: Scarabaeidae
- Subfamily: Sericinae
- Tribe: Sericini
- Genus: Thrymoserica; Brenske, 1900
- Species: T. fabulosa

Binomial name
- Thrymoserica fabulosa Brenske, 1901

Genus of beetles

Thrymoserica is a genus of beetle of the family Scarabaeidae. It is monotypic, being represented by the single species, Thrymoserica fabulosa, which is found in Tanzania.

== Description ==
Adults reach a length of about 11 mm. They are dull, brown and opalescent, with shiny legs. The head, middle of the pronotum and spots on the sides of the elytra are greenish. The frons is densely tomentose. The pronotum is short, broad, scarcely projecting anteriorly in the middle, also the anterior angles less strongly projecting, the sides strongly rounded anteriorly, straight from the middle onwards, the very finely rounded posterior angles slightly projecting, the surface widely punctate with a narrow, smooth midline and a few lateral unpunctate spots. The scutellum is large and elongated, with a black spot on either side. The elytra have a dense row of punctures in the striae and the intervals are distinctly convex and unpunctate, with fine setae widely spaced along the lateral margins.
