= Straliga =

Scientific classification
- Kingdom: Animalia
- Phylum: Arthropoda
- Class: Insecta
- Order: Coleoptera
- Suborder: Polyphaga
- Infraorder: Scarabaeiformia
- Family: Scarabaeidae
- Subfamily: Sericinae
- Tribe: Sericini
- Genus: Straliga; Fairmaire, 1901
- Species: S. croceicollis

Binomial name
- Straliga croceicollis Fairmaire, 1901

Genus of beetles

Straliga is a genus of beetle of the family Scarabaeidae. It is monotypic, being represented by the single species, Straliga croceicollis, which is found in Madagascar.

== Description ==
Adults reach a length of about 10–11 mm. They have an oblong-ovate, black, quite shiny body, with a yellow pronotum.
