= Setiserica =

Scientific classification
- Kingdom: Animalia
- Phylum: Arthropoda
- Class: Insecta
- Order: Coleoptera
- Suborder: Polyphaga
- Infraorder: Scarabaeiformia
- Family: Scarabaeidae
- Subfamily: Sericinae
- Tribe: Sericini
- Genus: Setiserica; Miyake, 2002

Genus of leaf beetles

Setiserica is a genus of beetles belonging to the family Scarabaeidae.

== Species ==
- Setiserica pygmaea Miyake, Yamaguchi & Akiyama, 2002
- Setiserica thailandica Miyake, Yamaguchi & Aoki, 2002
