= Antitrochalus =

Scientific classification
- Kingdom: Animalia
- Phylum: Arthropoda
- Clade: Pancrustacea
- Class: Insecta
- Order: Coleoptera
- Suborder: Polyphaga
- Infraorder: Scarabaeiformia
- Family: Scarabaeidae
- Subfamily: Sericinae
- Tribe: Sericini
- Genus: Antitrochalus; Brenske, 1900
- Species: A. abyssinicus

Binomial name
- Antitrochalus abyssinicus Brenske, 1902

Genus of beetles

Antitrochalus is a genus of beetle of the family Scarabaeidae. It is monotypic, being represented by the single species, Antitrochalus abyssinicus, which is found in Ethiopia.

== Description ==
Adults reach a length of about 5 mm. They have a deep black, dull body, with a silky sheen. The elytra are entirely black or dark reddish-brown with a narrow black suture, a black base and a broad black lateral margin, as well as an elongated black stripe in the middle, which touches neither the tip nor the base.
