= Diaphoroserica =

Scientific classification
- Kingdom: Animalia
- Phylum: Arthropoda
- Clade: Pancrustacea
- Class: Insecta
- Order: Coleoptera
- Suborder: Polyphaga
- Infraorder: Scarabaeiformia
- Family: Scarabaeidae
- Subfamily: Sericinae
- Tribe: Sericini
- Genus: Diaphoroserica; Péringuey, 1904
- Species: D. mashona

Binomial name
- Diaphoroserica mashona Péringuey, 1904

Genus of beetles

Diaphoroserica is a genus of beetle of the family Scarabaeidae. It is monotypic, being represented by the single species, Diaphoroserica mashona, which is found in Zimbabwe.

== Description ==
Adults reach a length of about 6–7 mm. They are rufescent, with a fleshy tinge and a more or less strong opaline sheen. The antennae are testaceous. The clypeus has a plain frontal suture, arcuately emarginate in front but with the margin reflexed and slightly aculeate in the centre, the outer angles are distinct, but not prominent, the surface is deeply punctured, the head less so. The prothorax is slightly narrowed laterally in front, sinuate behind and also along the base, sloping forwards, vaguely punctulate only along the base and sides. The scutellum is long and aciculate and the elytra are elongated, plainly striato-punctate with the intervals sub-tectiform, the punctures of the striae impinge on each side of the sub-tectiform intervals.
