= Xenotrochalus =

Scientific classification
- Kingdom: Animalia
- Phylum: Arthropoda
- Clade: Pancrustacea
- Class: Insecta
- Order: Coleoptera
- Suborder: Polyphaga
- Infraorder: Scarabaeiformia
- Family: Scarabaeidae
- Subfamily: Sericinae
- Tribe: Sericini
- Genus: Xenotrochalus; Moser, 1917
- Species: X. mirabilis

Binomial name
- Xenotrochalus mirabilis Moser, 1917

Genus of beetles

Xenotrochalus is a genus of beetle of the family Scarabaeidae. It is monotypic, being represented by the single species, Xenotrochalus mirabilis, which is found in Cameroon and the Democratic Republic of the Congo.

== Description ==
Adults reach a length of about 4.5 mm. They are shiny, with a red body and black elytra.
