= Glycyserica =

Scientific classification
- Kingdom: Animalia
- Phylum: Arthropoda
- Class: Insecta
- Order: Coleoptera
- Suborder: Polyphaga
- Infraorder: Scarabaeiformia
- Family: Scarabaeidae
- Subfamily: Sericinae
- Tribe: Sericini
- Genus: Glycyserica; Brenske, 1899
- Species: G. depravata

Binomial name
- Glycyserica depravata Brenske, 1900

Genus of beetles

Glycyserica is a genus of beetle of the family Scarabaeidae. It is monotypic, being represented by the single species, Glycyserica depravata, which is found in Madagascar.

== Description ==
Adults reach a length of about 4.6 mm. They have a rounded-oval, dull, reddish-yellow and vividly opalescent body. The frons is densely punctate, with a fine longitudinal line. The pronotum is broad, slightly projecting anteriorly, the hind angles slightly rounded. The scutellum is narrow. On the elytra, the suture and five costa are distinctly raised, without punctures. In the striae are two distinct rows of punctures. From the 5th costa to the outer margin, the costa are much weaker, less distinct, and the punctation more confused.
