= Trachyserica =

Scientific classification
- Kingdom: Animalia
- Phylum: Arthropoda
- Class: Insecta
- Order: Coleoptera
- Suborder: Polyphaga
- Infraorder: Scarabaeiformia
- Family: Scarabaeidae
- Subfamily: Sericinae
- Tribe: Sericini
- Genus: Trachyserica; Brenske, 1899
- Species: T. longitarsa

Binomial name
- Trachyserica longitarsa Brenske, 1900

Genus of beetles

Trachyserica is a genus of beetle of the family Scarabaeidae. It is monotypic, being represented by the single species, Trachyserica longitarsa, which is found in Madagascar.

== Description ==
Adults reach a length of about 5 mm. They have a narrow, shiny, dark brown body, with a somewhat metallic sheen. There are scattered setae on the elytra and more densely packed setae at the tarsal joints.
