= Ercomoana =

Scientific classification
- Kingdom: Animalia
- Phylum: Arthropoda
- Class: Insecta
- Order: Coleoptera
- Suborder: Polyphaga
- Infraorder: Scarabaeiformia
- Family: Scarabaeidae
- Subfamily: Sericinae
- Tribe: Sericini
- Genus: Ercomoana; Lacroix, 1994
- Species: E. longiclava

Binomial name
- Ercomoana longiclava Lacroix, 1994

Genus of beetles

Ercomoana is a genus of beetle of the family Scarabaeidae. It is monotypic, being represented by the single species, Ercomoana longiclava, which is found on the Comores.

== Description ==
Adults reach a length of about 7–8 mm. They have a slightly elongate body. The upper surface is reddish-brown with the elytra darker. The clypeus and frons have strong, rather irregular punctation and there are few erect hairs on the sides of the frons. The pronotum has strong, rather dense punctation and a few erect hairs on the anterior part, along the margin and on the sides towards the base. The elytra have strong and close striae and densely punctate interstriae.
