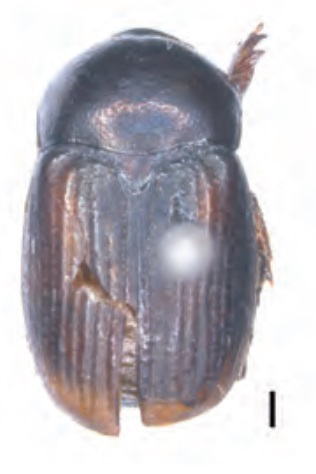

Scientific classification
- Kingdom: Animalia
- Phylum: Arthropoda
- Clade: Pancrustacea
- Class: Insecta
- Order: Coleoptera
- Suborder: Polyphaga
- Infraorder: Scarabaeiformia
- Family: Scarabaeidae
- Subfamily: Sericinae
- Tribe: Sericini
- Genus: Pachyderoserica; Moser, 1920
- Species: P. crassicollis

Binomial name
- Pachyderoserica crassicollis Moser, 1920

= Pachyderoserica =

Genus of beetles

Pachyderoserica is a genus of beetles in the family Scarabaeidae. It is monotypic, being represented by the single species, Pachyderoserica crassicollis, which is found in southern India (Madura, Shembaganur).

== Description ==
Adults reach a length of about 6 mm. They are black or blackish-brown and silky. The elytra have a longitudinal band. The head is moderately densely punctate and sparingly yellowish-setose. The antennae are yellow.
