= Loricatarsa =

Scientific classification
- Kingdom: Animalia
- Phylum: Arthropoda
- Class: Insecta
- Order: Coleoptera
- Suborder: Polyphaga
- Infraorder: Scarabaeiformia
- Family: Scarabaeidae
- Subfamily: Sericinae
- Tribe: Sericini
- Genus: Loricatarsa; Frey, 1969
- Species: L. garnyi

Binomial name
- Loricatarsa garnyi Frey, 1969

Genus of beetles

Loricatarsa is a genus of beetle of the family Scarabaeidae. It is monotypic, being represented by the single species, Loricatarsa garnyi, which is found in Botswana.

== Description ==
Adults reach a length of about 6–7 mm. The upper and lower surfaces are reddish-yellow and shiny without an opalescent sheen. The upper surface and pygidium are glabrous, the sides with scattered yellowish setae. There are yellowish cilia along the lateral margins of the pronotum and elytra.
