= Homaloserica =

Scientific classification
- Kingdom: Animalia
- Phylum: Arthropoda
- Class: Insecta
- Order: Coleoptera
- Suborder: Polyphaga
- Infraorder: Scarabaeiformia
- Family: Scarabaeidae
- Subfamily: Sericinae
- Tribe: Sericini
- Genus: Homaloserica; Brenske, 1898
- Species: H. fessa

Binomial name
- Homaloserica fessa Brenske, 1901

Genus of beetles

Homaloserica is a genus of beetle of the family Scarabaeidae. It is monotypic, being represented by the single species, Homaloserica fessa, which is found in Tanzania.

== Description ==
Adults reach a length of about 7 mm. They have an elongate, dull, dirty yellow body with brownish spots on the pronotum and elytra. The pronotum is not projecting forward in the middle anteriorly, the sides are straight, the posterior angles almost angular, finely punctate, the white setae sparse. The scutellum is long, pointed, and densely covered with white hairs. The elytra are punctate in rows, the intervals narrow, slightly raised, and brownish-spotted, especially at the suture. The scattered white setae are distinct, the marginal setae weak.
