= Somatoserica =

Scientific classification
- Kingdom: Animalia
- Phylum: Arthropoda
- Class: Insecta
- Order: Coleoptera
- Suborder: Polyphaga
- Infraorder: Scarabaeiformia
- Family: Scarabaeidae
- Subfamily: Sericinae
- Tribe: Sericini
- Genus: Somatoserica; Brenske, 1899
- Species: S. sikorae

Binomial name
- Somatoserica sikorae Brenske, 1899

Genus of beetles

Somatoserica is a genus of beetle of the family Scarabaeidae. It is monotypic, being represented by the single species, Somatoserica sikorae, which is found in Madagascar.

== Description ==
Adults reach a length of about 9 mm. They have an egg-shaped, cherry-brown, opalescent body, with the head somewhat darker. The clypeus is highly margined anteriorly and densely wrinkled-punctate. The frons is densely punctate, but not very finely. The pronotum is scarcely projecting anteriorly in the middle, the lateral margin, which runs obliquely backwards, forms a large arc at the hind angles, which merges into fine distinct lines at the posterior margin. The surface is densely and finely punctate and the lateral margin is strongly setose. The scutellum is large and narrowly heart-shaped. The elytra are densely punctate with a weakly raised suture and four narrow, smooth ribs extending to the apex. The lateral margin has distinct setate punctures.
