= Meriserica =

Scientific classification
- Kingdom: Animalia
- Phylum: Arthropoda
- Class: Insecta
- Order: Coleoptera
- Suborder: Polyphaga
- Infraorder: Scarabaeiformia
- Family: Scarabaeidae
- Subfamily: Sericinae
- Tribe: Sericini
- Genus: Meriserica; Brenske, 1897

Synonyms
- Mericserica (sic)

Genus of leaf beetles

Meriserica is a genus of beetles belonging to the family Scarabaeidae.

== Species ==
- Meriserica oberthuri Brenske, 1898
- Meriserica setosicollis (Frey, 1976)
