= Nematoserica =

Scientific classification
- Kingdom: Animalia
- Phylum: Arthropoda
- Class: Insecta
- Order: Coleoptera
- Suborder: Polyphaga
- Infraorder: Scarabaeiformia
- Family: Scarabaeidae
- Subfamily: Sericinae
- Tribe: Sericini
- Genus: Nematoserica; Arrow, 1917
- Species: N. coerulea

Binomial name
- Nematoserica coerulea Arrow, 1917

Genus of beetles

Nematoserica is a genus of beetle of the family Scarabaeidae. It is monotypic, being represented by the single species, Nematoserica coerulea, which is found in Malaysia (Sarawak).

== Description ==
Adults reach a length of about 5-5.5 mm. They are bright blue or greenish-blue. The upper surface is silky and sub-opaque, with the clypeus alone shining, the margin of the latter broadly reflexed. The elytra are sulcate and the sulci contain rather coarse but shallow punctures.
