= Parasymmela =

Scientific classification
- Kingdom: Animalia
- Phylum: Arthropoda
- Clade: Pancrustacea
- Class: Insecta
- Order: Coleoptera
- Suborder: Polyphaga
- Infraorder: Scarabaeiformia
- Family: Scarabaeidae
- Subfamily: Sericinae
- Tribe: Sericini
- Genus: Parasymmela; Pacheco, Monné, Vaz-de-Mello & Ahrens, 2022

Genus of leaf beetles

Parasymmela is a genus of beetles belonging to the family Scarabaeidae.

== Species ==
- Parasymmela amazonica Pacheco, Monné, Vaz-de-Mello & Ahrens, 2022
- Parasymmela howdeni Pacheco, Monné, Vaz-de-Mello & Ahrens, 2022
