= Miotemna =

Scientific classification
- Kingdom: Animalia
- Phylum: Arthropoda
- Class: Insecta
- Order: Coleoptera
- Suborder: Polyphaga
- Infraorder: Scarabaeiformia
- Family: Scarabaeidae
- Subfamily: Sericinae
- Tribe: Sericini
- Genus: Miotemna; Lacordaire, 1856
- Species: M. singularis

Binomial name
- Miotemna singularis (Blanchard, 1850)

Synonyms
- Octotemna Blanchard, 1850 (preocc.); Octotemna singularis Blanchard, 1850

Genus of beetles

Miotemna is a genus of beetle of the family Scarabaeidae. It is monotypic, being represented by the single species, Miotemna singularis, which is found in Bolivia.

== Taxonomy ==
Miotemna is the replacement name for Octotemna, due to homonymy with the Ciidae genus Octotemnus, described by Mellié in 1847.
