= Gryphonycha =

Scientific classification
- Kingdom: Animalia
- Phylum: Arthropoda
- Class: Insecta
- Order: Coleoptera
- Suborder: Polyphaga
- Infraorder: Scarabaeiformia
- Family: Scarabaeidae
- Subfamily: Sericinae
- Tribe: Sericini
- Genus: Gryphonycha; Péringuey, 1904
- Species: G. puberula

Binomial name
- Gryphonycha puberula (Fåhraeus, 1857)

Synonyms
- Serica puberula Fåhraeus, 1857

Genus of beetles

Gryphonycha is a genus of beetle of the family Scarabaeidae. It is monotypic, being represented by the single species, Gryphonycha puberula, which is found in South Africa (North West, Gauteng).

== Description ==
Adults reach a length of about 8–9 mm. They are rufescent, with a fleshy tinge and slightly iridescent. The elytra are punctato-striate, with the intervals raised and slightly tectiform, especially in the female, and moderately deeply punctate.
