= Parthenoserica =

Scientific classification
- Kingdom: Animalia
- Phylum: Arthropoda
- Clade: Pancrustacea
- Class: Insecta
- Order: Coleoptera
- Suborder: Polyphaga
- Infraorder: Scarabaeiformia
- Family: Scarabaeidae
- Subfamily: Sericinae
- Tribe: Sericini
- Genus: Parthenoserica; Brenske, 1899
- Species: P. sulcata

Binomial name
- Parthenoserica sulcata Brenske, 1900

Genus of beetles

Parthenoserica is a genus of beetle of the family Scarabaeidae. It is monotypic, being represented by the single species, Parthenoserica sulcata, which is found in Madagascar.

== Description ==
Adults reach a length of about 6 mm. They have an oval, brown body, with a greenish metallic sheen, especially on the head. The pronotum is more sparsely punctate in the middle than on the sides, weakly projecting anteriorly in the middle, the posterior angles scarcely rounded. The elongate, narrow scutellum is punctate at the base. The elytra are strongly ribbed, the ribs shiny, with two rather strong rows of punctures between each, and with a narrow transverse ridge before the apex. There are no setae on the surface, but there are very small marginal setae.
