= Psednoserica =

Scientific classification
- Kingdom: Animalia
- Phylum: Arthropoda
- Class: Insecta
- Order: Coleoptera
- Suborder: Polyphaga
- Infraorder: Scarabaeiformia
- Family: Scarabaeidae
- Subfamily: Sericinae
- Tribe: Sericini
- Genus: Psednoserica; Brenske, 1899
- Species: P. amoena

Binomial name
- Psednoserica amoena Brenske, 1900

Genus of beetles

Psednoserica is a genus of beetle of the family Scarabaeidae. It is monotypic, being represented by the single species, Psednoserica amoena, which is found in Madagascar.

== Description ==
Adults reach a length of about 3.8 mm. They have an narrow and delicate, dull, opalescent body, with a silky sheen. The elytra are somewhat redder than the head and pronotum, which are of an indeterminate brownish colour. The underside and legs are somewhat yellowish-brown.
