= Corynoserica =

Scientific classification
- Kingdom: Animalia
- Phylum: Arthropoda
- Clade: Pancrustacea
- Class: Insecta
- Order: Coleoptera
- Suborder: Polyphaga
- Infraorder: Scarabaeiformia
- Family: Scarabaeidae
- Subfamily: Sericinae
- Tribe: Sericini
- Genus: Corynoserica; Moser, 1918
- Species: C. tetraphylla

Binomial name
- Corynoserica tetraphylla Moser, 1918

Genus of beetles

Corynoserica is a genus of beetle of the family Scarabaeidae. It is monotypic, being represented by the single species, Corynoserica tetraphylla, which is found in Angola.

== Description ==
Adults reach a length of about 6 mm. They are yellowish-brown and shiny, with the head, pronotum and scutellum reddish-yellow. The head is moderately densely punctate and the antennae are yellowish-brown. The pronotum is quite densely and finely punctate and the elytra have rows of punctures, with the intervals moderately densely covered with punctures.
