= Pseudosericania =

Scientific classification
- Kingdom: Animalia
- Phylum: Arthropoda
- Class: Insecta
- Order: Coleoptera
- Suborder: Polyphaga
- Infraorder: Scarabaeiformia
- Family: Scarabaeidae
- Subfamily: Sericinae
- Tribe: Sericini
- Genus: Pseudosericania; Kobayashi, 1980

Genus of leaf beetles

Pseudosericania is a genus of beetles belonging to the family Scarabaeidae.

== Species ==
- Pseudosericania daxueshana Kobayashi, 2020
- Pseudosericania gibiventris Kobayashi, 1980
- Pseudosericania makiharai Hirasawa, 1991
- Pseudosericania nitididorsis (Nomura, 1974)
- Pseudosericania quadrifoliata (Nomura & Kobayashi, 1979)
