= Sphecoserica =

Scientific classification
- Kingdom: Animalia
- Phylum: Arthropoda
- Class: Insecta
- Order: Coleoptera
- Suborder: Polyphaga
- Infraorder: Scarabaeiformia
- Family: Scarabaeidae
- Subfamily: Sericinae
- Tribe: Sericini
- Genus: Sphecoserica; Brenske, 1899
- Species: S. gracilipennis

Binomial name
- Sphecoserica gracilipennis Brenske, 1899

Genus of beetles

Sphecoserica is a genus of beetle of the family Scarabaeidae. It is monotypic, being represented by the single species, Sphecoserica gracilipennis, which is found in Madagascar.

== Description ==
Adults reach a length of about 4.5 mm. They have an oblong, narrow, glossy brown head, pronotum, scutellum and thorax. The clypeus is densely punctate, slightly wrinkled and the frons is almost as strongly punctate. The pronotum is transverse, projecting forward in the middle at the front, scarcely wider towards the rear at the sides, the hind angles rounded, the surface densely punctate, the punctures as strong as on the frons, finely margined posteriorly. The elytra have nine fine ribs, with coarse punctures and rows of fine, whitish setae in the intervals.
