= Blebea elongata =

Scientific classification
- Kingdom: Animalia
- Phylum: Arthropoda
- Class: Insecta
- Order: Coleoptera
- Suborder: Polyphaga
- Infraorder: Scarabaeiformia
- Family: Scarabaeidae
- Subfamily: Sericinae
- Tribe: Sericini
- Genus: Blebea; Lacroix, 1994
- Species: B. elongata

Binomial name
- Blebea elongata Lacroix, 1994

Genus of beetles

Blebea is a genus of beetle of the family Scarabaeidae. It is monotypic, being represented by the single species, Blebea elongata, which is found on the Comores.

== Description ==
Adults reach a length of about 6 mm. They have a slightly elongated, oval body. The upper surface is dark brown. The clypeus are short, rounded at the sides, with a straight anterior margin and rather irregular punctation, identical to that of the frons. The pronotum has rather dense punctation. The elytra have pronounced striae and the interstriae are wide and punctate.
