= Tephraeoserica =

Scientific classification
- Kingdom: Animalia
- Phylum: Arthropoda
- Class: Insecta
- Order: Coleoptera
- Suborder: Polyphaga
- Infraorder: Scarabaeiformia
- Family: Scarabaeidae
- Subfamily: Sericinae
- Tribe: Sericini
- Genus: Tephraeoserica; Brenske, 1900
- Species: T. hauseri

Binomial name
- Tephraeoserica hauseri Brenske, 1901

Genus of beetles

Tephraeoserica is a genus of beetle of the family Scarabaeidae. It is monotypic, being represented by the single species, Tephraeoserica hauseri, which is found in Tanzania.

== Description ==
Adults reach a length of about 9 mm. They have a broadly ovate, dark brown body, with fine, appressed, whitish-grey pubescence. The frons is densely pubescent. The pronotum has very pointed anterior angles, right-angled posterior angles, and weakly rounded sides in the anterior part. The surface is convex, finely punctate, and densely pubescent. The elytra are depressed at the base and around the scutellum. Apart from the weakly raised suture, there are four distinct ribs, these are narrower than the spaces between them. The bare patches on them are shiny, with a slightly metallic sheen and the spaces between them are evenly and densely punctured, the punctures are slightly granular and covered with fine scale-like hairs. Along the lateral margin, next to it, and at the apex, there are individual longer bristle-like hairs.
