= Idaeserica =

Scientific classification
- Kingdom: Animalia
- Phylum: Arthropoda
- Class: Insecta
- Order: Coleoptera
- Suborder: Polyphaga
- Infraorder: Scarabaeiformia
- Family: Scarabaeidae
- Subfamily: Sericinae
- Tribe: Sericini
- Genus: Idaeserica; Péringuey, 1904
- Species: I. gratula

Binomial name
- Idaeserica gratula Péringuey, 1904

Genus of beetles

Idaeserica is a genus of beetle of the family Scarabaeidae. It is monotypic, being represented by the single species, Idaeserica gratula, which is found in Zimbabwe.

== Description ==
Adults reach a length of about 6.75–7 mm. They are pale testaceous, with the elytra lighter than the rest of the body. The club of the antennae is flavous.
