= Alogistotarsa ovampoana =

Scientific classification
- Kingdom: Animalia
- Phylum: Arthropoda
- Clade: Pancrustacea
- Class: Insecta
- Order: Coleoptera
- Suborder: Polyphaga
- Infraorder: Scarabaeiformia
- Family: Scarabaeidae
- Genus: Alogistotarsa
- Species: A. ovampoana

Binomial name
- Alogistotarsa ovampoana Péringuey, 1904

Species of beetle

Alogistotarsa ovampoana is a species of beetle of the family Scarabaeidae. It is found in Namibia.

== Description ==
Adults reach a length of about 6 mm. They are very similar to Alogistotarsa straminea, but are much more deeply punctured all over and there is no iridescence. Furthermore, they are testaceous instead of straw-coloured and the frontal part of the head is redder than the prothorax, but is not infuscate, and the striation on the elytra is deeper than in A. straminea.
