= Paramaladera =

Scientific classification
- Kingdom: Animalia
- Phylum: Arthropoda
- Clade: Pancrustacea
- Class: Insecta
- Order: Coleoptera
- Suborder: Polyphaga
- Infraorder: Scarabaeiformia
- Family: Scarabaeidae
- Subfamily: Sericinae
- Tribe: Sericini
- Genus: Paramaladera; Nomura, 1974

Genus of leaf beetles

Paramaladera is a genus of beetles belonging to the family Scarabaeidae.

== Species ==
- Paramaladera aserrata Nomura & Kobayashi, 1979
- Paramaladera kiyoyamai Nomura, 1974
- Paramaladera major Nomura, 1974
- Paramaladera makiharai Nomura, 1974
- Paramaladera masumotoi Hirasawa, 1991
- Paramaladera pishana Kobayashi, 1991
- Paramaladera rufofusca Nomura, 1974
- Paramaladera simillima Kobayashi, 1985
