= Teraserica =

Scientific classification
- Kingdom: Animalia
- Phylum: Arthropoda
- Class: Insecta
- Order: Coleoptera
- Suborder: Polyphaga
- Infraorder: Scarabaeiformia
- Family: Scarabaeidae
- Subfamily: Sericinae
- Tribe: Sericini
- Genus: Teraserica; Brenske, 1898
- Species: T. timorana

Binomial name
- Teraserica timorana Brenske, 1899

Genus of beetles

Teraserica is a genus of beetle of the family Scarabaeidae. It is monotypic, being represented by the single species, Teraserica timorana, which is found in Indonesia (Timor).

== Description ==
Adults reach a length of about 4.5 mm. They have a narrow, glossy brown body. The large eyes are black. The narrow clypeus is somewhat depressed and dully punctate and the narrow frons is flat and dully punctate. The pronotum is only slightly convex, finely and densely punctate, not projecting forward in the middle of the anterior margin, the anterior angles only slightly projecting, the sides straight and not widening posteriorly. The scutellum is narrow and pointed. The elytra are densely and rather coarsely punctate in the striae, the intervals are weakly raised, punctate, flattened towards the apex. The pygidium is broad.
