= Chrysoserica =

Scientific classification
- Kingdom: Animalia
- Phylum: Arthropoda
- Clade: Pancrustacea
- Class: Insecta
- Order: Coleoptera
- Suborder: Polyphaga
- Infraorder: Scarabaeiformia
- Family: Scarabaeidae
- Subfamily: Sericinae
- Tribe: Sericini
- Genus: Chrysoserica; Brenske, 1897

Genus of leaf beetles

Chrysoserica is a genus of beetles belonging to the family Scarabaeidae.

== Species ==
- Chrysoserica angoris Ahrens, 2001
- Chrysoserica auricoma Brenske, 1896
- Chrysoserica gigantea Brenske, 1898
- Chrysoserica stebnickae Ahrens, 2001
