= Stilbotrochalus =

Scientific classification
- Kingdom: Animalia
- Phylum: Arthropoda
- Clade: Pancrustacea
- Class: Insecta
- Order: Coleoptera
- Suborder: Polyphaga
- Infraorder: Scarabaeiformia
- Family: Scarabaeidae
- Subfamily: Sericinae
- Tribe: Sericini
- Genus: Stilbotrochalus; Kolbe, 1914
- Species: S. nitens

Binomial name
- Stilbotrochalus nitens Kolbe, 1914

Genus of beetles

Stilbotrochalus is a genus of beetle of the family Scarabaeidae. It is monotypic, being represented by the single species, Stilbotrochalus nitens, which is found in Tanzania.

== Description ==
Adults reach a length of about 6.75 mm (0.266 in). They are entirely brownish-red, strongly glossy, and neither tomentose nor hairy. The pronotum is strongly narrowed anteriorly, superiorly almost densely punctate. The elytra are punctate-striate, with the striae somewhat impressed and the interstriae sparsely punctate. The pygidium is weakly convex, partly slightly, but very faintly, foveolate and sparsely, but rather strongly punctate.
