= Hetamius =

Scientific classification
- Kingdom: Animalia
- Phylum: Arthropoda
- Clade: Pancrustacea
- Class: Insecta
- Order: Coleoptera
- Suborder: Polyphaga
- Infraorder: Scarabaeiformia
- Family: Scarabaeidae
- Subfamily: Sericinae
- Tribe: Sericini
- Genus: Hetamius; Fairmaire, 1893
- Species: H. demaisoni

Binomial name
- Hetamius demaisoni Fairmaire, 1893

Genus of beetles

Hetamius is a genus of beetle of the family Scarabaeidae. It is monotypic, being represented by the single species, Hetamius demaisoni, which is found in Algeria and Egypt.

== Description ==
Adults reach a length of about 6 mm (0.24 in). The clypeus is yellowish-brown, the frons black and the pronotum and elytra dark brown, but lightened on the sides. They have yellow hairs.
