= Lamproserica =

Scientific classification
- Kingdom: Animalia
- Phylum: Arthropoda
- Class: Insecta
- Order: Coleoptera
- Suborder: Polyphaga
- Infraorder: Scarabaeiformia
- Family: Scarabaeidae
- Subfamily: Sericinae
- Tribe: Sericini
- Genus: Lamproserica; Brenske, 1898

Genus of leaf beetles

Lamproserica is a genus of beetles belonging to the family Scarabaeidae.

== Species ==
- Lamproserica beccarii Brenske, 1902
- Lamproserica kakomae Brenske, 1902
- Lamproserica manyara Frey, 1962
- Lamproserica mombasana Brenske, 1902
- Lamproserica salaama Brenske, 1902
