= Campylotrochalus =

Scientific classification
- Kingdom: Animalia
- Phylum: Arthropoda
- Clade: Pancrustacea
- Class: Insecta
- Order: Coleoptera
- Suborder: Polyphaga
- Infraorder: Scarabaeiformia
- Family: Scarabaeidae
- Subfamily: Sericinae
- Tribe: Sericini
- Genus: Campylotrochalus; Brenske, 1900
- Species: C. glabriclypealis

Binomial name
- Campylotrochalus glabriclypealis Brenske, 1902

Synonyms
- Campylotrochalus glabroclypealis vittatus Frey, 1960

Genus of beetles

Campylotrochalus is a genus of beetle of the family Scarabaeidae. It is monotypic, being represented by the single species, Campylotrochalus glabriclypealis, which is found in Togo.

== Description ==
Adults reach a length of about 6 mm. They have a dark greenish, strongly tomentose and silky-glossy body. Only the anterior half of the body and the legs are shiny. Up to half its length, the body is smooth, entirely without punctures, a row of strong setae delineates this part. From this row to the frontal suture, the body is very densely finely wrinkled. The pronotum is very finely punctured. The finely punctured elytra are so densely tomentose that the rows of punctures are not recognizable.
