= Nepaloserica pewaensis =

Scientific classification
- Kingdom: Animalia
- Phylum: Arthropoda
- Class: Insecta
- Order: Coleoptera
- Suborder: Polyphaga
- Infraorder: Scarabaeiformia
- Family: Scarabaeidae
- Genus: Nepaloserica
- Species: N. pewaensis

Binomial name
- Nepaloserica pewaensis Ahrens, 2012

Species of beetle

Nepaloserica pewaensis is a species of beetle of the family Scarabaeidae. It is found in Nepal.

== Description ==
Adults reach a length of about 11.2 mm. Adults are very similar to Nepaloserica baglungensis, but the body is reddish-brown and the body is glabrous, except for the sparsely setose frons.

== Etymology ==
The species is named after its type locality, Pewa.
