= Ovoserica =

Scientific classification
- Kingdom: Animalia
- Phylum: Arthropoda
- Class: Insecta
- Order: Coleoptera
- Suborder: Polyphaga
- Infraorder: Scarabaeiformia
- Family: Scarabaeidae
- Subfamily: Sericinae
- Tribe: Sericini
- Genus: Ovoserica; Frey, 1968
- Species: O. testaceipennis

Binomial name
- Ovoserica testaceipennis Frey, 1968

Genus of beetles

Ovoserica is a genus of beetle of the family Scarabaeidae. It is monotypic, being represented by the single species, Ovoserica testaceipennis, which is found in Madagascar.

== Description ==
Adults reach a length of about 7 mm. The head and pronotum are dark brown, with the head weakly glossy and the pronotum dull. The clypeus is covered with yellow setae, while the frons and vertex are glabrous. The pronotum is fringed with long, pale setae. Elsewhere, the body is covered with thin, erect setae, somewhat scattered but fairly evenly. The elytra are glabrous on the disc, but covered with pale, erect, spiny setae at the margin. The elytral margin is fringed with broad, scale-like setae.
