= Manoserica =

Scientific classification
- Kingdom: Animalia
- Phylum: Arthropoda
- Clade: Pancrustacea
- Class: Insecta
- Order: Coleoptera
- Suborder: Polyphaga
- Infraorder: Scarabaeiformia
- Family: Scarabaeidae
- Subfamily: Sericinae
- Tribe: Sericini
- Genus: Manoserica; Moser, 1924
- Species: M. disparicornis

Binomial name
- Manoserica disparicornis (Quedenfeldt, 1888)

Synonyms
- Serica disparicornis Quedenfeldt, 1888

Genus of beetles

Manoserica is a genus of beetle of the family Scarabaeidae. It is monotypic, being represented by the single species, Manoserica disparicornis, which is found in the Democratic Republic of the Congo.

== Description ==
Adults reach a length of about 5.5 mm. They have an elongate body, without pubescence or scales, and more glossy underneath than above. They are uniformly reddish-yellow. The frons has fine punctation. The pronotum is fairly densely and finely, evenly punctate, only slightly narrowed anteriorly, parallel-sided posteriorly, scarcely indented, with right-angled corners. The scutellum is large, oblong-triangular, the apex slightly rounded, the mandibles weakly upturned, finely punctate on the inside. The elytra are weakly furrowed, finely punctate both in the furrows and on the weakly convex intervals. The underside and legs are widely punctate.
