= Ahrenserica =

Scientific classification
- Kingdom: Animalia
- Phylum: Arthropoda
- Class: Insecta
- Order: Coleoptera
- Suborder: Polyphaga
- Infraorder: Scarabaeiformia
- Family: Scarabaeidae
- Subfamily: Sericinae
- Tribe: Sericini
- Genus: Ahrenserica; Allsopp & Schoolmeesters, 2024
- Species: A. fulvastra

Binomial name
- Ahrenserica fulvastra (Brenske, 1902)

Synonyms
- Orthoserica Brenske, 1900 (preocc.); Orthoserica fulvastra Brenske, 1902

Genus of beetles

Ahrenserica is a genus of beetle of the family Scarabaeidae. It is monotypic, being represented by the single species, Ahrenserica fulvastra, which is found in Mali.

== Description ==
Adults reach a length of about 6 mm. They are reddish-yellow, dull, densely tomentose and slightly opalescent. The antennae are shiny yellow.
