= Rhynchoserica =

Scientific classification
- Kingdom: Animalia
- Phylum: Arthropoda
- Class: Insecta
- Order: Coleoptera
- Suborder: Polyphaga
- Infraorder: Scarabaeiformia
- Family: Scarabaeidae
- Subfamily: Sericinae
- Tribe: Sericini
- Genus: Rhynchoserica; Burgeon, 1942

Genus of leaf beetles

Rhynchoserica is a genus of beetles belonging to the family Scarabaeidae.

== Species ==
- Rhynchoserica clypeata Frey, 1968
- Rhynchoserica rostrata Burgeon, 1942
