= Gastromaladera =

Scientific classification
- Kingdom: Animalia
- Phylum: Arthropoda
- Class: Insecta
- Order: Coleoptera
- Suborder: Polyphaga
- Infraorder: Scarabaeiformia
- Family: Scarabaeidae
- Subfamily: Sericinae
- Tribe: Sericini
- Genus: Gastromaladera; Nomura, 1973

Genus of leaf beetles

Gastromaladera is a genus of beetles belonging to the family Scarabaeidae.

== Species ==
- Gastromaladera koyamai Hirasawa, 1985
- Gastromaladera major (Nomura, 1959)
- Gastromaladera nitida Nomura, 1974
- Gastromaladera taitungensis Kobayashi, 1991
