= Conioserica =

Scientific classification
- Kingdom: Animalia
- Phylum: Arthropoda
- Clade: Pancrustacea
- Class: Insecta
- Order: Coleoptera
- Suborder: Polyphaga
- Infraorder: Scarabaeiformia
- Family: Scarabaeidae
- Subfamily: Sericinae
- Tribe: Sericini
- Genus: Conioserica; Brenske, 1900

Genus of leaf beetles

Conioserica is a genus of beetles belonging to the family Scarabaeidae.

== Species ==
- Conioserica eisermanni Brenske, 1901
- Conioserica guineensis Frey, 1960
