= Deroserica =

Scientific classification
- Kingdom: Animalia
- Phylum: Arthropoda
- Clade: Pancrustacea
- Class: Insecta
- Order: Coleoptera
- Suborder: Polyphaga
- Infraorder: Scarabaeiformia
- Family: Scarabaeidae
- Subfamily: Sericinae
- Tribe: Sericini
- Genus: Deroserica; Moser, 1915

Genus of leaf beetles

Deroserica is a genus of beetles belonging to the family Scarabaeidae.

== Species ==
- Deroserica championi Ahrens & Fabrizi, 2016
- Deroserica compressicrus Moser, 1915
- Deroserica koelleri Ahrens & Fabrizi, 2016
- Deroserica kulzeri (Frey, 1976)
- Deroserica pulchra Moser, 1915
