= Nedymoserica =

Scientific classification
- Kingdom: Animalia
- Phylum: Arthropoda
- Class: Insecta
- Order: Coleoptera
- Suborder: Polyphaga
- Infraorder: Scarabaeiformia
- Family: Scarabaeidae
- Subfamily: Sericinae
- Tribe: Sericini
- Genus: Nedymoserica; Brenske, 1900
- Species: N. flavida

Binomial name
- Nedymoserica flavida Brenske, 1902

Genus of beetles

Nedymoserica is a genus of beetle of the family Scarabaeidae. It is monotypic, being represented by the single species, Nedymoserica flavida, which is found in Mozambique.

== Description ==
Adults reach a length of about 6.5 mm. They have a pale golden-yellow, brightly opaline, opaque body. The elytra are finely serially punctate in the deepened striae and irregularly punctate alongside of them, the narrow intervals weakly punctate, the setigerous punctures are very distinct, the sides have densely set, upright marginal setae.
