= Clypeoserica =

Scientific classification
- Kingdom: Animalia
- Phylum: Arthropoda
- Clade: Pancrustacea
- Class: Insecta
- Order: Coleoptera
- Suborder: Polyphaga
- Infraorder: Scarabaeiformia
- Family: Scarabaeidae
- Subfamily: Sericinae
- Tribe: Sericini
- Genus: Clypeoserica; Frey, 1970
- Species: C. producta

Binomial name
- Clypeoserica producta Frey, 1970

Genus of beetles

Clypeoserica is a genus of beetle of the family Scarabaeidae. It is monotypic, being represented by the single species, Clypeoserica producta, which is found in Sudan.

== Description ==
Adults reach a length of about 7 mm. The upper and lower surfaces are reddish-yellow, glossy and glabrous except for a few hairs at the apex of the pygidium. The head and pronotum are densely and rather finely punctate. The elytra and scutellum are punctate, the elytra with punctate striae, and with the intervals flat.
