= Loboserica kivuana =

Scientific classification
- Kingdom: Animalia
- Phylum: Arthropoda
- Clade: Pancrustacea
- Class: Insecta
- Order: Coleoptera
- Suborder: Polyphaga
- Infraorder: Scarabaeiformia
- Family: Scarabaeidae
- Genus: Loboserica
- Species: L. kivuana

Binomial name
- Loboserica kivuana Kolbe, 1914

Species of beetle

Loboserica kivuana is a species of beetle of the family Scarabaeidae. It is found in Rwanda and Burundi.

== Description ==
Adults reach a length of about 6.75 mm (0.266 in). They are similar to Loboserica gracilis, but slightly less slender, more convex, somewhat thicker at the rear, and also shinier. The clypeus is emarginate in the middle at the front (not simply truncated). The pronotum has a rounded impression before the anterior corners, and is somewhat more strongly punctate on the upper surface. The elytra are less narrow and distinctly convex. The pygidium is less densely punctate, glossy and convex.
