= Aphenoserica =

Scientific classification
- Kingdom: Animalia
- Phylum: Arthropoda
- Clade: Pancrustacea
- Class: Insecta
- Order: Coleoptera
- Suborder: Polyphaga
- Infraorder: Scarabaeiformia
- Family: Scarabaeidae
- Subfamily: Sericinae
- Tribe: Sericini
- Genus: Aphenoserica; Brenske, 1900

Synonyms
- Aphaenoserica

Genus of leaf beetles

Aphenoserica is a genus of beetles belonging to the family Scarabaeidae.

== Species ==
- Aphenoserica fallax Brenske, 1901
- Aphenoserica insularis (Moser, 1913)
