= Sayloria =

Scientific classification
- Kingdom: Animalia
- Phylum: Arthropoda
- Clade: Pancrustacea
- Class: Insecta
- Order: Coleoptera
- Suborder: Polyphaga
- Infraorder: Scarabaeiformia
- Family: Scarabaeidae
- Subfamily: Sericinae
- Tribe: Sericini
- Genus: Sayloria; Frey, 1975

Genus of leaf beetles

Sayloria is a genus of beetles belonging to the family Scarabaeidae.

== Species ==
- Sayloria abcora (Saylor, 1946)
- Sayloria bicoloripes (Saylor, 1946)
- Sayloria pottsi (Saylor, 1946)
