= Nepaloserica =

Scientific classification
- Kingdom: Animalia
- Phylum: Arthropoda
- Class: Insecta
- Order: Coleoptera
- Suborder: Polyphaga
- Infraorder: Scarabaeiformia
- Family: Scarabaeidae
- Subfamily: Sericinae
- Tribe: Sericini
- Genus: Nepaloserica; Frey, 1965

Genus of leaf beetles

Nepaloserica is a genus of beetles belonging to the family Scarabaeidae.

== Species ==
- Nepaloserica archolabrata Ahrens & Sabatinelli, 1996
- Nepaloserica baehri Ahrens & Sabatinelli, 1996
- Nepaloserica baglungensis Ahrens, 2012
- Nepaloserica barbara Ahrens & Sabatinelli, 1996
- Nepaloserica brevipes Ahrens & Sabatinelli, 1996
- Nepaloserica bruschii Ahrens & Sabatinelli, 1996
- Nepaloserica cheemaensis Bhunia, Gupta, Chandra & Ahrens, 2021
- Nepaloserica fabriziae Ahrens, 1999
- Nepaloserica ganeshi Ahrens, 1999
- Nepaloserica goomensis Ahrens, 1999
- Nepaloserica hartmanni Ahrens, 1999
- Nepaloserica helambuensis Ahrens & Sabatinelli, 1996
- Nepaloserica induwae Ahrens, 1999
- Nepaloserica jumlaica Ahrens, 1999
- Nepaloserica lamjungi Ahrens, 1999
- Nepaloserica longispina Ahrens, 1999
- Nepaloserica manasluensis Ahrens, 2004
- Nepaloserica migliaccioi Ahrens & Sabatinelli, 1996
- Nepaloserica muelleri Ahrens & Sabatinelli, 1996
- Nepaloserica mustangia Ahrens & Sabatinelli, 1996
- Nepaloserica nielamuensis Liu & Ahrens, 2014
- Nepaloserica perrecondita Ahrens, 2004
- Nepaloserica pewaensis Ahrens, 2012
- Nepaloserica phulcokiensis Ahrens & Sabatinelli, 1996
- Nepaloserica procera Frey, 1965
- Nepaloserica richardsonae Ahrens, 2012
- Nepaloserica rufobrunnea Ahrens, 1999
- Nepaloserica sankhuwasabhae Ahrens & Sabatinelli, 1996
- Nepaloserica schmidti Ahrens & Sabatinelli, 1996
- Nepaloserica similis Frey, 1969
- Nepaloserica telbrungensis Ahrens, 1999
- Nepaloserica thimphui Ahrens & Sabatinelli, 1996
- Nepaloserica vignai Ahrens & Sabatinelli, 1996
- Nepaloserica vilya Ahrens & Sabatinelli, 1996
- Nepaloserica yeti Ahrens, 1999
