= Nepaloserica richardsonae =

Scientific classification
- Kingdom: Animalia
- Phylum: Arthropoda
- Class: Insecta
- Order: Coleoptera
- Suborder: Polyphaga
- Infraorder: Scarabaeiformia
- Family: Scarabaeidae
- Genus: Nepaloserica
- Species: N. richardsonae

Binomial name
- Nepaloserica richardsonae Ahrens, 2012

Species of beetle

Nepaloserica richardsonae is a species of beetle of the family Scarabaeidae. It is found in Nepal.

== Description ==
Adults reach a length of about 12.2–13.3 mm. Adults are very similar to Nepaloserica baglungensis, but the dorsal surface, including the head and pronotum are nearly glabrous.

== Etymology ==
The species is named after Miranda Richardson.
