= Plaesioserica =

Scientific classification
- Kingdom: Animalia
- Phylum: Arthropoda
- Class: Insecta
- Order: Coleoptera
- Suborder: Polyphaga
- Infraorder: Scarabaeiformia
- Family: Scarabaeidae
- Subfamily: Sericinae
- Tribe: Sericini
- Genus: Plaesioserica; Brenske, 1899
- Species: P. viridula

Binomial name
- Plaesioserica viridula Brenske, 1900

Genus of beetles

Plaesioserica is a genus of beetle of the family Scarabaeidae. It is monotypic, being represented by the single species, Plaesioserica viridula, which is found in Madagascar.

== Description ==
Adults reach a length of about 5.4 mm. They have a short oval, almost narrow, slightly convex, glossy green, finely punctate body. The frons is finely punctate, and the eyes are strongly protruding. The pronotum is almost straight at the sides, distinctly projecting in the middle at the anterior margin, the posterior angles are finely rounded, the surface is finely punctate. The elytra are finely punctate in double rows, the punctures are somewhat stronger than on the pronotum, interspersed with individual, very indistinct setae and with very fine, narrowly raised ribs, smooth at the apex, the sparsely setate lateral margin becomes abruptly very narrow from the apex of the episterna.
