= Philoserica =

Scientific classification
- Kingdom: Animalia
- Phylum: Arthropoda
- Clade: Pancrustacea
- Class: Insecta
- Order: Coleoptera
- Suborder: Polyphaga
- Infraorder: Scarabaeiformia
- Family: Scarabaeidae
- Subfamily: Sericinae
- Tribe: Sericini
- Genus: Philoserica; Brenske, 1898
- Species: P. vittata

Binomial name
- Philoserica vittata (Blanchard, 1850)

Synonyms
- Omaloplia (Brachyphylla) vittata Blanchard, 1850; Homaloplia pauper Wallengren, 1881

Genus of beetles

Philoserica is a genus of beetle of the family Scarabaeidae. It is monotypic, being represented by the single species, Philoserica vittata, which is found in South Africa (Mpumalanga, Gauteng, North West, KwaZulu-Natal, Amazulu, Gariep) and Zimbabwe.

== Description ==
Adults reach a length of about 6.5-7.5 mm. They are black, with the head and prothorax sub-opaque, and yet very faintly iridescent. The scutellum is black and the elytra are strongly iridescent, pale testaceous, with the suture, the outer margin, and three stripes on each side black. The pedicel of the antennae is reddish, while the club is black. The colour of the elytra varies much, the black stripes and outer margins disappear occasionally, or the black tinge has invaded the whole surface which is then very iridescent.
