= Plusioserica =

Scientific classification
- Kingdom: Animalia
- Phylum: Arthropoda
- Class: Insecta
- Order: Coleoptera
- Suborder: Polyphaga
- Infraorder: Scarabaeiformia
- Family: Scarabaeidae
- Subfamily: Sericinae
- Tribe: Sericini
- Genus: Plusioserica; Brenske, 1899
- Species: P. virescens

Binomial name
- Plusioserica virescens (Künckel d'Herculais, 1887)

Synonyms
- Omaloplia virescens Künckel d'Herculais, 1887

Genus of beetles

Plusioserica is a genus of beetle of the family Scarabaeidae. It is monotypic, being represented by the single species, Plusioserica virescens, which is found in Madagascar.

== Description ==
Adults reach a length of about 7 mm. They have an ovate, not very wide, convex, strongly glossy green body. The surface of the pronotum is finely punctate without setae, but there are some weak setae on the finely margined sides, and the fine line of the posterior margin is indistinct in the middle. The elytra are glossy, smooth, very finely punctate in narrow rows, without any indication of ribs, but with a few scattered, distinct setate punctures.
