= Loboserica =

Scientific classification
- Kingdom: Animalia
- Phylum: Arthropoda
- Clade: Pancrustacea
- Class: Insecta
- Order: Coleoptera
- Suborder: Polyphaga
- Infraorder: Scarabaeiformia
- Family: Scarabaeidae
- Subfamily: Sericinae
- Tribe: Sericini
- Genus: Loboserica; Kolbe, 1914

Genus of leaf beetles

Loboserica is a genus of beetles belonging to the family Scarabaeidae.

== Species ==
- Loboserica gracilis Kolbe, 1914
- Loboserica kivuana Kolbe, 1914
