= Dolerotarsa =

Scientific classification
- Kingdom: Animalia
- Phylum: Arthropoda
- Clade: Pancrustacea
- Class: Insecta
- Order: Coleoptera
- Suborder: Polyphaga
- Infraorder: Scarabaeiformia
- Family: Scarabaeidae
- Subfamily: Sericinae
- Tribe: Sericini
- Genus: Dolerotarsa; Péringuey, 1904
- Species: D. emendatrix

Binomial name
- Dolerotarsa emendatrix Péringuey, 1904

Genus of beetles

Dolerotarsa is a genus of beetle of the family Scarabaeidae. It is monotypic, being represented by the single species, Dolerotarsa emendatrix, which is found in South Africa (Mpumalanga).

== Description ==
Adults reach a length of about 5-5.5 mm. They are testaceous-red, with the elytra testaceous yellow and the antennae flavous. The head is deeply and slightly roughly punctate from the apex of the clypeus to the basal part. The elytra are plainly striate with the intervals raised and tectiform in the dorsal part, very numerously punctate, glabrous.
