= Emphania =

Scientific classification
- Kingdom: Animalia
- Phylum: Arthropoda
- Clade: Pancrustacea
- Class: Insecta
- Order: Coleoptera
- Suborder: Polyphaga
- Infraorder: Scarabaeiformia
- Family: Scarabaeidae
- Subfamily: Sericinae
- Tribe: Sericini
- Genus: Emphania; Erichson, 1847

Synonyms
- Heptomera Blanchard, 1850

Genus of leaf beetles

Emphania is a genus of beetles belonging to the family Scarabaeidae.

== Species ==
- Emphania erichsoni Ahrens & Fabrizi, 2008
- Emphania lacroixi Ahrens & Fabrizi, 2008
- Emphania metallica (Blanchard, 1850)
- Emphania nitida Moser, 1911
- Emphania ranomafanae Ahrens & Fabrizi, 2008
- Emphania semiviridis Ahrens & Fabrizi, 2008
- Emphania subsmaragdina Ahrens & Fabrizi, 2008
- Emphania sulcipennis Moser, 1911
