= Hellaserica =

Scientific classification
- Kingdom: Animalia
- Phylum: Arthropoda
- Class: Insecta
- Order: Coleoptera
- Suborder: Polyphaga
- Infraorder: Scarabaeiformia
- Family: Scarabaeidae
- Subfamily: Sericinae
- Tribe: Sericini
- Genus: Hellaserica; Baraud & Nicolas, 1966
- Species: H. elongata

Binomial name
- Hellaserica elongata (Reitter, 1887)

Synonyms
- Homaloplia elongata Reitter, 1887; Hellaserica elongata brunnea Petrovitz, 1971; Hellaserica elongata nigra Petrovitz, 1971

Genus of beetles

Hellaserica is a genus of beetle of the family Scarabaeidae. It is monotypic, being represented by the single species, Hellaserica elongata, which is found in Greece.

== Description ==
Adults reach a length of about 10 mm. They are black with yellowish-brown elytra and yellow hairs. The head is black and shiny.
