= Leoserica =

Scientific classification
- Kingdom: Animalia
- Phylum: Arthropoda
- Clade: Pancrustacea
- Class: Insecta
- Order: Coleoptera
- Suborder: Polyphaga
- Infraorder: Scarabaeiformia
- Family: Scarabaeidae
- Subfamily: Sericinae
- Tribe: Sericini
- Genus: Leoserica; Fabrizi, Eberle & Ahrens, 2019

Genus of leaf beetles

Leoserica is a genus of beetles belonging to the family Scarabaeidae.

== Species ==
- Leoserica capensis (Brenske, 1902)
- Leoserica hotovyi Fabrizi, Eberle & Ahrens, 2019
- Leoserica jamesi Fabrizi, Eberle & Ahrens, 2019
- Leoserica knysnana Fabrizi, Eberle & Ahrens, 2019
