= Cyphoserica =

Scientific classification
- Kingdom: Animalia
- Phylum: Arthropoda
- Class: Insecta
- Order: Coleoptera
- Suborder: Polyphaga
- Infraorder: Scarabaeiformia
- Family: Scarabaeidae
- Subfamily: Sericinae
- Tribe: Sericini
- Genus: Cyphoserica; Brenske, 1900
- Species: C. mukengeana

Binomial name
- Cyphoserica mukengeana Brenske, 1900

Genus of beetles

Cyphoserica is a genus of beetle of the family Scarabaeidae. It is monotypic, being represented by the single species, Cyphoserica mukengeana, which is found in Zambia.

== Description ==
Adults reach a length of about 7 mm. They are greenish and opalescent, and scaled above and especially below. There are narrow, smooth ribs on the elytra. The frons is distinctly flattened, with a faint longitudinal line and fine white scale-like hairs in the middle, with narrow eye-rings, vividly greenish. The pronotum is sparsely scaled, projecting forward in the middle anteriorly, the sides parallel, with very few and very fine scales in the middle, more densely and distinctly scaled on the sides. The scutellum is elongate and covered with fine scale-like hairs. the midline is smooth. The elytra are densely covered in the deep striae. The ribs are narrow, strongly raised, bright red or darker opalescent. The junction of the ribs before the apex forms a smooth spot.
