= Charioserica =

Scientific classification
- Kingdom: Animalia
- Phylum: Arthropoda
- Clade: Pancrustacea
- Class: Insecta
- Order: Coleoptera
- Suborder: Polyphaga
- Infraorder: Scarabaeiformia
- Family: Scarabaeidae
- Subfamily: Sericinae
- Tribe: Sericini
- Genus: Charioserica; Brenske, 1899
- Species: C. striata

Binomial name
- Charioserica striata Brenske, 1900

Genus of beetles

Charioserica is a genus of beetle of the family Scarabaeidae. It is monotypic, being represented by the single species, Charioserica striata, which is found in Madagascar.

== Description ==
Adults reach a length of about 4 mm. They have an oblong, narrow, delicate, dull, silky-glossy body. They are yellow above with dark striped elytra and dark below. The head is metallic green and the pronotum has greenish, indistinct markings.
