= Eriphoserica =

Scientific classification
- Kingdom: Animalia
- Phylum: Arthropoda
- Class: Insecta
- Order: Coleoptera
- Suborder: Polyphaga
- Infraorder: Scarabaeiformia
- Family: Scarabaeidae
- Subfamily: Sericinae
- Tribe: Sericini
- Genus: Eriphoserica; Brenske, 1899
- Species: E. camentoides

Binomial name
- Eriphoserica camentoides Brenske, 1900

Genus of beetles

Eriphoserica is a genus of beetle of the family Scarabaeidae. It is monotypic, being represented by the single species, Eriphoserica camentoides, which is found in Madagascar.

== Description ==
Adults reach a length of about 5-6 mm. They have an ovate, glossy yellowish-brown body, with a somewhat reddish head and pronotum. The broad frons is densely and wrinkledly punctate along the suture, becoming more finely punctate posteriorly until it reaches the smooth, strongly convex vertex. The pronotum is finely punctate, weakly projecting anteriorly in the middle. The hairs on the margin are sparse, but the recurved margin is covered with long setae. The short scutellum is densely punctate. The elytra are densely and finely punctate, somewhat more strongly than the pronotum.
