= Nepaloserica jumlaica =

Scientific classification
- Kingdom: Animalia
- Phylum: Arthropoda
- Class: Insecta
- Order: Coleoptera
- Suborder: Polyphaga
- Infraorder: Scarabaeiformia
- Family: Scarabaeidae
- Genus: Nepaloserica
- Species: N. jumlaica

Binomial name
- Nepaloserica jumlaica Ahrens, 1999

Species of beetle

Nepaloserica jumlaica is a species of beetle of the family Scarabaeidae. It is found in Nepal.

== Description ==
Adults reach a length of about 11.25 mm. They have a chestnut brown, oblong body. The dorsal surface is glabrous.
