= Nepaloserica similis =

Scientific classification
- Kingdom: Animalia
- Phylum: Arthropoda
- Class: Insecta
- Order: Coleoptera
- Suborder: Polyphaga
- Infraorder: Scarabaeiformia
- Family: Scarabaeidae
- Genus: Nepaloserica
- Species: N. similis

Binomial name
- Nepaloserica similis Frey, 1969

Species of beetle

Nepaloserica similis is a species of beetle of the family Scarabaeidae. It is found in Nepal.

== Description ==
Adults reach a length of about 10 mm. They are brown and covered with light hairs. The clypeus is somewhat darker and shiny and the pronotum and head are scarcely lighter than the elytra.
