= Nepaloserica thimphui =

Scientific classification
- Kingdom: Animalia
- Phylum: Arthropoda
- Class: Insecta
- Order: Coleoptera
- Suborder: Polyphaga
- Infraorder: Scarabaeiformia
- Family: Scarabaeidae
- Genus: Nepaloserica
- Species: N. thimphui

Binomial name
- Nepaloserica thimphui Ahrens & Sabatinelli, 1996

Species of beetle

Nepaloserica thimphui is a species of beetle of the family Scarabaeidae. It is found in Bhutan.

== Description ==
Adults reach a length of about 8.9 mm. They are uniform yellowish-brown.
