= Leoserica jamesi =

Scientific classification
- Kingdom: Animalia
- Phylum: Arthropoda
- Clade: Pancrustacea
- Class: Insecta
- Order: Coleoptera
- Suborder: Polyphaga
- Infraorder: Scarabaeiformia
- Family: Scarabaeidae
- Genus: Leoserica
- Species: L. jamesi

Binomial name
- Leoserica jamesi Fabrizi, Eberle & Ahrens, 2019

Species of beetle

Leoserica jamesi is a species of beetle of the family Scarabaeidae. It is found in South Africa (Western Cape).

== Description ==
Adults reach a length of about 10.85 mm.

== Etymology ==
The species is named after its collector, James du G. Harrison.
