= Emphania semiviridis =

Scientific classification
- Kingdom: Animalia
- Phylum: Arthropoda
- Class: Insecta
- Order: Coleoptera
- Suborder: Polyphaga
- Infraorder: Scarabaeiformia
- Family: Scarabaeidae
- Genus: Emphania
- Species: E. semiviridis

Binomial name
- Emphania semiviridis Ahrens & Fabrizi, 2008

Species of beetle

Emphania semiviridis is a species of beetle of the family Scarabaeidae. It is found in Madagascar.

== Description ==
Adults reach a length of about 6.5 mm. The dorsal body surface is dark green with a greenish shine, partly reddish.

== Etymology ==
The species name is derived from Latin semi (meaning half) and viridis (meaning green).
