= Nepaloserica bruschii =

Scientific classification
- Kingdom: Animalia
- Phylum: Arthropoda
- Class: Insecta
- Order: Coleoptera
- Suborder: Polyphaga
- Infraorder: Scarabaeiformia
- Family: Scarabaeidae
- Genus: Nepaloserica
- Species: N. bruschii

Binomial name
- Nepaloserica bruschii Ahrens & Sabatinelli, 1996

Species of beetle

Nepaloserica bruschii is a species of beetle of the family Scarabaeidae. It is found in Nepal.

== Description ==
Adults reach a length of about 11–12.1 mm. They are dark chestnut brown, while the ventral surface is light reddish-brown.

== Etymology ==
The species is named after the architect Sandro Bruschi.
