= Neuroserica =

Scientific classification
- Kingdom: Animalia
- Phylum: Arthropoda
- Clade: Pancrustacea
- Class: Insecta
- Order: Coleoptera
- Suborder: Polyphaga
- Infraorder: Scarabaeiformia
- Family: Scarabaeidae
- Tribe: Sericini
- Genus: Neuroserica; Brenske, 1900

Genus of beetles

Neuroserica is a genus of beetles in the family Scarabaeidae.

== Species ==
- Neuroserica deffeti Burgeon, 1943
- Neuroserica fulvescens (Blanchard, 1850)
- Neuroserica unguiculata Moser, 1924
- Neuroserica usambarica Moser, 1924
