= Deroserica compressicrus =

Scientific classification
- Kingdom: Animalia
- Phylum: Arthropoda
- Class: Insecta
- Order: Coleoptera
- Suborder: Polyphaga
- Infraorder: Scarabaeiformia
- Family: Scarabaeidae
- Genus: Deroserica
- Species: D. compressicrus

Binomial name
- Deroserica compressicrus Moser, 1915

Species of beetle

Deroserica compressicrus is a species of beetle of the family Scarabaeidae. It is found in southern India (Madura, Shembaganur).

== Description ==
Adults reach a length of about 7 mm. They are completely black with light setae. The head is quite densely covered with erect bristle-like structures and the frons is widely covered with strong punctures. The antennae are yellowish-brown. The pronotum is moderately densely covered with minutely bristle-like punctures and there is a narrow central longitudinal ridge without punctures. The anterior margin and lateral margins have long, erect cilia and some long, hair-like bristles are also found on the disc, particularly behind the anterior margin. The elytra are punctate in rows in the striations, the punctures with small, pale setae. Longer setae are also found occasionally, particularly on the posterior part of the suture. The intervals are only very sparsely punctate.
