= Chrysoserica angoris =

Scientific classification
- Kingdom: Animalia
- Phylum: Arthropoda
- Class: Insecta
- Order: Coleoptera
- Suborder: Polyphaga
- Infraorder: Scarabaeiformia
- Family: Scarabaeidae
- Genus: Chrysoserica
- Species: C. angoris

Binomial name
- Chrysoserica angoris Ahrens, 2001

Species of beetle

Chrysoserica angoris is a species of beetle of the family Scarabaeidae. It is found in India (Sikkim).
