= Chrysoserica stebnickae =

Scientific classification
- Kingdom: Animalia
- Phylum: Arthropoda
- Class: Insecta
- Order: Coleoptera
- Suborder: Polyphaga
- Infraorder: Scarabaeiformia
- Family: Scarabaeidae
- Genus: Chrysoserica
- Species: C. stebnickae

Binomial name
- Chrysoserica stebnickae Ahrens, 2001

Species of beetle

Chrysoserica stebnickae is a species of beetle of the family Scarabaeidae. It is found in the Kumaon Himalaya and central Nepal.
