= Nepaloserica yeti =

Scientific classification
- Kingdom: Animalia
- Phylum: Arthropoda
- Class: Insecta
- Order: Coleoptera
- Suborder: Polyphaga
- Infraorder: Scarabaeiformia
- Family: Scarabaeidae
- Genus: Nepaloserica
- Species: N. yeti

Binomial name
- Nepaloserica yeti Ahrens, 1999

Species of beetle

Nepaloserica yeti is a species of beetle of the family Scarabaeidae. It is found in Nepal.

== Description ==
Adults reach a length of about 11 mm. They have a reddish brown, oblong-oval body. The dorsal surface is glabrous, except for the hairy lateral borders of the pronotum and elytra and the hairy head.
