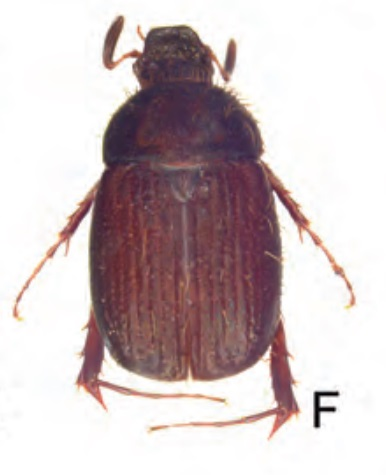

Scientific classification
- Kingdom: Animalia
- Phylum: Arthropoda
- Class: Insecta
- Order: Coleoptera
- Suborder: Polyphaga
- Infraorder: Scarabaeiformia
- Family: Scarabaeidae
- Genus: Deroserica
- Species: D. championi

Binomial name
- Deroserica championi Ahrens & Fabrizi, 2016

= Deroserica championi =

Species of beetle

Deroserica championi is a species of beetle of the family Scarabaeidae. It is found in southern India.

== Description ==
Adults reach a length of about 5.2–5.9 mm. They have a black, oval body, with dark brown elytra. The dorsal surface is dull.

== Etymology ==
The species is named for its collector, H.G. Champion.
