= Nepaloserica manasluensis =

Scientific classification
- Kingdom: Animalia
- Phylum: Arthropoda
- Class: Insecta
- Order: Coleoptera
- Suborder: Polyphaga
- Infraorder: Scarabaeiformia
- Family: Scarabaeidae
- Genus: Nepaloserica
- Species: N. manasluensis

Binomial name
- Nepaloserica manasluensis Ahrens, 2004

Species of beetle

Nepaloserica manasluensis is a species of beetle of the family Scarabaeidae. It is found in central Nepal.

== Description ==
Adults reach a length of about 11.1-11.8 mm. They have a dark brown, elongated-oval body (which is slightly broadened posteriorly).

== Etymology ==
The species name refers to its occurrence in Manaslu Himal.
