= Neuroserica usambarica =

Scientific classification
- Kingdom: Animalia
- Phylum: Arthropoda
- Clade: Pancrustacea
- Class: Insecta
- Order: Coleoptera
- Suborder: Polyphaga
- Infraorder: Scarabaeiformia
- Family: Scarabaeidae
- Genus: Neuroserica
- Species: N. usambarica

Binomial name
- Neuroserica usambarica Moser, 1924

Species of beetle

Neuroserica usambarica is a species of beetle of the family Scarabaeidae. It is found in Tanzania.

== Description ==
Adults reach a length of about 5.5 mm. They are fawn-coloured and opaque. The antennae are reddish-yellow. The pronotum is subtly punctate, while the elytra are seriato-punctate.
