= Heteroserica paradoxa =

Scientific classification
- Kingdom: Animalia
- Phylum: Arthropoda
- Class: Insecta
- Order: Coleoptera
- Suborder: Polyphaga
- Infraorder: Scarabaeiformia
- Family: Scarabaeidae
- Genus: Heteroserica
- Species: H. paradoxa

Binomial name
- Heteroserica paradoxa Brenske, 1900

Species of beetle

Heteroserica paradoxa is a species of beetle of the family Scarabaeidae. It is found in Madagascar.

== Description ==
Adults reach a length of about 6 mm. They have an ovate, somewhat broadened, glossy chestnut brown body, with a dark head and pronotum. The broad frons is densely and uniformly coarsely punctate. The pronotum is densely and strongly punctate, like the frons, slightly projecting anteriorly in the middle, with a narrow, smooth, flat margin posteriorly, the lateral setae are weak, the recurved margin is short-haired. The narrowed scutellum is punctate. The elytra are densely punctate, less densely and with larger punctures than the pronotum, without any indication of a rib.
