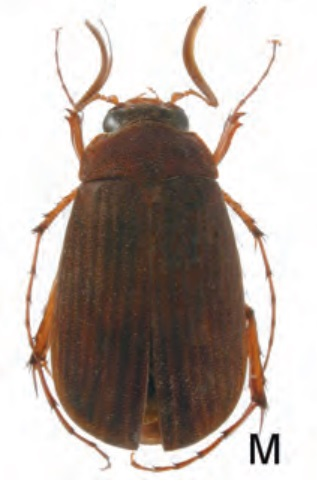

Scientific classification
- Kingdom: Animalia
- Phylum: Arthropoda
- Class: Insecta
- Order: Coleoptera
- Suborder: Polyphaga
- Infraorder: Scarabaeiformia
- Family: Scarabaeidae
- Genus: Nepaloserica
- Species: N. goomensis

Binomial name
- Nepaloserica goomensis Ahrens, 1999

= Nepaloserica goomensis =

Species of beetle

Nepaloserica goomensis is a species of beetle of the family Scarabaeidae. It is found in India (Sikkim, West Bengal).

== Description ==
Adults reach a length of about 11.1-12.2 mm. They have a chestnut-brown, oblong body, with the ventral surface lighter. The dorsal surface is glabrous, except for the hairy lateral borders of the pronotum and elytra, as well as the head.
