= Emphania ranomafanae =

Scientific classification
- Kingdom: Animalia
- Phylum: Arthropoda
- Class: Insecta
- Order: Coleoptera
- Suborder: Polyphaga
- Infraorder: Scarabaeiformia
- Family: Scarabaeidae
- Genus: Emphania
- Species: E. ranomafanae

Binomial name
- Emphania ranomafanae Ahrens & Fabrizi, 2008

Species of beetle

Emphania ranomafanae is a species of beetle of the family Scarabaeidae. It is found in Madagascar.

== Description ==
Adults reach a length of about 8.5 mm. The body surface is brown with a reddish to greenish shine.

== Etymology ==
The species is named after its occurrence in the Ranomafana National Park.
