= Trichomaladera yasutoshii =

Scientific classification
- Kingdom: Animalia
- Phylum: Arthropoda
- Class: Insecta
- Order: Coleoptera
- Suborder: Polyphaga
- Infraorder: Scarabaeiformia
- Family: Scarabaeidae
- Genus: Trichomaladera
- Species: T. yasutoshii

Binomial name
- Trichomaladera yasutoshii Kobayashi, 1991

Species of beetle

Trichomaladera yasutoshii is a species of beetle of the family Scarabaeidae. It is found in Taiwan.

== Description ==
Adults reach a length of about 13 mm. They have a light brown, elongate body, with a yellowish brown antennal club. The margins of the pronotum, the anterior tibiae and tarsi are light reddish brown, while the dorsal surface is reddish brown and the head is blackish brown.
