= Nepaloserica cheemaensis =

Scientific classification
- Kingdom: Animalia
- Phylum: Arthropoda
- Class: Insecta
- Order: Coleoptera
- Suborder: Polyphaga
- Infraorder: Scarabaeiformia
- Family: Scarabaeidae
- Genus: Nepaloserica
- Species: N. cheemaensis

Binomial name
- Nepaloserica cheemaensis Bhunia, Chandra, Gupta & Ahrens, 2021

Species of beetle

Nepaloserica cheemaensis is a species of beetle of the family Scarabaeidae. It is found in India (Sikkim).

== Description ==
Adults reach a length of about 12.8 mm. They have an oblong–oval body. The dorsal surface is dark reddish-brown, while the ventral surface is dark reddish-brown and dull. The head is moderately shiny and the surface is mostly glabrous, except for a few single setae.

== Etymology ==
The species is named after its type locality, Cheema.
