= Lamproserica salaama =

Scientific classification
- Kingdom: Animalia
- Phylum: Arthropoda
- Class: Insecta
- Order: Coleoptera
- Suborder: Polyphaga
- Infraorder: Scarabaeiformia
- Family: Scarabaeidae
- Genus: Lamproserica
- Species: L. salaama

Binomial name
- Lamproserica salaama Brenske, 1902

Species of beetle

Lamproserica salaama is a species of beetle of the family Scarabaeidae. It is found in Tanzania.

== Description ==
Adults reach a length of about 6 mm. They are very similar to Lamproserica mombasana, but the middle of the pronotum is not smooth and the sides are slightly curved backwards. Also, the hind femora are less broadened at the base and the hind tibiae are short.
