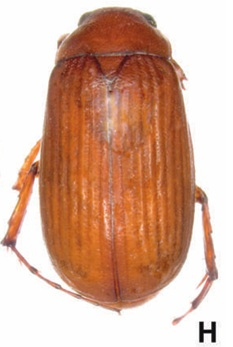

Scientific classification
- Kingdom: Animalia
- Phylum: Arthropoda
- Class: Insecta
- Order: Coleoptera
- Suborder: Polyphaga
- Infraorder: Scarabaeiformia
- Family: Scarabaeidae
- Genus: Nepaloserica
- Species: N. nielamuensis

Binomial name
- Nepaloserica nielamuensis Liu & Ahrens, 2014

= Nepaloserica nielamuensis =

Species of beetle

Nepaloserica nielamuensis is a species of beetle of the family Scarabaeidae. It is found in China (Xizang).

== Description ==
Adults reach a length of about 9.3–11.3 mm. They have an oblong body. The dorsal and ventral surface are reddish brown and dull and the antennae are brown. Except for a few setae on the head, they are sparsely setose.

== Etymology ==
The species is named after the type locality, Nielamu.
