= Nepaloserica mustangia =

Scientific classification
- Kingdom: Animalia
- Phylum: Arthropoda
- Class: Insecta
- Order: Coleoptera
- Suborder: Polyphaga
- Infraorder: Scarabaeiformia
- Family: Scarabaeidae
- Genus: Nepaloserica
- Species: N. mustangia

Binomial name
- Nepaloserica mustangia Ahrens & Sabatinelli, 1996

Species of beetle

Nepaloserica mustangia is a species of beetle of the family Scarabaeidae. It is found in Nepal.

== Description ==
Adults reach a length of about 10.6 mm. They have a dark brown, egg-shaped body. The ventral surface, legs and antennae and the margins of the pronotum are somewhat lighter.
