= Aphenoserica fallax =

Scientific classification
- Kingdom: Animalia
- Phylum: Arthropoda
- Clade: Pancrustacea
- Class: Insecta
- Order: Coleoptera
- Suborder: Polyphaga
- Infraorder: Scarabaeiformia
- Family: Scarabaeidae
- Genus: Aphenoserica
- Species: A. fallax

Binomial name
- Aphenoserica fallax Brenske, 1901

Synonyms
- Aphenoserica fallax loloana Brenske, 1901; Aphenoserica fallax samliana Brenske, 1901

Species of beetle

Aphenoserica fallax is a species of beetle of the family Scarabaeidae. It is found in Cameroon, Equatorial Guinea, Gabon, the Democratic Republic of the Congo and the Republic of the Congo.

== Description ==
Adults reach a length of about 8 mm. They are dull above, faintly shimmering below, with a yellow and black spotted elytra, a metallic-shining head shield, a greenish pronotum and yellow legs. The underside is without scales, while the upper side is only sparsely scaled.
