= Nepaloserica vilya =

Scientific classification
- Kingdom: Animalia
- Phylum: Arthropoda
- Class: Insecta
- Order: Coleoptera
- Suborder: Polyphaga
- Infraorder: Scarabaeiformia
- Family: Scarabaeidae
- Genus: Nepaloserica
- Species: N. vilya

Binomial name
- Nepaloserica vilya Ahrens & Sabatinelli, 1996

Species of beetle

Nepaloserica vilya is a species of beetle of the family Scarabaeidae. It is found in Nepal.

== Description ==
Adults reach a length of about 11.5–12.5 mm. They have a dark reddish-brown, elongate-oval body. The ventral surface is somewhat lighter.
