= Nepaloserica phulcokiensis =

Scientific classification
- Kingdom: Animalia
- Phylum: Arthropoda
- Class: Insecta
- Order: Coleoptera
- Suborder: Polyphaga
- Infraorder: Scarabaeiformia
- Family: Scarabaeidae
- Genus: Nepaloserica
- Species: N. phulcokiensis

Binomial name
- Nepaloserica phulcokiensis Ahrens & Sabatinelli, 1996

Species of beetle

Nepaloserica phulcokiensis is a species of beetle of the family Scarabaeidae. It is found in Nepal.

== Description ==
Adults reach a length of about 9.9 mm. They are reddish-brown.
