= Pseudosericania daxueshana =

Scientific classification
- Kingdom: Animalia
- Phylum: Arthropoda
- Class: Insecta
- Order: Coleoptera
- Suborder: Polyphaga
- Infraorder: Scarabaeiformia
- Family: Scarabaeidae
- Genus: Pseudosericania
- Species: P. daxueshana

Binomial name
- Pseudosericania daxueshana Kobayashi, 2020

Species of beetle

Pseudosericania daxueshana is a species of beetle of the family Scarabaeidae. It is found in Taiwan.

== Description ==
Adults reach a length of about 9.5–10 mm. They have an elongate oval, gently convex body. The dorsal surface is chestnut brown, but sometimes more darkened on the head and pronotum. The antennae are yellowish brown and weakly shining. The ventral surface is light chestnut brown, and dully shining, while the legs are rather strongly shining. Dorsal and ventral sides are almost glabrous, but with a few sparse erect hairs on the clypeus, elytra and abdomen.

== Etymology ==
The species is named after its type locality, Daxueshan, Taichung County in Taiwan.
