= Emphania metallica =

Scientific classification
- Kingdom: Animalia
- Phylum: Arthropoda
- Class: Insecta
- Order: Coleoptera
- Suborder: Polyphaga
- Infraorder: Scarabaeiformia
- Family: Scarabaeidae
- Genus: Emphania
- Species: E. metallica

Binomial name
- Emphania metallica (Blanchard, 1850)

Synonyms
- Heptomera metallica Blanchard, 1850; Emphania chloris Burmeister, 1855

Species of beetle

Emphania metallica is a species of beetle of the family Scarabaeidae. It is found in Madagascar.

== Description ==
Adults reach a length of about 7.9-8.5 mm. They have an oval body. The dorsal surface is brown with a greenish shine, and the ventral surface is metallic-green. They are completely shiny and glabrous, except for a few small setae on the head.
