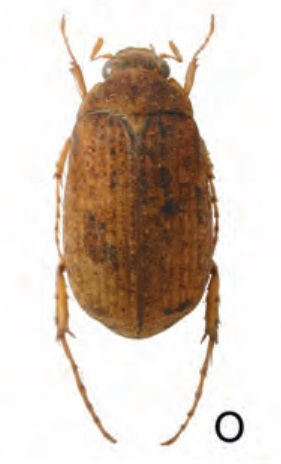

Scientific classification
- Kingdom: Animalia
- Phylum: Arthropoda
- Class: Insecta
- Order: Coleoptera
- Suborder: Polyphaga
- Infraorder: Scarabaeiformia
- Family: Scarabaeidae
- Genus: Chrysoserica
- Species: C. auricoma

Binomial name
- Chrysoserica auricoma (Brenske, 1896)

Synonyms
- Serica auricoma Brenske, 1896

= Chrysoserica auricoma =

Species of beetle

Chrysoserica auricoma is a species of beetle of the family Scarabaeidae. It is found along the southern face of the Himalayas from central Nepal to Sikkim and the Khasi Hills, towards Yunnan and the northern mountains of Indochina (Thailand, Laos, Vietnam). There are records from southern India, but these are probably based on misidentifications.

== Description ==
Adults reach a length of about 11–12 mm. The clypeus is smooth with scattered fine punctures and a few weak setae, the margin slightly raised, scarcely higher in the middle, with a small tubercle and a transverse impression in front of the suture line. The suture is weak. The frons is finely punctured with longer, erect hairs. The pronotum is punctate with short, almost widely spaced punctures, strongly projecting anterior angles, right-angled, finely rounded posterior angles, and almost straight sides widening posteriorly. The scutellum is large, finely punctured and smooth in the middle. The elytra are distinctly striated, with a dense row of coarse punctures and more scattered, irregular ones in the furrows, some with a small white bristle. The raised ribs are smooth and bear only a few punctures, in which short white setae are noticeable, especially near the apex. The elytra, like the head and pronotum, have a dull golden-yellow sheen with scattered, indistinct brown spots, which are most noticeable on both sides of the middle of the pronotum, around the scutellum, and on the ribs. The pygidium is strongly convex and punctate, with a few weak, short hairs, and rounded to a point.
