= Nepaloserica muelleri =

Scientific classification
- Kingdom: Animalia
- Phylum: Arthropoda
- Class: Insecta
- Order: Coleoptera
- Suborder: Polyphaga
- Infraorder: Scarabaeiformia
- Family: Scarabaeidae
- Genus: Nepaloserica
- Species: N. muelleri

Binomial name
- Nepaloserica muelleri Ahrens & Sabatinelli, 1996

Species of beetle

Nepaloserica muelleri is a species of beetle of the family Scarabaeidae. It is found in western and central Nepal.

== Description ==
Adults reach a length of about 10–11 mm. They have a brown, elongated-oval body (which is slightly broadened posteriorly).

== Subspecies ==
- Nepaloserica muelleri muelleri (western and central Nepal)
- Nepaloserica muelleri tuberculata Ahrens, 2004 (western and central Nepal)
