= Heteroserica tridens =

Scientific classification
- Kingdom: Animalia
- Phylum: Arthropoda
- Class: Insecta
- Order: Coleoptera
- Suborder: Polyphaga
- Infraorder: Scarabaeiformia
- Family: Scarabaeidae
- Genus: Heteroserica
- Species: H. tridens

Binomial name
- Heteroserica tridens Frey, 1975

Species of beetle

Heteroserica tridens is a species of beetle of the family Scarabaeidae. It is found in Madagascar.

== Description ==
Adults reach a length of about 6 mm. The pronotum is extremely densely and coarsely punctate. The elytra are uniformly densely and coarsely punctate with very indistinct striae.
