= Nepaloserica archolabrata =

Scientific classification
- Kingdom: Animalia
- Phylum: Arthropoda
- Class: Insecta
- Order: Coleoptera
- Suborder: Polyphaga
- Infraorder: Scarabaeiformia
- Family: Scarabaeidae
- Genus: Nepaloserica
- Species: N. archolabrata

Binomial name
- Nepaloserica archolabrata Ahrens & Sabatinelli, 1996

Species of beetle

Nepaloserica archolabrata is a species of beetle of the family Scarabaeidae. It is found in Nepal and China (Xizang).

== Description ==
Adults reach a length of about 10.2 mm. They are dark reddish-brown, with the ventral surface lighter.
