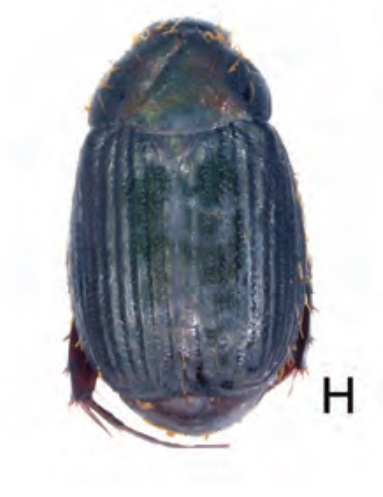

Scientific classification
- Kingdom: Animalia
- Phylum: Arthropoda
- Clade: Pancrustacea
- Class: Insecta
- Order: Coleoptera
- Suborder: Polyphaga
- Infraorder: Scarabaeiformia
- Family: Scarabaeidae
- Genus: Deroserica
- Species: D. kulzeri

Binomial name
- Deroserica kulzeri (Frey, 1976)

Synonyms
- Neoserica kulzeri Frey, 1976

= Deroserica kulzeri =

Species of beetle

Deroserica kulzeri is a species of beetle of the family Scarabaeidae. It is found in India (Kerala).

== Description ==
Adults reach a length of about 7.5 mm. They have a black, oval body. The dorsal surface is dull with yellowish hairs.
