= Nepaloserica induwae =

Scientific classification
- Kingdom: Animalia
- Phylum: Arthropoda
- Class: Insecta
- Order: Coleoptera
- Suborder: Polyphaga
- Infraorder: Scarabaeiformia
- Family: Scarabaeidae
- Genus: Nepaloserica
- Species: N. induwae

Binomial name
- Nepaloserica induwae Ahrens, 1999

Species of beetle

Nepaloserica induwae is a species of beetle of the family Scarabaeidae. It is found in Nepal.

== Description ==
Adults reach a length of about 10.4 mm. They have a reddish brown, oblong body, which is strongly widened posteriorly. The dorsal surface is glabrous.
