= Nepaloserica schmidti =

Scientific classification
- Kingdom: Animalia
- Phylum: Arthropoda
- Class: Insecta
- Order: Coleoptera
- Suborder: Polyphaga
- Infraorder: Scarabaeiformia
- Family: Scarabaeidae
- Genus: Nepaloserica
- Species: N. schmidti

Binomial name
- Nepaloserica schmidti Ahrens & Sabatinelli, 1996

Species of beetle

Nepaloserica schmidti is a species of beetle of the family Scarabaeidae. It is found in Nepal.

== Description ==
Adults reach a length of about 11.5 mm. They have a dark brown, elongate-oval body. The ventral surface, legs and antennae are light yellowish-brown.
