= Trichomaladera yui =

Scientific classification
- Kingdom: Animalia
- Phylum: Arthropoda
- Class: Insecta
- Order: Coleoptera
- Suborder: Polyphaga
- Infraorder: Scarabaeiformia
- Family: Scarabaeidae
- Genus: Trichomaladera
- Species: T. yui

Binomial name
- Trichomaladera yui Kobayashi, 1993

Species of beetle

Trichomaladera yui is a species of beetle of the family Scarabaeidae. It is found in Taiwan.

== Description ==
Adults reach a length of about 13-13.5 mm. They have a light reddish brown, elongate oval body, with the antennal club more reddish brown than the ventral surface, and with the tibiae and tarsi reddish brown. The dorsal surface is light reddish brown or dark reddish brown. The surface of the body is opaque, with the clypeus, antennae, tibiae and tarsi shining.
