= Conioserica eisermanni =

Scientific classification
- Kingdom: Animalia
- Phylum: Arthropoda
- Clade: Pancrustacea
- Class: Insecta
- Order: Coleoptera
- Suborder: Polyphaga
- Infraorder: Scarabaeiformia
- Family: Scarabaeidae
- Genus: Conioserica
- Species: C. eisermanni

Binomial name
- Conioserica eisermanni Brenske, 1902

Species of beetle

Conioserica eisermanni is a species of beetle of the family Scarabaeidae. It is found in Sierra Leone.

== Description ==
Adults reach a length of about 6 mm. They have a short, egg-shaped, dull brown, silky-glossy body. The frons is finely punctate. The pronotum is scarcely projecting anteriorly in the middle and the sides are very weakly rounded, the posterior angles almost angular. The surface is very densely punctate, with a faintly indicated raised longitudinal line in front of the scutellum. The elytra are densely and confusedly punctate in the striae. The intervals are distinctly raised, alternately stronger and wider and the marginal setae are distinct.
