= Nepaloserica telbrungensis =

Scientific classification
- Kingdom: Animalia
- Phylum: Arthropoda
- Class: Insecta
- Order: Coleoptera
- Suborder: Polyphaga
- Infraorder: Scarabaeiformia
- Family: Scarabaeidae
- Genus: Nepaloserica
- Species: N. telbrungensis

Binomial name
- Nepaloserica telbrungensis Ahrens, 1999

Species of beetle

Nepaloserica telbrungensis is a species of beetle of the family Scarabaeidae. It is found in Nepal.

== Description ==
Adults reach a length of about 10.4-11.9 mm. They have a dark brown, egg-shaped body, with the ventral surface lighter reddish. The dorsal surface is glabrous.
