= Nepaloserica rufobrunnea =

Scientific classification
- Kingdom: Animalia
- Phylum: Arthropoda
- Class: Insecta
- Order: Coleoptera
- Suborder: Polyphaga
- Infraorder: Scarabaeiformia
- Family: Scarabaeidae
- Genus: Nepaloserica
- Species: N. rufobrunnea

Binomial name
- Nepaloserica rufobrunnea Ahrens, 1999

Species of beetle

Nepaloserica rufobrunnea is a species of beetle of the family Scarabaeidae. It is found in Bhutan.

== Description ==
Adults reach a length of about 10.6–11.2 mm. They have a reddish-brown, oblong body. The dorsal surface is glabrous.
