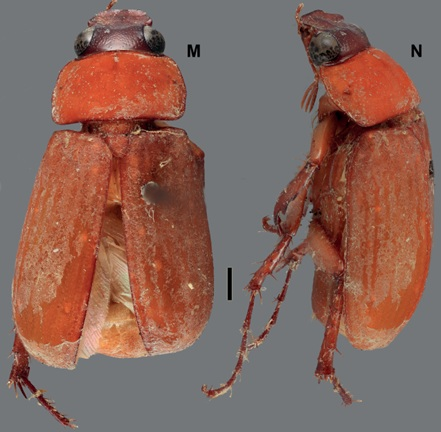

Scientific classification
- Kingdom: Animalia
- Phylum: Arthropoda
- Clade: Pancrustacea
- Class: Insecta
- Order: Coleoptera
- Suborder: Polyphaga
- Infraorder: Scarabaeiformia
- Family: Scarabaeidae
- Genus: Sayloria
- Species: S. pottsi

Binomial name
- Sayloria pottsi (Saylor, 1946)

Synonyms
- Astaena pottsi Saylor, 1946

= Sayloria pottsi =

Species of beetle

Sayloria pottsi is a species of beetle of the family Scarabaeidae. It is found in Peru.

== Description ==
Adults reach a length of about 11 mm. The head is reddish-brown with setae. The surface of the pronotum and elytra is without setae. Both the pronotum and elytra are unicolored brownish-orange.
