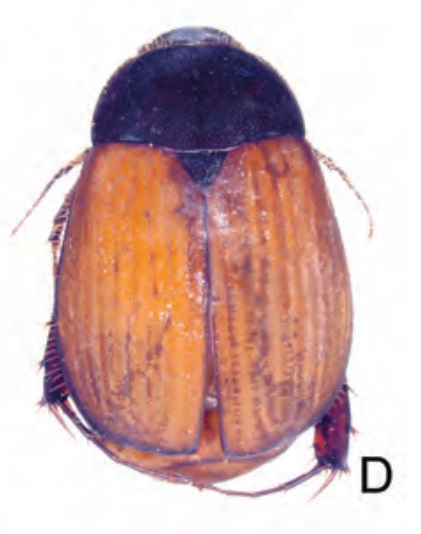

Scientific classification
- Kingdom: Animalia
- Phylum: Arthropoda
- Clade: Pancrustacea
- Class: Insecta
- Order: Coleoptera
- Suborder: Polyphaga
- Infraorder: Scarabaeiformia
- Family: Scarabaeidae
- Genus: Meriserica
- Species: M. setosicollis

Binomial name
- Meriserica setosicollis (Frey, 1976)

Synonyms
- Neoserica setosicollis Frey, 1976

= Meriserica setosicollis =

Species of beetle

Meriserica setosicollis is a species of beetle of the family Scarabaeidae. It is found in India (Kerala).

== Description ==
Adults reach a length of about 9.6 mm. They have a dark brown, egg-shaped body. The antennae are yellow, while the abdomen and elytra are light reddish brown. The dorsal surface is dull.
