= Nepaloserica helambuensis =

Scientific classification
- Kingdom: Animalia
- Phylum: Arthropoda
- Class: Insecta
- Order: Coleoptera
- Suborder: Polyphaga
- Infraorder: Scarabaeiformia
- Family: Scarabaeidae
- Genus: Nepaloserica
- Species: N. helambuensis

Binomial name
- Nepaloserica helambuensis Ahrens & Sabatinelli, 1996

Species of beetle

Nepaloserica helambuensis is a species of beetle of the family Scarabaeidae. It is found in Nepal.

== Description ==
Adults reach a length of about 12 mm. The dorsal surface is dark brown, while the ventral surface, margins of the pronotum and the elytra are lighter brown.
