= Hoplomaladera =

Scientific classification
- Kingdom: Animalia
- Phylum: Arthropoda
- Class: Insecta
- Order: Coleoptera
- Suborder: Polyphaga
- Infraorder: Scarabaeiformia
- Family: Scarabaeidae
- Tribe: Sericini
- Subtribe: Sericina
- Genus: Hoplomaladera; Nomura, 1974

Genus of leaf beetles

Hoplomaladera is a genus of beetles belonging to the family Scarabaeidae.

== Species ==
- Hoplomaladera hualiensis Kobayashi, 2001
- Hoplomaladera kurosawai Kobayashi, 2001
- Hoplomaladera monticola Kobayashi, 1991
- Hoplomaladera saitoi Kobayashi, 1975
- Hoplomaladera shibatai Nomura, 1974
- Hoplomaladera taitungensis Kobayashi, 2015
