= Nepaloserica perrecondita =

Scientific classification
- Kingdom: Animalia
- Phylum: Arthropoda
- Class: Insecta
- Order: Coleoptera
- Suborder: Polyphaga
- Infraorder: Scarabaeiformia
- Family: Scarabaeidae
- Genus: Nepaloserica
- Species: N. perrecondita

Binomial name
- Nepaloserica perrecondita Ahrens, 2004

Species of beetle

Nepaloserica perrecondita is a species of beetle of the family Scarabaeidae. It is found in eastern, western and central Nepal.

== Description ==
Adults reach a length of about 9.7 mm. They have a reddish-brown, oblong-oval body. They are dull and the upper surface is glabrous.

== Etymology ==
The species name is derived from Latin perreconditus (meaning very hidden).
