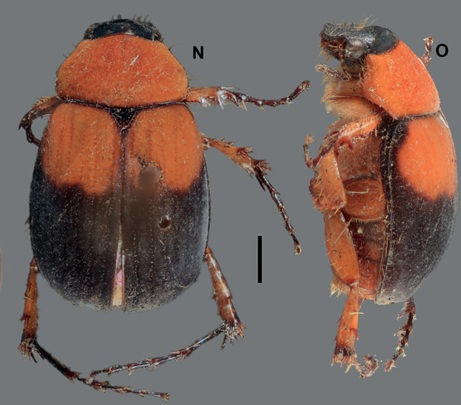

Scientific classification
- Kingdom: Animalia
- Phylum: Arthropoda
- Clade: Pancrustacea
- Class: Insecta
- Order: Coleoptera
- Suborder: Polyphaga
- Infraorder: Scarabaeiformia
- Family: Scarabaeidae
- Genus: Sayloria
- Species: S. bicoloripes

Binomial name
- Sayloria bicoloripes (Saylor, 1946)

Synonyms
- Astaena bicoloripes Saylor, 1946; Astaena postnodata Frey, 1973

= Sayloria bicoloripes =

Species of beetle

Sayloria bicoloripes is a species of beetle of the family Scarabaeidae. It is found in Peru.

== Description ==
Adults reach a length of about 6.5 mm. The head is black with upright setae. The surface of the pronotum and elytra is without setae. The pronotum is unicolored brownish-orange, while the elytra are bicolored.
