= Nepaloserica baehri =

Scientific classification
- Kingdom: Animalia
- Phylum: Arthropoda
- Class: Insecta
- Order: Coleoptera
- Suborder: Polyphaga
- Infraorder: Scarabaeiformia
- Family: Scarabaeidae
- Genus: Nepaloserica
- Species: N. baehri

Binomial name
- Nepaloserica baehri Ahrens & Sabatinelli, 1996

Species of beetle

Nepaloserica baehri is a species of beetle of the family Scarabaeidae. It is found in Nepal.

== Description ==
Adults reach a length of about 11.8 mm. They have an elongate egg-shaped body. Both the dorsal and ventral surface are reddish-brown and they are covered with fine, soft hairs, except for the labroclypeus.

== Etymology ==
The species is named after Dr. Martin Baehr.
