= Hoplomaladera kurosawai =

Scientific classification
- Kingdom: Animalia
- Phylum: Arthropoda
- Class: Insecta
- Order: Coleoptera
- Suborder: Polyphaga
- Infraorder: Scarabaeiformia
- Family: Scarabaeidae
- Genus: Hoplomaladera
- Species: H. kurosawai

Binomial name
- Hoplomaladera kurosawai Kobayashi, 2001

Species of beetle

Hoplomaladera kurosawai is a species of beetle of the family Scarabaeidae. It is found in Taiwan.

== Description ==
Adults reach a length of about 8.5-11 mm. They have an elonate oval, yellowish brown body. The head, tibiae and tarsi are reddish-brown, and the middle of the pronotum and abdomen ae dark reddish brown or dark yelllowish brown.
