= Rhynchoserica clypeata =

Scientific classification
- Kingdom: Animalia
- Phylum: Arthropoda
- Class: Insecta
- Order: Coleoptera
- Suborder: Polyphaga
- Infraorder: Scarabaeiformia
- Family: Scarabaeidae
- Genus: Rhynchoserica
- Species: R. clypeata

Binomial name
- Rhynchoserica clypeata Frey, 1968

Species of beetle

Rhynchoserica clypeata is a species of beetle of the family Scarabaeidae. It is found in the Democratic Republic of the Congo and Burundi.

== Description ==
Adults reach a length of about 5 mm. The upper and lower surfaces are reddish-brown, glossy. The upper surface is glabrous, while the underside and pygidium are sparsely hairy. The upper surface of the clypeus, frons, and vertex are finely, sparsely, and irregularly punctate, while the pronotum, elytra and scutellum are moderately coarsely punctate. Each elytron has an almost smooth stria.
