= Hoplomaladera hualiensis =

Scientific classification
- Kingdom: Animalia
- Phylum: Arthropoda
- Class: Insecta
- Order: Coleoptera
- Suborder: Polyphaga
- Infraorder: Scarabaeiformia
- Family: Scarabaeidae
- Genus: Hoplomaladera
- Species: H. hualiensis

Binomial name
- Hoplomaladera hualiensis Kobayashi, 2001

Species of beetle

Hoplomaladera hualiensis is a species of beetle of the family Scarabaeidae. It is found in Taiwan.

== Description ==
Adults reach a length of about 7.5 mm. They have an oblong-oval body. The dorsal surface is dark reddish brown, with yellowish-brown antennae and a reddish-brown clypeus.
