= Lamproserica manyara =

Scientific classification
- Kingdom: Animalia
- Phylum: Arthropoda
- Class: Insecta
- Order: Coleoptera
- Suborder: Polyphaga
- Infraorder: Scarabaeiformia
- Family: Scarabaeidae
- Genus: Lamproserica
- Species: L. manyara

Binomial name
- Lamproserica manyara Frey, 1962

Species of beetle

Lamproserica manyara is a species of beetle of the family Scarabaeidae. It is found in Tanzania.

== Description ==
Adults reach a length of about 7-7.5 mm. They have an egg-shaped, yellowish-brown body. The head and elytra are shiny, while the pronotum and underside are less shiny and somewhat tomentose. The dorsal surface is smooth.
