= Leoserica knysnana =

Scientific classification
- Kingdom: Animalia
- Phylum: Arthropoda
- Clade: Pancrustacea
- Class: Insecta
- Order: Coleoptera
- Suborder: Polyphaga
- Infraorder: Scarabaeiformia
- Family: Scarabaeidae
- Genus: Leoserica
- Species: L. knysnana

Binomial name
- Leoserica knysnana Fabrizi, Eberle & Ahrens, 2019

Species of beetle

Leoserica knysnana is a species of beetle of the family Scarabaeidae. It is found in South Africa (Western Cape).

== Description ==
Adults reach a length of about 7.9–9.1 mm.

== Etymology ==
The species is named after its occurrence close to Knysna.
