= Nepaloserica lamjungi =

Scientific classification
- Kingdom: Animalia
- Phylum: Arthropoda
- Class: Insecta
- Order: Coleoptera
- Suborder: Polyphaga
- Infraorder: Scarabaeiformia
- Family: Scarabaeidae
- Genus: Nepaloserica
- Species: N. lamjungi

Binomial name
- Nepaloserica lamjungi Ahrens, 1999

Species of beetle

Nepaloserica lamjungi is a species of beetle of the family Scarabaeidae. It is found in Nepal.

== Description ==
Adults reach a length of about 12–14 mm. They have a chestnut brown, oblong-oval body, with the sides of the pronotum lighter anteriorly. The dorsal surface is glabrous, except for the hairs along the lateral borders of the pronotum and elytra.
