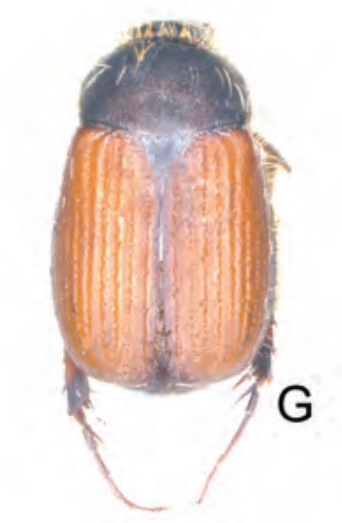

Scientific classification
- Kingdom: Animalia
- Phylum: Arthropoda
- Class: Insecta
- Order: Coleoptera
- Suborder: Polyphaga
- Infraorder: Scarabaeiformia
- Family: Scarabaeidae
- Genus: Deroserica
- Species: D. koelleri

Binomial name
- Deroserica koelleri Ahrens & Fabrizi, 2016

= Deroserica koelleri =

Species of beetle

Deroserica koelleri is a species of beetle of the family Scarabaeidae. It is found in India (Karnataka).

== Description ==
Adults reach a length of about 6.6–7.1 mm. They have a black, oval body, with reddish brown elytra and yellowish antennae and hairs. The dorsal surface is dull.

== Etymology ==
The species is named for its collector, Köller.
