= Nepaloserica hartmanni =

Scientific classification
- Kingdom: Animalia
- Phylum: Arthropoda
- Class: Insecta
- Order: Coleoptera
- Suborder: Polyphaga
- Infraorder: Scarabaeiformia
- Family: Scarabaeidae
- Genus: Nepaloserica
- Species: N. hartmanni

Binomial name
- Nepaloserica hartmanni Ahrens, 1999

Species of beetle

Nepaloserica hartmanni is a species of beetle of the family Scarabaeidae. It is found in Nepal.

== Description ==
Adults reach a length of about 12-12.5 mm. They have a chestnut brown, oblong body. The dorsal surface is glabrous.

== Etymology ==
The species is named after one of its collectors, Matthias Hartman.
