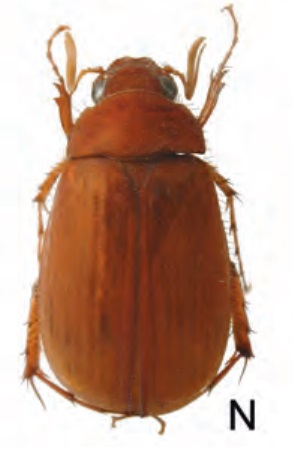

Scientific classification
- Kingdom: Animalia
- Phylum: Arthropoda
- Class: Insecta
- Order: Coleoptera
- Suborder: Polyphaga
- Infraorder: Scarabaeiformia
- Family: Scarabaeidae
- Genus: Nepaloserica
- Species: N. ganeshi

Binomial name
- Nepaloserica ganeshi Ahrens, 1999

= Nepaloserica ganeshi =

Species of beetle

Nepaloserica ganeshi is a species of beetle of the family Scarabaeidae. It is found in central Nepal and China (Xizang).

== Description ==
Adults reach a length of about 10.2-10.3 mm. They have a reddish-brown, oblong body. The dorsal surface is glabrous.
