= Trichomaladera =

Scientific classification
- Kingdom: Animalia
- Phylum: Arthropoda
- Class: Insecta
- Order: Coleoptera
- Suborder: Polyphaga
- Infraorder: Scarabaeiformia
- Family: Scarabaeidae
- Tribe: Sericini
- Subtribe: Sericina
- Genus: Trichomaladera; Nomura, 1974

Genus of leaf beetles

Trichomaladera is a genus of beetles belonging to the family Scarabaeidae.

== Species ==
- Trichomaladera elongata Nomura, 1974
- Trichomaladera infortunata Ahrens, 2002
- Trichomaladera rufofusca Nomura & Kobayashi, 1979
- Trichomaladera yasutoshii Kobayashi, 1991
- Trichomaladera yui Kobayashi, 1993
