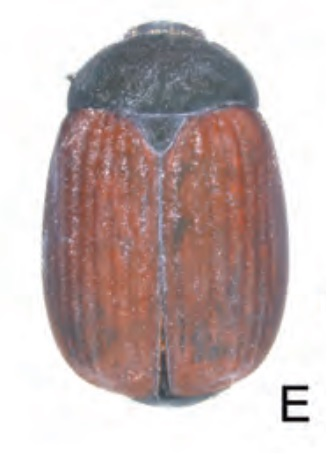

Scientific classification
- Kingdom: Animalia
- Phylum: Arthropoda
- Class: Insecta
- Order: Coleoptera
- Suborder: Polyphaga
- Infraorder: Scarabaeiformia
- Family: Scarabaeidae
- Genus: Meriserica
- Species: M. oberthuri

Binomial name
- Meriserica oberthuri Brenske, 1898

= Meriserica oberthuri =

Species of beetle

Meriserica oberthuri is a species of beetle of the family Scarabaeidae. It is found in southern India. Although also recorded from Assam and Kurseong, these records are doubtful.

== Description ==
Adults reach a length of about 10–11.5 mm. They have a black, oblong-oval body, while the elytra are sometimes reddish-brown. The upper surface is dull and covered with dark hairs on the head and close to the anterior angles of the pronotum, the remainder is glabrous.
