= Nepaloserica fabriziae =

Scientific classification
- Kingdom: Animalia
- Phylum: Arthropoda
- Class: Insecta
- Order: Coleoptera
- Suborder: Polyphaga
- Infraorder: Scarabaeiformia
- Family: Scarabaeidae
- Genus: Nepaloserica
- Species: N. fabriziae

Binomial name
- Nepaloserica fabriziae Ahrens, 1999

Synonyms
- Nepaloserica fabrizii

Species of beetle

Nepaloserica fabriziae is a species of beetle of the family Scarabaeidae. It is found in India (Sikkim).

== Description ==
Adults reach a length of about 9.6 mm. They have a chestnut brown, oblong-oval body, with the ventral surface lighter. The dorsal surface is glabrous, except for the hairs along the lateral borders of the pronotum and elytra and on the head.

== Etymology ==
The species is named after its collector, Silvia Fabrizi.
