= Chrysoserica gigantea =

Scientific classification
- Kingdom: Animalia
- Phylum: Arthropoda
- Class: Insecta
- Order: Coleoptera
- Suborder: Polyphaga
- Infraorder: Scarabaeiformia
- Family: Scarabaeidae
- Genus: Chrysoserica
- Species: C. gigantea

Binomial name
- Chrysoserica gigantea Brenske, 1898

Species of beetle

Chrysoserica gigantea is a species of beetle of the family Scarabaeidae. It is found in India (Khasi Hills and Assam).

== Description ==
Adults reach a length of about 12–14 mm. The clypeus is smooth with scattered, dull punctation, the middle of the anterior margin projecting. The pronotum has projecting anterior and weakly rounded posterior angles, without hairs, but with dark markings on both sides of the middle. The scutellum is long and sparsely punctate. The elytra have nine distinct striae, the furrows of which are densely punctate, the intervals with scattered dark spots.
