= Nepaloserica barbara =

Scientific classification
- Kingdom: Animalia
- Phylum: Arthropoda
- Class: Insecta
- Order: Coleoptera
- Suborder: Polyphaga
- Infraorder: Scarabaeiformia
- Family: Scarabaeidae
- Genus: Nepaloserica
- Species: N. barbara

Binomial name
- Nepaloserica barbara Ahrens & Sabatinelli, 1996

Species of beetle

Nepaloserica barbara is a species of beetle of the family Scarabaeidae. It is found in India (Sikkim).

== Description ==
Adults reach a length of about 8.6 mm. They have a chestnut brown, elongate-oval body, with the legs and antennae lighter.
