= Heteroserica reticulata =

Scientific classification
- Kingdom: Animalia
- Phylum: Arthropoda
- Class: Insecta
- Order: Coleoptera
- Suborder: Polyphaga
- Infraorder: Scarabaeiformia
- Family: Scarabaeidae
- Genus: Heteroserica
- Species: H. reticulata

Binomial name
- Heteroserica reticulata Frey, 1975

Species of beetle

Heteroserica reticulata is a species of beetle of the family Scarabaeidae. It is found in Madagascar.

== Description ==
Adults reach a length of about 5 mm. The upper and lower surfaces are shiny black. The upper surface is glabrous and the sides of the pronotum and elytra are sparsely fringed with light brown hairs. The antennae are dark brown.
