= Nepaloserica vignai =

Scientific classification
- Kingdom: Animalia
- Phylum: Arthropoda
- Class: Insecta
- Order: Coleoptera
- Suborder: Polyphaga
- Infraorder: Scarabaeiformia
- Family: Scarabaeidae
- Genus: Nepaloserica
- Species: N. vignai

Binomial name
- Nepaloserica vignai Ahrens & Sabatinelli, 1996

Species of beetle

Nepaloserica vignai is a species of beetle of the family Scarabaeidae. It is found in Nepal.

== Description ==
Adults reach a length of about 10.6 mm. They have a reddish-brown, elongate–oval body. The surface is covered with fine, soft hairs.

== Etymology ==
The species is named after Prof. Augusto Vigna Taglianti.
