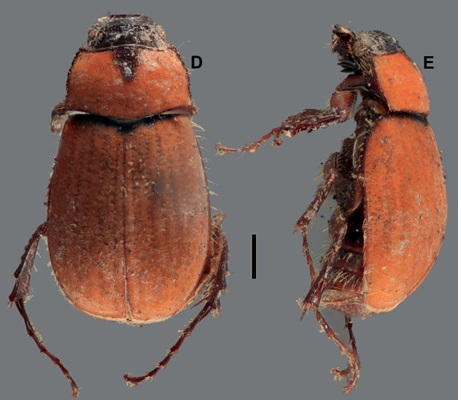

Scientific classification
- Kingdom: Animalia
- Phylum: Arthropoda
- Clade: Pancrustacea
- Class: Insecta
- Order: Coleoptera
- Suborder: Polyphaga
- Infraorder: Scarabaeiformia
- Family: Scarabaeidae
- Genus: Sayloria
- Species: S. abcora

Binomial name
- Sayloria abcora (Saylor, 1946)

Synonyms
- Astaena abcora Saylor, 1946; Astaena apolinar-maria Saylor, 1946

= Sayloria abcora =

Species of beetle

Sayloria abcora is a species of beetle of the family Scarabaeidae. It is found in Colombia.

== Description ==
Adults reach a length of about 7 mm. The head is black with simple setae. The surface of the pronotum and elytra is without setae. The pronotum is bicolored, while the elytra are unicolored brownish-orange.
