= Emphania lacroixi =

Scientific classification
- Kingdom: Animalia
- Phylum: Arthropoda
- Class: Insecta
- Order: Coleoptera
- Suborder: Polyphaga
- Infraorder: Scarabaeiformia
- Family: Scarabaeidae
- Genus: Emphania
- Species: E. lacroixi

Binomial name
- Emphania lacroixi Ahrens & Fabrizi, 2008

Species of beetle

Emphania lacroixi is a species of beetle of the family Scarabaeidae. It is found in Madagascar.

== Description ==
Adults reach a length of about 8.2–9.9 mm. The body surface is brown with a greenish shine.

== Etymology ==
The species is dedicated to Marc Lacroix.
