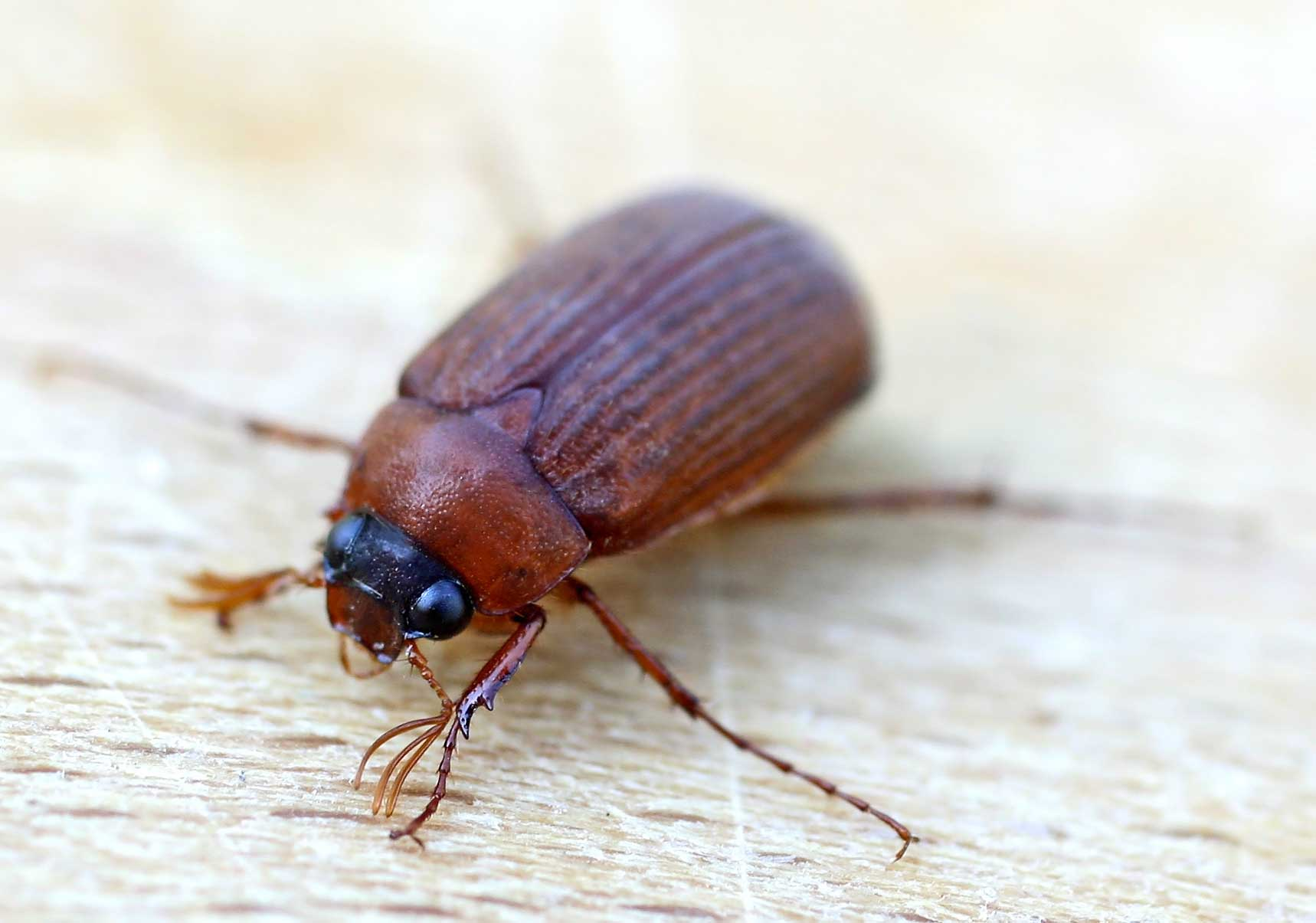
- Serica brunnea

Scientific classification
- Kingdom: Animalia
- Phylum: Arthropoda
- Clade: Pancrustacea
- Class: Insecta
- Order: Coleoptera
- Suborder: Polyphaga
- Infraorder: Scarabaeiformia
- Family: Scarabaeidae
- Subfamily: Sericinae
- Tribe: Sericini; Kirby, 1837

= Sericini =

Tribe of beetles

Sericini is a tribe of scarab beetles that belongs to the subfamily Sericinae.

Members of this tribe can be identified using their mouthparts, specifically their three-jointed labium and asymmetric maxillae.

== Taxonomy ==
=== Genera ===
There are over 3000 described species in Sericini. The following genera are recognised in the tribe Sericini:

- Subtribe Astaenina Burmeister, 1855
  - Astaena Erichson, 1847
  - Miotemna Lacordaire, 1856
  - Parasymmela Pacheco, Monné, Vaz-de-Mello & Ahrens, 2022
  - Raysymmela Saylor, 1947
  - Sayloria Frey, 1975
  - Symmela Erichson, 1835
- Subtribe Sericina Kirby, 1837
  - Ahrenserica Allsopp & Schoolmeesters, 2024
  - Amiserica Nomura, 1974
  - Anomalophylla Reitter, 1887
  - Anomioserica Arrow, 1946
  - Aphenoserica Brenske, 1900
  - Apotriodonta Baraud, 1962
  - Archeohomaloplia Nikolajev, 1982
  - Archoserica Brenske, 1898
  - Blebea Lacroix, 1994
  - Calloserica Brenske, 1894
  - Camentoserica Brenske, 1900
  - Charioserica Brenske, 1899
  - Chrysoserica Brenske, 1899
  - Clypeoserica Frey, 1970
  - Comaserica Brenske, 1898
  - Conioserica Brenske, 1900
  - Corynoserica Moser, 1918
  - Cyphoserica Brenske, 1900
  - Deroserica Moser, 1915
  - Diaphoroserica Péringuey, 1904
  - Doxocalia Brenske, 1900
  - Ercomoana Lacroix, 1994
  - Eriphoserica Brenske, 1899
  - Etiserica Péringuey, 1904
  - Euphoresia Brenske, 1900
  - Euserica Reitter, 1896
  - Gastromaladera Nomura, 1973
  - Gastroserica Brenske, 1898
  - Glaphyserica Brenske, 1899
  - Glycyserica Brenske, 1899
  - Gryphonycha Péringuey, 1904
  - Gynaecoserica Brenske, 1896
  - Heteroserica Brenske, 1899
  - Homaloserica Brenske, 1898
  - Hoplomaladera Nomura, 1974
  - Hyposerica Brenske, 1898
  - Lamproserica Brenske, 1898
  - Lasioserica Brenske, 1898
  - Lepidoserica Nikolajev, 1979
  - Maladera Mulsant, 1871
  - Manoserica Moser, 1924
  - Mericserica Brenske, 1899
  - Mesoserica Brenske, 1898
  - Microserica Brenske, 1894
  - Microsericaria Nikolajev, 1979
  - Moronoserica Ahrens, Lukic & Liu, 2023
  - Nedymoserica Brenske, 1900
  - Nematoserica Arrow, 1917
  - Neomaladera Baraud, 1965
  - Neoserica Brenske, 1894
  - Nepaloserica Frey, 1965
  - Neuroserica Brenske, 1900
  - Nipponoserica Nomura, 1973
  - Omaloplia Schönherr, 1817
  - Onychoserica Moser, 1916
  - Ovoserica Frey, 1968
  - Oxyserica Brenske, 1899
  - Pachyderoserica Moser, 1920
  - Pachyserica Brenske, 1898
  - Paraserica Reitter, 1896
  - Parautoserica Lacroix, Coache & Filippi, 2022
  - Parthenoserica Brenske, 1899
  - Periserica Brenske, 1899
  - Philoserica Brenske, 1898
  - Phylloserica Brenske, 1899
  - Plaesioserica Brenske, 1899
  - Pleophylla Erichson, 1847
  - Plotopuserica Brenske, 1899
  - Plusioserica Brenske, 1899
  - Psednoserica Brenske, 1899
  - Pseudosericania Kobayashi, 1980
  - Rhynchoserica Burgeon, 1942
  - Serica MacLeay, 1819
  - Sericania Motschulsky, 1860
  - Setiserica Miyake, 2002
  - Somatoserica Brenske, 1899
  - Sphecoserica Brenske, 1899
  - Stenoserica Brenske, 1900
  - Straliga Fairmaire, 1901
  - Tamnoserica Brenske, 1899
  - Tephraeoserica Brenske, 1900
  - Teraserica Brenske, 1898
  - Tetraserica Ahrens, 2004
  - Thrymoserica Brenske, 1900
  - Trachyserica Brenske, 1899
  - Trichomaladera Nomura, 1974
  - Trioserica Moser, 1922
  - Xenoserica Ahrens, 2005
- Subtribe Trochalina Brenske, 1898
  - Ablaberoides Blanchard, 1850
  - Allokotarsa Péringuey, 1904
  - Alogistotarsa Péringuey, 1904
  - Antitrochalus Brenske, 1900
  - Aulacoserica Brenske, 1900
  - Bilga Fairmaire, 1893
  - Campylotrochalus Brenske, 1900
  - Cyrtotrochalus Brenske, 1900
  - Doleroserica Péringuey, 1904
  - Dolerotarsa Péringuey, 1904
  - Heterotrochalus Moser, 1918
  - Idaeserica Péringuey, 1904
  - Loboserica Kolbe, 1914
  - Loricatarsa Frey, 1969
  - Mesotrochalus Kolbe, 1914
  - Microtrochalus Brenske, 1900
  - Phyllotrochalus Brenske, 1900
  - Pseudotrochalus Quedenfeldt, 1884
  - Sphaerotrochalus Brenske, 1900
  - Stilbotrochalus Kolbe, 1914
  - Triacmoserica Kolbe, 1914
  - Trochaloserica Brenske, 1900
  - Trochalus Laporte, 1832
  - Xenotrochalus Moser, 1917
- Subtribe unassigned
  - Emphania Erichson, 1847
  - Hellaserica Baraud & Nicolas, 1966
  - Hetamius Fairmaire, 1893
  - Hyboserica Péringuey, 1904
  - Hymenochelus Reitter, 1890
  - Hymenoplia Eschscholtz, 1830
  - Leoserica Fabrizi, Eberle & Ahrens, 2019
  - Neosericania Miyake & Yamaya, 1994
  - Paramaladera Nomura, 1974
  - Paratriodonta Baraud, 1962
  - Pseudomaladera Nomura, 1974
  - Selaserica Brenske, 1898
  - Synacta Fairmaire, 1899
  - Triodontella Reitter, 1919
  - Trochaloschema Reitter, 1896

=== Fossil species ===
- †Cretoserica Nikolajev, 1998
  - †Cretoserica latitibialis Nikolajev, 1998
- †Lithanomala Nikolajev, 1992
  - †Lithanomala crassa (Ponomarenko, 1990)
  - †Lithanomala oblonga (Ponomarenko, 1990)
  - †Lithanomala sibirica (Ponomarenko, 1990)
- †Mioserica Zhang, 1989
  - †Mioserica margelis Zhang, 1989

=== Former genera ===
- Arraphytarsa Péringuey, 1904
