= Nepaloserica brevipes =

Scientific classification
- Kingdom: Animalia
- Phylum: Arthropoda
- Class: Insecta
- Order: Coleoptera
- Suborder: Polyphaga
- Infraorder: Scarabaeiformia
- Family: Scarabaeidae
- Genus: Nepaloserica
- Species: N. brevipes

Binomial name
- Nepaloserica brevipes Ahrens & Sabatinelli, 1996

Species of beetle

Nepaloserica brevipes is a species of beetle of the family Scarabaeidae. It is found in India (Sikkim).

== Description ==
Adults reach a length of about 9.1 mm. They have a dark reddish-brown, oval body, with short elytra.
