= Nepaloserica procera =

Scientific classification
- Kingdom: Animalia
- Phylum: Arthropoda
- Class: Insecta
- Order: Coleoptera
- Suborder: Polyphaga
- Infraorder: Scarabaeiformia
- Family: Scarabaeidae
- Genus: Nepaloserica
- Species: N. procera

Binomial name
- Nepaloserica procera Frey, 1965

Synonyms
- Nepaloserica rufescens Frey, 1965

Species of beetle

Nepaloserica procera is a species of beetle of the family Scarabaeidae. It is found in Nepal and China (Xizang).

== Subspecies ==
- Nepaloserica procera procera (Nepal and China: Xizang)
- Nepaloserica procera rufescens Frey, 1965 (Nepal)
