= Trichomaladera infortunata =

Scientific classification
- Kingdom: Animalia
- Phylum: Arthropoda
- Class: Insecta
- Order: Coleoptera
- Suborder: Polyphaga
- Infraorder: Scarabaeiformia
- Family: Scarabaeidae
- Genus: Trichomaladera
- Species: T. infortunata

Binomial name
- Trichomaladera infortunata Ahrens, 2002

Species of beetle

Trichomaladera infortunata is a species of beetle of the family Scarabaeidae. It is found in Taiwan.

== Description ==
Adults reach a length of about 13.4–14.5 mm. They have a dark to reddish brown, oblong body. The antennae are yellow and the dorsal surface (except for the shiny labroclypeus) is dull and densely covered with erect setae.
