= Deroserica pulchra =

Scientific classification
- Kingdom: Animalia
- Phylum: Arthropoda
- Clade: Pancrustacea
- Class: Insecta
- Order: Coleoptera
- Suborder: Polyphaga
- Infraorder: Scarabaeiformia
- Family: Scarabaeidae
- Genus: Deroserica
- Species: D. pulchra

Binomial name
- Deroserica pulchra Moser, 1915

Species of beetle

Deroserica pulchra is a species of beetle of the family Scarabaeidae. It is found in southern India (Madras, Malabar).

== Description ==
Adults reach a length of about 6 mm. They are dull and extensively covered with long yellowish setae on the upper surface. The head, pronotum and scutellum are blackish-green, sometimes with a faint brownish sheen. The elytra and pygidium are red. The underside is dirty brown. The frons is fairly densely covered with punctures of unequal size, the coarser of which with setae. The antennae are reddish-brown, with a blackish club. The anterior margin and the lateral margins of the pronotum are covered with long, erect setae, and the moderately densely punctate surface, particularly in the anterior half, is also covered with erect setae. The elytra have rows of punctures, with the spaces between them almost unpunctate. The lateral margins are fringed with cilia, and there are also some long setae on the surface, particularly on the posterior half of the suture.
