= Neosericania habonensis =

Scientific classification
- Kingdom: Animalia
- Phylum: Arthropoda
- Clade: Pancrustacea
- Class: Insecta
- Order: Coleoptera
- Suborder: Polyphaga
- Infraorder: Scarabaeiformia
- Family: Scarabaeidae
- Genus: Neosericania
- Species: N. habonensis

Binomial name
- Neosericania habonensis Ahrens, 2002

Species of beetle

Neosericania habonensis is a species of beetle of the family Scarabaeidae. It is found in Taiwan.

== Description ==
Adults reach a length of about 9 mm. They have a yellowish brown, oblong body. The dorsal surface is strongly shining and almost glabrous, except for a few fine hairs on the head and elytra.

== Etymology ==
The species is named after its type locality, Ha Bon mountain.
