= Leoserica capensis =

Scientific classification
- Kingdom: Animalia
- Phylum: Arthropoda
- Clade: Pancrustacea
- Class: Insecta
- Order: Coleoptera
- Suborder: Polyphaga
- Infraorder: Scarabaeiformia
- Family: Scarabaeidae
- Genus: Leoserica
- Species: L. capensis

Binomial name
- Leoserica capensis (Brenske, 1902)

Synonyms
- Serica capensis Brenske, 1902

Species of beetle

Leoserica capensis is a species of beetle of the family Scarabaeidae. It is found in South Africa (Western Cape).

== Description ==
Adults reach a length of about 8.77 mm. They have an elongate, brown, dull body. The frons is finely punctate. The pronotum is straight at the front, evenly rounded at the sides, not widening posteriorly, with broadly rounded hind angles. There is a distinctly margined posterior margin, and weak marginal setae. The scutellum is densely and coarsely punctate up to the midline. The elytra are densely and evenly punctate, without rows of punctures or intervals, with a few weakly indicated ribs. The marginal setae are fine.
