= Conioserica guineensis =

Scientific classification
- Kingdom: Animalia
- Phylum: Arthropoda
- Clade: Pancrustacea
- Class: Insecta
- Order: Coleoptera
- Suborder: Polyphaga
- Infraorder: Scarabaeiformia
- Family: Scarabaeidae
- Genus: Conioserica
- Species: C. guineensis

Binomial name
- Conioserica guineensis Frey, 1960

Species of beetle

Conioserica guineensis is a species of beetle of the family Scarabaeidae. It is found in Guinea.

== Description ==
Adults reach a length of about 9 mm. The upper and lower surfaces are dark brown, with a slight, somewhat silky sheen, and smooth without scales or setae. The dorsal surface of the pronotum has dense, even and medium-fine punctures, while the elytra have striae of punctures.
