= Emphania subsmaragdina =

Scientific classification
- Kingdom: Animalia
- Phylum: Arthropoda
- Class: Insecta
- Order: Coleoptera
- Suborder: Polyphaga
- Infraorder: Scarabaeiformia
- Family: Scarabaeidae
- Genus: Emphania
- Species: E. subsmaragdina

Binomial name
- Emphania subsmaragdina Ahrens & Fabrizi, 2008

Species of beetle

Emphania subsmaragdina is a species of beetle of the family Scarabaeidae. It is found in Madagascar.

== Description ==
Adults reach a length of about 6.9 mm. The dorsal body surface is dark green with a greenish shine, partly reddish.

== Etymology ==
The species name is derived from Latin sub (meaning dark) and smaragdinus (meaning smaragd green).
