= Aphenoserica insularis =

Scientific classification
- Kingdom: Animalia
- Phylum: Arthropoda
- Clade: Pancrustacea
- Class: Insecta
- Order: Coleoptera
- Suborder: Polyphaga
- Infraorder: Scarabaeiformia
- Family: Scarabaeidae
- Genus: Aphenoserica
- Species: A. insularis

Binomial name
- Aphenoserica insularis Moser, 1913

Synonyms
- Aphaenoserica insularis

Species of beetle

Aphenoserica insularis is a species of beetle of the family Scarabaeidae. It is found in Equatorial Guinea (Bioko).

== Description ==
Adults reach a length of about 10 mm. The upper surface is rust-brown and dull, with the pronotum more or less olive-green in the middle. The punctures of the pronotum are moderately dense, with a narrow median longitudinal band that is smooth. Most punctures have very small setae, only a few with somewhat larger bristles. The base of the elytra has fine, narrow bristle-like scales, particularly next to the scutellum, and there is a short black longitudinal band at the base of the second rib. The elytra are irregularly and finely punctured, and the punctures have very small setae. Scattered narrow scales are arranged in rows.
