= Neuroserica deffeti =

Scientific classification
- Kingdom: Animalia
- Phylum: Arthropoda
- Clade: Pancrustacea
- Class: Insecta
- Order: Coleoptera
- Suborder: Polyphaga
- Infraorder: Scarabaeiformia
- Family: Scarabaeidae
- Genus: Neuroserica
- Species: N. deffeti

Binomial name
- Neuroserica deffeti Burgeon, 1943

Species of beetle

Neuroserica deffeti is a species of scarab beetle that belongs to the family Scarabaeidae. This species is found in the Democratic Republic of the Congo.
