= Nepaloserica sankhuwasabhae =

Scientific classification
- Kingdom: Animalia
- Phylum: Arthropoda
- Class: Insecta
- Order: Coleoptera
- Suborder: Polyphaga
- Infraorder: Scarabaeiformia
- Family: Scarabaeidae
- Genus: Nepaloserica
- Species: N. sankhuwasabhae

Binomial name
- Nepaloserica sankhuwasabhae Ahrens & Sabatinelli, 1996

Species of beetle

Nepaloserica sankhuwasabhae is a species of beetle of the family Scarabaeidae. It is found in Nepal.

== Description ==
Adults reach a length of about 11–12.7 mm. They have a dark chestnut brown, elongate-oval body. The legs and the ventral surface are somewhat lighter.
