= Hoplomaladera monticola =

Scientific classification
- Kingdom: Animalia
- Phylum: Arthropoda
- Class: Insecta
- Order: Coleoptera
- Suborder: Polyphaga
- Infraorder: Scarabaeiformia
- Family: Scarabaeidae
- Genus: Hoplomaladera
- Species: H. monticola

Binomial name
- Hoplomaladera monticola Kobayashi, 1991

Species of beetle

Hoplomaladera monticola is a species of beetle of the family Scarabaeidae. It is found in Taiwan.

== Description ==
Adults reach a length of about 7.5 mm. They have an oblong-oval body which is light reddish brown above and beneath. The antennal club is blackish brown, while the margins of the middle and posterior tibiae are dark.

== Subspecies ==
- Hoplomaladera monticola monticola
- Hoplomaladera monticola anmashana Kobayashi, 2001
