= Emphania nitida =

Scientific classification
- Kingdom: Animalia
- Phylum: Arthropoda
- Clade: Pancrustacea
- Class: Insecta
- Order: Coleoptera
- Suborder: Polyphaga
- Infraorder: Scarabaeiformia
- Family: Scarabaeidae
- Genus: Emphania
- Species: E. nitida

Binomial name
- Emphania nitida Moser, 1911

Species of beetle

Emphania nitida is a species of beetle of the family Scarabaeidae. It is found in Madagascar.

== Description ==
Adults reach a length of about 6.2 mm. The dorsal body surface is dark brown with a greenish or partly reddish shine.
