= Pseudomaladera =

Scientific classification
- Kingdom: Animalia
- Phylum: Arthropoda
- Clade: Pancrustacea
- Class: Insecta
- Order: Coleoptera
- Suborder: Polyphaga
- Infraorder: Scarabaeiformia
- Family: Scarabaeidae
- Tribe: Sericini
- Genus: Pseudomaladera; Nomura, 1974

Genus of beetles

Pseudomaladera is a genus of beetles in the family Scarabaeidae.

== Species ==
- Pseudomaladera nitidifrons Nomura, 1974
