= Alogistotarsa straminea =

Scientific classification
- Kingdom: Animalia
- Phylum: Arthropoda
- Clade: Pancrustacea
- Class: Insecta
- Order: Coleoptera
- Suborder: Polyphaga
- Infraorder: Scarabaeiformia
- Family: Scarabaeidae
- Genus: Alogistotarsa
- Species: A. straminea

Binomial name
- Alogistotarsa straminea Péringuey, 1904

Species of beetle

Alogistotarsa straminea is a species of beetle of the family Scarabaeidae. It is found in South Africa (Free State).

== Description ==
Adults reach a length of about 5.5 mm. They are light straw-colour, with an iridescent sheen. The head is more or less deeply infuscate. The prothorax is fringed laterally with equi-distant bristles, and covered with fine, shallow punctures. The scutellum is faintly punctate and the elytra are striate, with the punctures on the non-convex intervals slightly rugose, and not deep.
