= Lamproserica beccarii =

Scientific classification
- Kingdom: Animalia
- Phylum: Arthropoda
- Class: Insecta
- Order: Coleoptera
- Suborder: Polyphaga
- Infraorder: Scarabaeiformia
- Family: Scarabaeidae
- Genus: Lamproserica
- Species: L. beccarii

Binomial name
- Lamproserica beccarii Brenske, 1902

Species of beetle

Lamproserica beccarii is a species of beetle of the family Scarabaeidae. It is found in Ethiopia.

== Description ==
Adults reach a length of about 5–6 mm. They have an elongated, yellow, glossy body, without an opalescent sheen. The frons is finely and densely punctate, with the vertex smooth. The short pronotum is distinctly projecting forward in the middle at the front, the sides almost straight, very slightly margined in the anterior half. The marginal setae are weak, the posterior angles are sharply angular, very finely punctate with a smooth center. On the elytra, the striae consist of a row of punctures. The intervals are slightly raised and uniformly very finely punctate with scattered, very short setae.
