= Lamproserica mombasana =

Scientific classification
- Kingdom: Animalia
- Phylum: Arthropoda
- Class: Insecta
- Order: Coleoptera
- Suborder: Polyphaga
- Infraorder: Scarabaeiformia
- Family: Scarabaeidae
- Genus: Lamproserica
- Species: L. mombasana

Binomial name
- Lamproserica mombasana Brenske, 1902

Species of beetle

Lamproserica mombasana is a species of beetle of the family Scarabaeidae. It is found in Tanzania.

== Description ==
Adults reach a length of about 6.5 mm. They are very similar to Lamproserica beccarii. They are also glossy yellow, but the clypeus is not so elongated but somewhat shorter than wide, very densely finely wrinkled-punctate with a faintly indicated elevation on the middle.
