= Loboserica gracilis =

Scientific classification
- Kingdom: Animalia
- Phylum: Arthropoda
- Clade: Pancrustacea
- Class: Insecta
- Order: Coleoptera
- Suborder: Polyphaga
- Infraorder: Scarabaeiformia
- Family: Scarabaeidae
- Genus: Loboserica
- Species: L. gracilis

Binomial name
- Loboserica gracilis Kolbe, 1914

Species of beetle

Loboserica gracilis is a species of beetle of the family Scarabaeidae. It is found in Tanzania.

== Description ==
Adults reach a length of about 7 mm (0.28 in). They have an elongated, narrow, light brown body. The clypeus is truncate anteriorly and the frons wrinkled-punctate anteriorly, weakly and sparsely punctate posteriorly. The pronotum is twice as wide as long, with the lateral margins straight posteriorly, weakly curved anteriorly, posterior angles right-angled and sharp. The entire upper surface is abundantly and moderately strongly, not densely punctate. The scutellum is longer than wide, depressed on both sides, moderately coarsely punctate. The elytra are finely striate-punctate, the striae depressed, the interstitials coarser and sparsely punctate.
