= Neuroserica fulvescens =

Scientific classification
- Kingdom: Animalia
- Phylum: Arthropoda
- Clade: Pancrustacea
- Class: Insecta
- Order: Coleoptera
- Suborder: Polyphaga
- Infraorder: Scarabaeiformia
- Family: Scarabaeidae
- Genus: Neuroserica
- Species: N. fulvescens

Binomial name
- Neuroserica fulvescens (Blanchard, 1850)

Synonyms
- Omaloplia (Emphania) fulvescens Blanchard, 1850

Species of beetle

Neuroserica fulvescens is a species of beetle of the family Scarabaeidae. It is found in Senegal.

== Description ==
Adults reach a length of about 5 mm. They are yellowish-brown and dull, with a slight silky sheen and opalescent luster. The frons is finely punctate. The pronotum is very finely and indistinctly punctate. The sides are straight, which makes its peculiar shape appear even more elongated. The elytra are distinctly ribbed. The narrow ribs are smooth and the narrow intervals more coarsely punctate.
