= Nepaloserica baglungensis =

Scientific classification
- Kingdom: Animalia
- Phylum: Arthropoda
- Class: Insecta
- Order: Coleoptera
- Suborder: Polyphaga
- Infraorder: Scarabaeiformia
- Family: Scarabaeidae
- Genus: Nepaloserica
- Species: N. baglungensis

Binomial name
- Nepaloserica baglungensis Ahrens, 2012

Species of beetle

Nepaloserica baglungensis is a species of beetle of the family Scarabaeidae. It is found in Nepal.

== Description ==
Adults reach a length of about 8.4–9.3 mm. They have a dark brown, oblong body. The legs are reddish-brown and the antennal club is yellowish brown. The dorsal surface is dull, but the labroclypeus and anterior half of the frons are shiny. There are dense hairs on the head and pronotum.

== Etymology ==
The species is named after the village of Baglung, which is located close to the type locality.
