= Sericinae =

Scientific classification
- Kingdom: Animalia
- Phylum: Arthropoda
- Clade: Pancrustacea
- Class: Insecta
- Order: Coleoptera
- Suborder: Polyphaga
- Infraorder: Scarabaeiformia
- Family: Scarabaeidae
- Subfamily: Sericinae; Kirby, 1837

Synonyms
- Homalopliadae Burmeister, 1855; Sericidae Burmeister, 1855; Sericides Lacordaire, 1855; Sericaires Mulsant, 1842

Subfamily of beetles

Sericinae is a subfamily of the scarab beetles (family Scarabaeidae). It is one of the largest subfamilies of the family.

== Tribes and subtribes ==
- Ablaberini Blanchard, 1850
- Diphucephalini Laporte, 1840
- Sericini Kirby, 1837
  - Astaenina Burmeister, 1855
  - Sericina Kirby, 1837
  - Trochalina Brenske, 1898
