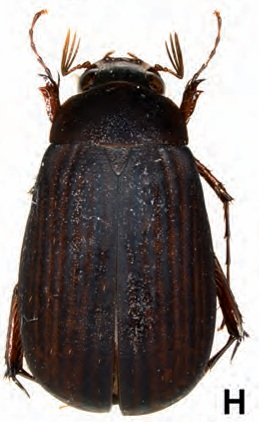

Scientific classification
- Kingdom: Animalia
- Phylum: Arthropoda
- Class: Insecta
- Order: Coleoptera
- Suborder: Polyphaga
- Infraorder: Scarabaeiformia
- Family: Scarabaeidae
- Genus: Lasioserica
- Species: L. imminuta

Binomial name
- Lasioserica imminuta Ahrens & Fabrizi, 2011

= Lasioserica imminuta =

Species of beetle

Lasioserica imminuta is a species of beetle of the family Scarabaeidae. It is found in Bhutan.

== Description ==
Adults reach a length of about 10.3 mm. They have a dark brown, oblong body. The legs, margins of the pronotum and striae of the elytra are reddish brown. The antennae are yellowish brown. The dorsal surface is dull and almost glabrous and the labroclypeus and anterior frons are shiny.

== Etymology ==
The species name is derived from Latin imminutus (meaning reduced) and refers to the narrower parameres and lateral apophysis of the aedeagus, compared to Lasioserica pacholatkoi.
