= Amiserica pseudoantennalis =

Scientific classification
- Kingdom: Animalia
- Phylum: Arthropoda
- Class: Insecta
- Order: Coleoptera
- Suborder: Polyphaga
- Infraorder: Scarabaeiformia
- Family: Scarabaeidae
- Genus: Amiserica
- Species: A. pseudoantennalis

Binomial name
- Amiserica pseudoantennalis Ahrens, Fabrizi & Liu, 2021

Species of beetle

Amiserica pseudoantennalis is a species of beetle of the family Scarabaeidae. It is found in China (Hubei, Yunnan) and Myanmar.

== Description ==
Adults reach a length of about 6.9–7.1 mm. They have a dark brown, oblong body. The antennae are yellowish brown. The dorsal surface is mostly dull and almost glabrous.

== Etymology ==
The species name is derived from Greek pseudo- (meaning false) and the name antennalis and refers to its similarity to Amiserica antennalis.
