= Lasioserica =

Scientific classification
- Kingdom: Animalia
- Phylum: Arthropoda
- Clade: Pancrustacea
- Class: Insecta
- Order: Coleoptera
- Suborder: Polyphaga
- Infraorder: Scarabaeiformia
- Family: Scarabaeidae
- Subfamily: Sericinae
- Tribe: Sericini
- Genus: Lasioserica; Brenske, 1896

Synonyms
- Orchiserica Miyake & Yamaya, 2001

Genus of leaf beetles

Lasioserica is a genus of beetles that belongs to the family Scarabaeidae.

== Taxonony ==
=== Species ===
- Lasioserica andreasi Fabrizi & Ahrens, 2020
- Lasioserica assamicola Ahrens, 2004
- Lasioserica beibengana Liu & Ahrens, 2014
- Lasioserica bipilosa Ahrens, 1999
- Lasioserica bispinosa Ahrens & Fabrizi, 2009
- Lasioserica bomansi Ahrens, 2000
- Lasioserica braeti Brenske, 1896
- Lasioserica breviclypeata Ahrens, 1999
- Lasioserica brevipilosa Moser, 1919
- Lasioserica bumthangana Ahrens, 1999
- Lasioserica chitreana Ahrens, 1999
- Lasioserica dekensis Ahrens, 1999
- Lasioserica dolakhana Ahrens, 2004
- Lasioserica dolangsae Ahrens, 2004
- Lasioserica dragon Miyake & Yamaya, 2001
- Lasioserica eusegregata Ahrens, 1996
- Lasioserica godavariensis Ahrens, 1999
- Lasioserica guangxiana Liu & Ahrens, 2017
- Lasioserica hamifer Ahrens & Fabrizi, 2011
- Lasioserica ilamensis Ahrens, 2000
- Lasioserica immatura Ahrens, 2005
- Lasioserica imminuta Ahrens & Fabrizi, 2011
- Lasioserica insularis Brenske, 1899
- Lasioserica itohi Ahrens, 2002
- Lasioserica kanpetlet Lia Botjes & Dirk Ahrens, 2026
- Lasioserica kuatunica Ahrens, 1996
- Lasioserica kubani Ahrens, 2000
- Lasioserica kulbei Ahrens, 1999
- Lasioserica latens Ahrens, 2005
- Lasioserica meghalayana Ahrens, 1999
- Lasioserica modikholae Ahrens, 1996
- Lasioserica nenya Ahrens, 1996
- Lasioserica nepalensis Ahrens, 1996
- Lasioserica nobilis (Brenske, 1894)
- Lasioserica nudosa Ahrens, 1996
- Lasioserica oblita Ahrens, 1996
- Lasioserica orlovi Ahrens, 2004
- Lasioserica pacholatkoi Ahrens, 2000
- Lasioserica petri Ahrens, 2000
- Lasioserica pilosella (Brenske, 1894)
- Lasioserica piloselloida Ahrens, 1999
- Lasioserica pseudopilosella Ahrens, 1996
- Lasioserica pudens Ahrens, 2005
- Lasioserica sabatinellii Ahrens, 1996
- Lasioserica sausai Ahrens, 2000
- Lasioserica sikkimensis Ahrens, 1996
- Lasioserica silkae Ahrens, 1996
- Lasioserica siyuanae Liu, Ahrens, Li & Yang, 2024
- Lasioserica smithi Ahrens, 2005
- Lasioserica soror Ahrens, 2004
- Lasioserica tenera (Arrow, 1946)
- Lasioserica thoracica Brenske, 1898
- Lasioserica tricuspis Ahrens, 2000
- Lasioserica tuberculiventris Moser, 1915
- Lasioserica turaensis Ahrens, 2000
- Lasioserica umbrina (Blanchard, 1850)
- Lasioserica verschraegheni Ahrens & Fabrizi, 2016
- Lasioserica victoriana Ahrens, 1996
- Lasioserica wittmeri Ahrens, 1999

=== Unknown status ===
- Lasioserica latesquamata Frey, 1975 (Bhutan)

=== Selected former species ===
- Lasioserica antennalis Nomura, 1974
- Lasioserica pilosa Moser, 1919
