= Amiserica pseudoincisa =

Scientific classification
- Kingdom: Animalia
- Phylum: Arthropoda
- Class: Insecta
- Order: Coleoptera
- Suborder: Polyphaga
- Infraorder: Scarabaeiformia
- Family: Scarabaeidae
- Genus: Amiserica
- Species: A. pseudoincisa

Binomial name
- Amiserica pseudoincisa Ahrens, Fabrizi & Liu, 2021

Species of beetle

Amiserica pseudoincisa is a species of beetle of the family Scarabaeidae. It is found in China (Guizhou).

== Description ==
Adults reach a length of about 7.2–8.5 mm. They have a brown, oblong body. The antennae are yellowish brown. The dorsal surface is mostly dull and almost glabrous.

== Etymology ==
The species name is derived from Greek pseudo- (meaning false) and the name incisa and refers to its similarity to Amiserica incisa.
