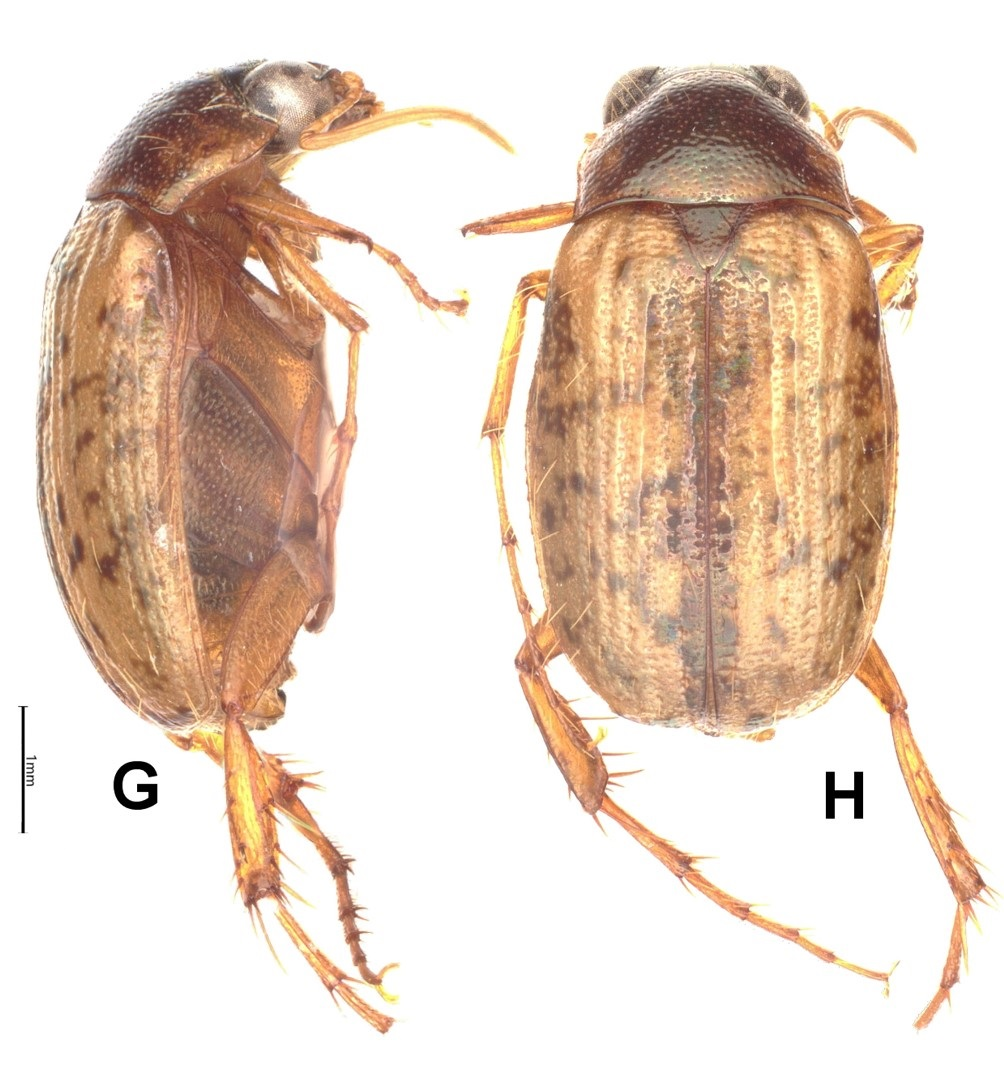
- Amiserica curvifemorata
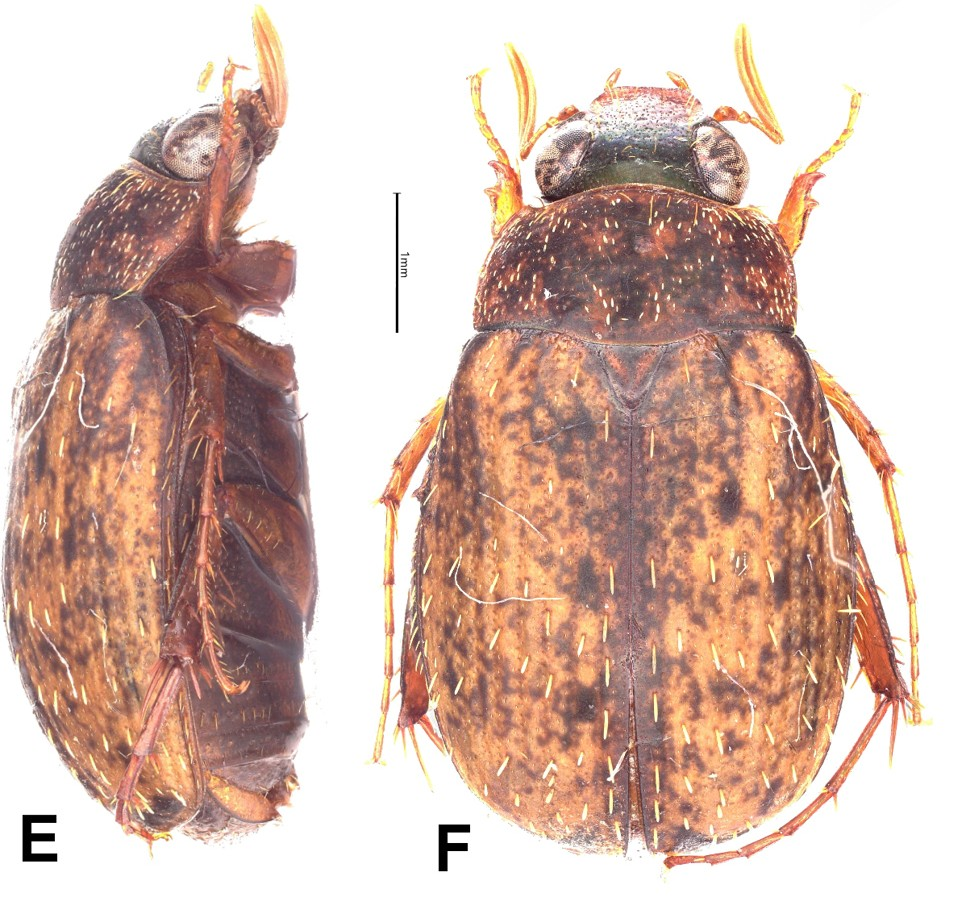
- Amiserica mogok

Scientific classification
- Kingdom: Animalia
- Phylum: Arthropoda
- Clade: Pancrustacea
- Class: Insecta
- Order: Coleoptera
- Suborder: Polyphaga
- Infraorder: Scarabaeiformia
- Family: Scarabaeidae
- Subfamily: Sericinae
- Tribe: Sericini
- Genus: Amiserica; Nomura, 1974

Type species
- Amiserica rufidula Nomura, 1974

Diversity
- 60+ species

= Amiserica =

Genus of leaf beetles

Amiserica is a genus of scarab beetles that belongs to the subfamily Sericinae.

== Distribution ==
Members of this genus can be found distributed across Asia being found in Myanmar, Thailand, Vietnam, Laos, China,Taiwan, the Himalayan regions and adjacent regions such as India, etc.

== Taxonomy ==
=== Species ===
This genus currently contains more than 60 described species. They are listed below:

- Amiserica antennalis (Nomura, 1974)
- Amiserica argentata (Frey, 1975)
- Amiserica babai Kobayashi, 1988
- Amiserica basisymmetrica Ahrens, Fabrizi & Liu, 2021
- Amiserica belousovi Ahrens, Fabrizi & Liu, 2021
- Amiserica breviflabellata Ahrens, 2004
- Amiserica carolusholzschuhi Ahrens, Fabrizi & Liu, 2021
- Amiserica chiangdaoensis Ahrens, 2003
- Amiserica costulata (Frey, 1969)
- Amiserica curvifemorata Lia Botjes & Dirk Ahrens, 2026
- Amiserica diaocangshana Ahrens, Fabrizi & Liu, 2021
- Amiserica eucurviforceps Ahrens, Fabrizi & Liu, 2021
- Amiserica fengyangensis Ahrens, Fabrizi & Liu, 2021
- Amiserica flavolucida Ahrens, 2003
- Amiserica funiushanica Ahrens, Fabrizi & Liu, 2021
- Amiserica gibbosiforceps Ahrens, Fabrizi & Liu, 2021
- Amiserica guanmenshanica Ahrens, Fabrizi & Liu, 2021
- Amiserica guizhouensis Ahrens, Fabrizi & Liu, 2021
- Amiserica gulinqin Ahrens, Fabrizi & Liu, 2021
- Amiserica hunliana Ahrens & Fabrizi, 2016
- Amiserica incisa Ahrens, Fabrizi & Liu, 2021
- Amiserica insperata (Brenske, 1898)
- Amiserica jiuhuensis Ahrens, Fabrizi & Liu, 2021
- Amiserica jizuensis Ahrens, Fabrizi & Liu, 2021
- Amiserica krausei Ahrens, 2004
- Amiserica langbianensis Ahrens, 2003
- Amiserica lii Ahrens, 2003
- Amiserica linzhouensis Ahrens, Fabrizi & Liu, 2021
- Amiserica longiflabellata Ahrens, 2004
- Amiserica longxinensis Ahrens, Fabrizi & Liu, 2021
- Amiserica lucidiflava Ahrens, Fabrizi & Liu, 2021
- Amiserica lutulenta Ahrens & Fabrizi, 2016
- Amiserica malickyi Ahrens, 2003
- Amiserica manipurensis Ahrens, 1999
- Amiserica mawphlangensis Ahrens, 1999
- Amiserica michaeli Ahrens & Fabrizi, 2011
- Amiserica mogok Lia Botjes & Dirk Ahrens, 2026
- Amiserica nahang Ahrens, Fabrizi & Liu, 2021
- Amiserica nanensis Ahrens, 2003
- Amiserica nokrekensis Ahrens, 2003
- Amiserica omeiensis Ahrens, 2003
- Amiserica panghongae Ahrens, Fabrizi & Liu, 2021
- Amiserica pappi Ahrens, Fabrizi & Liu, 2021
- Amiserica pardalis (Arrow, 1946)
- Amiserica patibilis Ahrens, 2004
- Amiserica piaoac Ahrens, Fabrizi & Liu, 2021
- Amiserica pseudoantennalis Ahrens, Fabrizi & Liu, 2021
- Amiserica pseudoincisa Ahrens, Fabrizi & Liu, 2021
- Amiserica recurva Ahrens & Fabrizi, 2009
- Amiserica rejseki Ahrens, 2003
- Amiserica rufidula Nomura, 1974 (type species)
- Amiserica sacculiforceps Ahrens, Fabrizi & Liu, 2021
- Amiserica schoedli Ahrens & Pacholátko, 2005
- Amiserica semipunctata Ahrens, 1999
- Amiserica shizumui Kobayashi, 1980
- Amiserica similissima Ahrens & Pacholátko, 2005
- Amiserica sparsesetosa Ahrens, 1999
- Amiserica strnadi Ahrens, Fabrizi & Liu, 2021
- Amiserica surda Ahrens, 2004
- Amiserica taplejungensis Ahrens, 2004
- Amiserica ventriscalptus Ahrens, Fabrizi & Liu, 2021
- Amiserica venxianensis Ahrens, Fabrizi & Liu, 2021
- Amiserica zhongtiaoshanensis Ahrens, Fabrizi & Liu, 2021
