= Amiserica breviflabellata =

Scientific classification
- Kingdom: Animalia
- Phylum: Arthropoda
- Class: Insecta
- Order: Coleoptera
- Suborder: Polyphaga
- Infraorder: Scarabaeiformia
- Family: Scarabaeidae
- Genus: Amiserica
- Species: A. breviflabellata

Binomial name
- Amiserica breviflabellata Ahrens, 2004

Species of beetle

Amiserica breviflabellata is a species of beetle of the family Scarabaeidae. It is found in India (Sikkim, Darjeeling).

== Description ==
Adults reach a length of about 5.6–6 mm. They have a light to reddish brown, oblong-oval body. The elytra are yellow-brown with dark speckles, while the head and pronotum often have a greenish metallic sheen. The upper surface, except for the head, is dull to iridescent and glabrous, except for a few hairs on the elytra.

== Etymology ==
The species name is derived from Latin brevis (meaning short) and flabellatus (meaning fanned).
