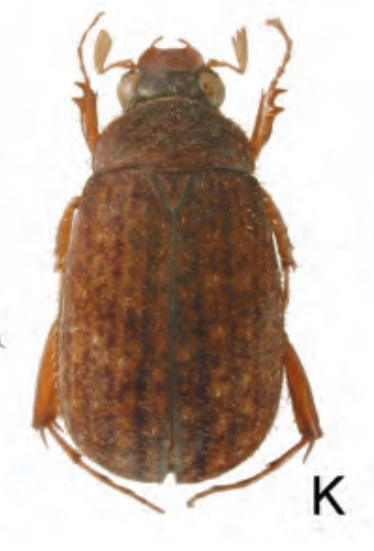

Scientific classification
- Kingdom: Animalia
- Phylum: Arthropoda
- Class: Insecta
- Order: Coleoptera
- Suborder: Polyphaga
- Infraorder: Scarabaeiformia
- Family: Scarabaeidae
- Genus: Lasioserica
- Species: L. sabatinellii

Binomial name
- Lasioserica sabatinellii Ahrens, 1996

= Lasioserica sabatinellii =

Species of beetle

Lasioserica sabatinellii is a species of beetle of the family Scarabaeidae. It is found in eastern central and eastern Nepal.

== Description ==
Adults reach a length of about 7.5-8.5 mm. They have a dark greenish-brown body. The dorsal surface is mostly dull and nearly glabrous, except for some short, white setae.

== Etymology ==
The species is named after its collector, Dr. Guido Sabatinelli.
