= Lasioserica kuatunica =

Scientific classification
- Kingdom: Animalia
- Phylum: Arthropoda
- Class: Insecta
- Order: Coleoptera
- Suborder: Polyphaga
- Infraorder: Scarabaeiformia
- Family: Scarabaeidae
- Genus: Lasioserica
- Species: L. kuatunica

Binomial name
- Lasioserica kuatunica Ahrens, 1996

Species of beetle

Lasioserica kuatunica is a species of beetle of the family Scarabaeidae. It is found in China (Fujian, Zhejiang).

== Description ==
Adults reach a length of about 7 mm. They have a dark brownish-green body and a metallic frons. The dorsal surface is mostly dull, with short, yellow setae.
