= Amiserica flavolucida =

Scientific classification
- Kingdom: Animalia
- Phylum: Arthropoda
- Clade: Pancrustacea
- Class: Insecta
- Order: Coleoptera
- Suborder: Polyphaga
- Infraorder: Scarabaeiformia
- Family: Scarabaeidae
- Genus: Amiserica
- Species: A. flavolucida

Binomial name
- Amiserica flavolucida Ahrens, 2003

Species of beetle

Amiserica flavolucida is a species of beetle of the family Scarabaeidae. It is found in India (Meghalaya, Arunachal Pradesh) and Thailand.

== Description ==
Adults reach a length of about 5.8–6.7 mm. They have a dark yellowish-brown, elongate-oval body. The elytra and margins of the pronotum are lighter, with small dark spots. The surface is shiny and iridescent and there are long hairs of the dorsal surface.
