= Lasioserica smithi =

Scientific classification
- Kingdom: Animalia
- Phylum: Arthropoda
- Class: Insecta
- Order: Coleoptera
- Suborder: Polyphaga
- Infraorder: Scarabaeiformia
- Family: Scarabaeidae
- Genus: Lasioserica
- Species: L. smithi

Binomial name
- Lasioserica smithi Ahrens, 2005

Species of beetle

Lasioserica smithi is a species of beetle of the family Scarabaeidae. It is found in India (Sikkim).

== Description ==
Adults reach a length of about 6.9 mm. They have a dark brown, oblong body. The dorsal surface is mostly dull and densely covered with short setae, interspersed with moderately dense, long setae.

== Etymology ==
The species is named in honour of a colleague of the author, Andrew Smith.
