= Amiserica lucidiflava =

Scientific classification
- Kingdom: Animalia
- Phylum: Arthropoda
- Class: Insecta
- Order: Coleoptera
- Suborder: Polyphaga
- Infraorder: Scarabaeiformia
- Family: Scarabaeidae
- Genus: Amiserica
- Species: A. lucidiflava

Binomial name
- Amiserica lucidiflava Ahrens, Fabrizi & Liu, 2021

Species of beetle

Amiserica lucidiflava is a species of beetle of the family Scarabaeidae. It is found in China (Guangdong) and Vietnam.

== Description ==
Adults reach a length of about 5.5 mm. They have a yellow, oblong body. The frons is blackish and the antennae are yellow. The surface is shiny and the dorsal surface is almost glabrous.

== Etymology ==
The species name is derived from Latin lucidus (meaning shiny) and flavus (meaning yellow) and refers to the shiny yellow body of the species.
