= Lasioserica soror =

Scientific classification
- Kingdom: Animalia
- Phylum: Arthropoda
- Class: Insecta
- Order: Coleoptera
- Suborder: Polyphaga
- Infraorder: Scarabaeiformia
- Family: Scarabaeidae
- Genus: Lasioserica
- Species: L. soror

Binomial name
- Lasioserica soror Ahrens, 2004

Species of beetle

Lasioserica soror is a species of beetle of the family Scarabaeidae. It is found in India (Darjeeling).

== Description ==
Adults reach a length of about 7.7-8.7 mm. They have a reddish-brown, oblong-oval body, partially greenish shimmering and dull except for the shiny forehead.

== Etymology ==
The species name is derived from Latin soror (meaning sister).
