= Amiserica taplejungensis =

Scientific classification
- Kingdom: Animalia
- Phylum: Arthropoda
- Class: Insecta
- Order: Coleoptera
- Suborder: Polyphaga
- Infraorder: Scarabaeiformia
- Family: Scarabaeidae
- Genus: Amiserica
- Species: A. taplejungensis

Binomial name
- Amiserica taplejungensis Ahrens, 2004

Species of beetle

Amiserica taplejungensis is a species of beetle of the family Scarabaeidae. It is found in eastern Nepal.

== Description ==
Adults reach a length of about 6.7-7.1 mm. They have a dark brown, oblong-oval body. The elytra are yellow-brown with dark speckles. The surface is dull, except for the shiny head. The upper surface is mostly hairy, but there are some glabrous patch-like areas.

== Etymology ==
The species name refers to its occurrence in the Taplejung District.
