= Lasioserica sausai =

Scientific classification
- Kingdom: Animalia
- Phylum: Arthropoda
- Class: Insecta
- Order: Coleoptera
- Suborder: Polyphaga
- Infraorder: Scarabaeiformia
- Family: Scarabaeidae
- Genus: Lasioserica
- Species: L. sausai

Binomial name
- Lasioserica sausai Ahrens, 2000

Species of beetle

Lasioserica sausai is a species of beetle of the family Scarabaeidae. It is found in Laos.

== Description ==
Adults reach a length of about 6-6.6 mm. They have a dark brown, elongate-oval body, sometimes with a reddish shimmer. The dorsal surface is mostly dull with short, yellowish-white setae.

== Etymology ==
The species is named after its collector, O. Sausa.
