= Lasioserica tuberculiventris =

Scientific classification
- Kingdom: Animalia
- Phylum: Arthropoda
- Clade: Pancrustacea
- Class: Insecta
- Order: Coleoptera
- Suborder: Polyphaga
- Infraorder: Scarabaeiformia
- Family: Scarabaeidae
- Genus: Lasioserica
- Species: L. tuberculiventris

Binomial name
- Lasioserica tuberculiventris Moser, 1915

Species of beetle

Lasioserica tuberculiventris is a species of beetle of the family Scarabaeidae. It is found in China (Guizhou, Shandong, Sichuan, Yunnan).

== Description ==
Adults reach a length of about 5.9–6.1 mm. They have a green reddish-brown body and a metallic shining frons. The dorsal surface is mostly dull, with short, yellowish-white setae.
