= Amiserica basisymmetrica =

Scientific classification
- Kingdom: Animalia
- Phylum: Arthropoda
- Class: Insecta
- Order: Coleoptera
- Suborder: Polyphaga
- Infraorder: Scarabaeiformia
- Family: Scarabaeidae
- Genus: Amiserica
- Species: A. basisymmetrica

Binomial name
- Amiserica basisymmetrica Ahrens, Fabrizi & Liu, 2021

Species of beetle

Amiserica basisymmetrica is a species of beetle of the family Scarabaeidae. It is found in Vietnam.

== Description ==
Adults reach a length of about 6.4–7.6 mm. They have a dark brown, oval body. The antennae are yellowish brown. The dorsal surface is mostly dull and almost glabrous.

== Etymology ==
The species name is derived from Latin basis (meaning base) and symmetricus (meaning symmetric) and refers to the symmetric phallobase (the base of the aedeagus).
