= Amiserica insperata =

Scientific classification
- Kingdom: Animalia
- Phylum: Arthropoda
- Class: Insecta
- Order: Coleoptera
- Suborder: Polyphaga
- Infraorder: Scarabaeiformia
- Family: Scarabaeidae
- Genus: Amiserica
- Species: A. insperata

Binomial name
- Amiserica insperata (Brenske, 1899)

Synonyms
- Lasioserica insperata Brenske, 1899

Species of beetle

Amiserica insperata is a species of beetle of the family Scarabaeidae. It is found in India (Assam, Meghalaya) and Myanmar.

== Description ==
Adults reach a length of about 5.5 mm. They have a light chestnut brown body and a metallic frons. The dorsal surface is mostly dull, with only a few thin setae.
