= Lasioserica andreasi =

Scientific classification
- Kingdom: Animalia
- Phylum: Arthropoda
- Class: Insecta
- Order: Coleoptera
- Suborder: Polyphaga
- Infraorder: Scarabaeiformia
- Family: Scarabaeidae
- Genus: Lasioserica
- Species: L. andreasi

Binomial name
- Lasioserica andreasi Fabrizi & Ahrens, 2020

Species of beetle

Lasioserica andreasi is a species of beetle of the family Scarabaeidae. It is found in Vietnam.

== Description ==
Adults reach a length of about 7–7.4 mm. They have a blackish brown and shiny, oblong body. The dorsal surface is glabrous and the antennae and legs are brown.

== Etymology ==
The species is named after its collector, Andreas Weigel.
