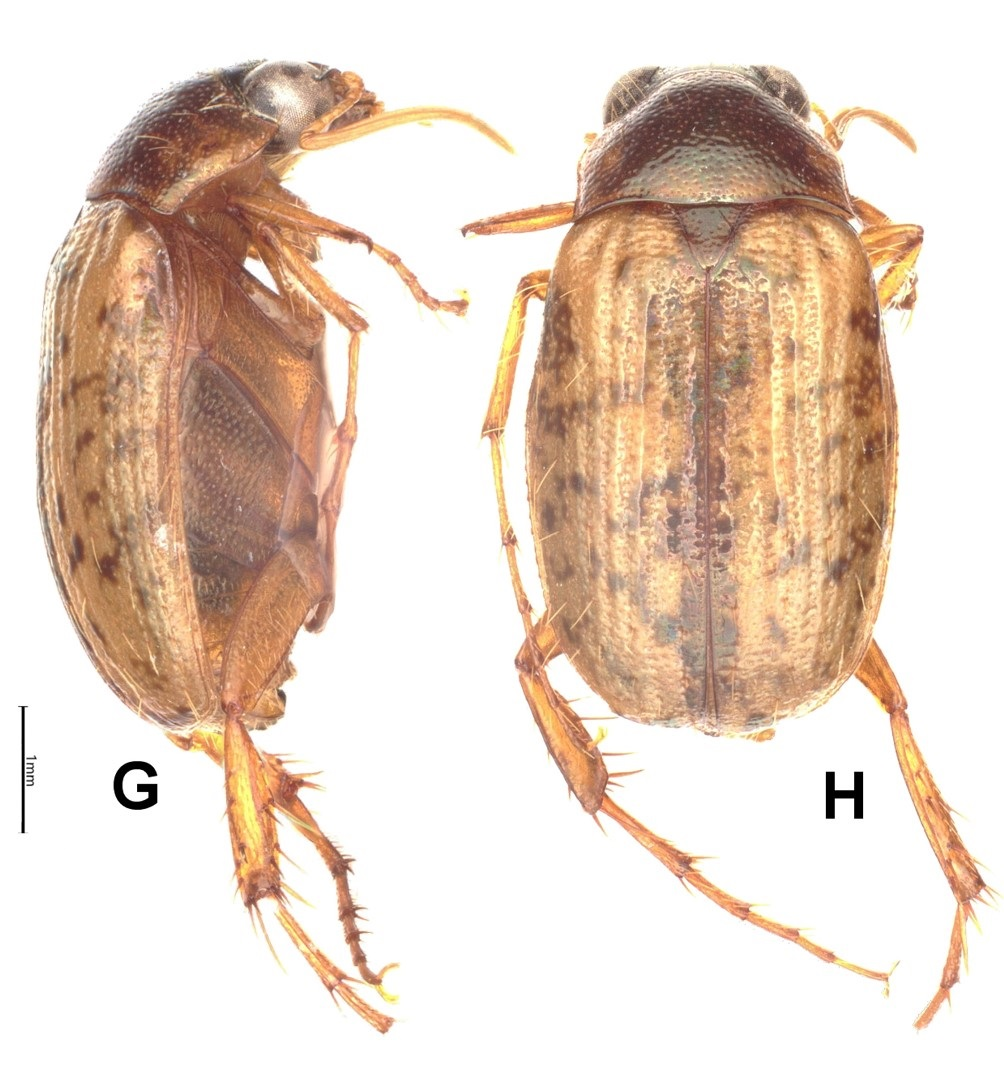

Scientific classification
- Kingdom: Animalia
- Phylum: Arthropoda
- Clade: Pancrustacea
- Class: Insecta
- Order: Coleoptera
- Suborder: Polyphaga
- Infraorder: Scarabaeiformia
- Family: Scarabaeidae
- Genus: Amiserica
- Species: A. curvifemorata

Binomial name
- Amiserica curvifemorata Lia Botjes & Ahrens, 2026

= Amiserica curvifemorata =

Species of beetle

Amiserica curvifemorata is a species of beetle of the family Scarabaeidae. It is found in Myanmar.

== Description ==
Adults reach a length of about 5.4–5.7 mm (0.21–0.22 in). They have an oblong, light brown body, while the ventral surface, head and pronotum are brown, and the elytra yellowish with numerous irregular dark spots, partly iridescent. The legs and antennae are yellow. The dorsal and ventral surface are shiny, with the dorsal surface sparsely setose, with sparse, long, erect-like setae on the elytra and pronotum.

== Etymology ==
The name of the species is derived from the combined Latin words curvus (meaning curved) and femoratus (meaning with femur).
