= Amiserica carolusholzschuhi =

Scientific classification
- Kingdom: Animalia
- Phylum: Arthropoda
- Class: Insecta
- Order: Coleoptera
- Suborder: Polyphaga
- Infraorder: Scarabaeiformia
- Family: Scarabaeidae
- Genus: Amiserica
- Species: A. carolusholzschuhi

Binomial name
- Amiserica carolusholzschuhi Ahrens, Fabrizi & Liu, 2021

Species of beetle

Amiserica carolusholzschuhi is a species of beetle of the family Scarabaeidae. It is found in Laos.

== Description ==
Adults reach a length of about 6.6–7.8 mm. They have a reddish brown, oval body. The antennae are yellowish brown. The surface is shiny and there are long setae, interspersed with short adpressed ones, on the dorsal surface.

== Etymology ==
The species is named after one of its collectors, Carolus Holzschuh.
