= Lasioserica turaensis =

Scientific classification
- Kingdom: Animalia
- Phylum: Arthropoda
- Class: Insecta
- Order: Coleoptera
- Suborder: Polyphaga
- Infraorder: Scarabaeiformia
- Family: Scarabaeidae
- Genus: Lasioserica
- Species: L. turaensis

Binomial name
- Lasioserica turaensis Ahrens, 2000

Species of beetle

Lasioserica turaensis is a species of beetle of the family Scarabaeidae. It is found in India (Meghalaya).

== Description ==
Adults reach a length of about 5.6 mm. They have a dark brown, elongate-oval body. The legs and margins of the pronotum are reddish brown. The dorsal surface is mostly dull with short, scale-like, yellowish-white setae.
