= Lasioserica assamicola =

Scientific classification
- Kingdom: Animalia
- Phylum: Arthropoda
- Class: Insecta
- Order: Coleoptera
- Suborder: Polyphaga
- Infraorder: Scarabaeiformia
- Family: Scarabaeidae
- Genus: Lasioserica
- Species: L. assamicola

Binomial name
- Lasioserica assamicola Ahrens, 2004

Species of beetle

Lasioserica assamicola is a species of beetle of the family Scarabaeidae. It is found in India (the Brahmaputra Valley).

== Description ==
Adults reach a length of about 9.6 mm. They have a reddish-brown, oblong-oval body. There are small greenish spots on the elytra and the head and pronotum are partially greenish. They are mostly dull and the upper surface is almost glabrous. There are only some fine and short hairs on the elytra.

== Etymology ==
The species is named for its occurrence in Assam.
