= Lasioserica godavariensis =

Scientific classification
- Kingdom: Animalia
- Phylum: Arthropoda
- Class: Insecta
- Order: Coleoptera
- Suborder: Polyphaga
- Infraorder: Scarabaeiformia
- Family: Scarabaeidae
- Genus: Lasioserica
- Species: L. godavariensis

Binomial name
- Lasioserica godavariensis Ahrens, 1999

Species of beetle

Lasioserica godavariensis is a species of beetle of the family Scarabaeidae. It is found in Nepal.

== Description ==
Adults reach a length of about 5.7–7.3 mm. They have a dark brown, oblong-oval body. The head is shiny and the dorsal surface is scarcely hairy.
