= Amiserica sacculiforceps =

Scientific classification
- Kingdom: Animalia
- Phylum: Arthropoda
- Class: Insecta
- Order: Coleoptera
- Suborder: Polyphaga
- Infraorder: Scarabaeiformia
- Family: Scarabaeidae
- Genus: Amiserica
- Species: A. sacculiforceps

Binomial name
- Amiserica sacculiforceps Ahrens, Fabrizi & Liu, 2021

Species of beetle

Amiserica sacculiforceps is a species of beetle of the family Scarabaeidae. It is found in China (Shaanxi).

== Description ==
Adults reach a length of about 8–9.1 mm. They have a reddish brown, oblong body. The antennae are yellowish brown. The dorsal surface is mostly dull and almost glabrous.

== Etymology ==
The species name is derived from Latin sacculus (meaning small sac) and forceps and refers to the fine membraneous sacs at the apex of the parameres.
