= Amiserica jizuensis =

Scientific classification
- Kingdom: Animalia
- Phylum: Arthropoda
- Class: Insecta
- Order: Coleoptera
- Suborder: Polyphaga
- Infraorder: Scarabaeiformia
- Family: Scarabaeidae
- Genus: Amiserica
- Species: A. jizuensis

Binomial name
- Amiserica jizuensis Ahrens, Fabrizi & Liu, 2021

Species of beetle

Amiserica jizuensis is a species of beetle of the family Scarabaeidae. It is found in China (Yunnan).

== Description ==
Adults reach a length of about 6.6–7.4 mm. They have a dirty reddish brown, oval body. The antennae are yellowish brown. The dorsal surface is dull and partly iridescent. There are long setae, interspersed with short adpressed ones, on the head, pronotum, elytra and pygidium.

== Etymology ==
The species is named after the type locality, Jizu Shan.
