= Lasioserica tenera =

Scientific classification
- Kingdom: Animalia
- Phylum: Arthropoda
- Class: Insecta
- Order: Coleoptera
- Suborder: Polyphaga
- Infraorder: Scarabaeiformia
- Family: Scarabaeidae
- Genus: Lasioserica
- Species: L. tenera

Binomial name
- Lasioserica tenera (Arrow, 1946)

Synonyms
- Serica tenera Arrow, 1946

Species of beetle

Lasioserica tenera is a species of beetle of the family Scarabaeidae. It is found in Myanmar and Vietnam.

== Description ==
Adults reach a length of about 5.9–6.1 mm. They have a chestnut brown body and a metallic frons. The dorsal surface is mostly dull, with short, yellowish-white setae.
