= Lasioserica braeti =

Scientific classification
- Kingdom: Animalia
- Phylum: Arthropoda
- Class: Insecta
- Order: Coleoptera
- Suborder: Polyphaga
- Infraorder: Scarabaeiformia
- Family: Scarabaeidae
- Genus: Lasioserica
- Species: L. braeti

Binomial name
- Lasioserica braeti Brenske, 1896

Species of beetle

Lasioserica braeti is a species of beetle of the family Scarabaeidae. It is found in India (Sikkim).

== Description ==
Adults reach a length of about 7.2 mm. They have a coppery greenish-brown body. The dorsal surface is mostly dull with some short setae.
