= Amiserica manipurensis =

Scientific classification
- Kingdom: Animalia
- Phylum: Arthropoda
- Class: Insecta
- Order: Coleoptera
- Suborder: Polyphaga
- Infraorder: Scarabaeiformia
- Family: Scarabaeidae
- Genus: Amiserica
- Species: A. manipurensis

Binomial name
- Amiserica manipurensis Ahrens, 1999

Species of beetle

Amiserica manipurensis is a species of beetle of the family Scarabaeidae. It is found in India (Manipur, Meghalaya).

== Description ==
Adults reach a length of about 5.5 mm. They have a dark brown, oblong-oval body. There are reddish brown, irregularly scattered spots on the elytra.
