= Lasioserica wittmeri =

Scientific classification
- Kingdom: Animalia
- Phylum: Arthropoda
- Class: Insecta
- Order: Coleoptera
- Suborder: Polyphaga
- Infraorder: Scarabaeiformia
- Family: Scarabaeidae
- Genus: Lasioserica
- Species: L. wittmeri

Binomial name
- Lasioserica wittmeri Ahrens, 1999

Species of beetle

Lasioserica wittmeri is a species of beetle of the family Scarabaeidae. It is found in Nepal.

== Description ==
Adults reach a length of about 6.3 mm. They have a dark brown, oblong-oval body. The dorsal surface has some dark green spots and is glabrous.

== Etymology ==
The species is named after its collector, Dr. W. Wittmer.
