= Amiserica eucurviforceps =

Scientific classification
- Kingdom: Animalia
- Phylum: Arthropoda
- Class: Insecta
- Order: Coleoptera
- Suborder: Polyphaga
- Infraorder: Scarabaeiformia
- Family: Scarabaeidae
- Genus: Amiserica
- Species: A. eucurviforceps

Binomial name
- Amiserica eucurviforceps Ahrens, Fabrizi & Liu, 2021

Species of beetle

Amiserica eucurviforceps is a species of beetle of the family Scarabaeidae. It is found in Thailand and Vietnam.

== Description ==
Adults reach a length of about 5.4–7.9 mm. They have a brown, oblong body. The antennae are yellowish brown. The dorsal surface is mostly dull and almost glabrous.

== Etymology ==
The species name is derived from Greek eu (meaning good) and Latin curvus (meaning curved) and forceps and refers to the shape of the curved right paramere.
