= Amiserica costulata =

Scientific classification
- Kingdom: Animalia
- Phylum: Arthropoda
- Class: Insecta
- Order: Coleoptera
- Suborder: Polyphaga
- Infraorder: Scarabaeiformia
- Family: Scarabaeidae
- Genus: Amiserica
- Species: A. costulata

Binomial name
- Amiserica costulata (Frey, 1969)

Synonyms
- Lasioserica costulata Frey, 1969

Species of beetle

Amiserica costulata is a species of beetle of the family Scarabaeidae. It is found in eastern-central and eastern Nepal and western Darjeeling.

== Description ==
Adults reach a length of about 6.5-6.7 mm. They have a dark brown, elongate-oval body. The elytra are yellow-brown with dark speckles. The surface is dull except for the shining head. The upper surface is mostly hairy, except for some unpunctured patch-like glabrous areas.
