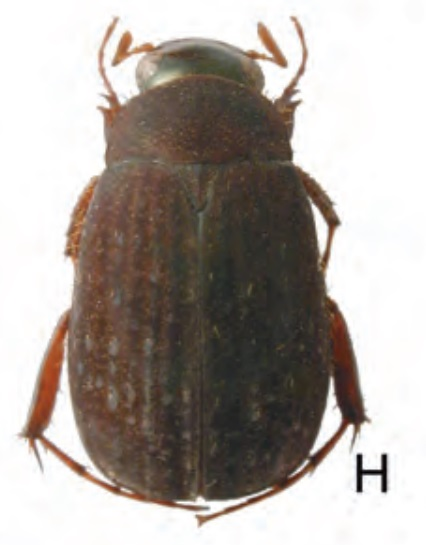

Scientific classification
- Kingdom: Animalia
- Phylum: Arthropoda
- Class: Insecta
- Order: Coleoptera
- Suborder: Polyphaga
- Infraorder: Scarabaeiformia
- Family: Scarabaeidae
- Genus: Lasioserica
- Species: L. sikkimensis

Binomial name
- Lasioserica sikkimensis Ahrens, 1996

= Lasioserica sikkimensis =

Species of beetle

Lasioserica sikkimensis is a species of beetle of the family Scarabaeidae. It is found in India (Sikkim).

== Description ==
Adults reach a length of about 7 mm. They have a dark brown to olive-green body. The dorsal surface is mostly dull, except for the head which has a metallic shine. There are short white setae on the dorsal surface.
