= Lasioserica oblita =

Scientific classification
- Kingdom: Animalia
- Phylum: Arthropoda
- Class: Insecta
- Order: Coleoptera
- Suborder: Polyphaga
- Infraorder: Scarabaeiformia
- Family: Scarabaeidae
- Genus: Lasioserica
- Species: L. oblita

Binomial name
- Lasioserica oblita Ahrens, 1996

Species of beetle

Lasioserica oblita is a species of beetle of the family Scarabaeidae. It is found in Myanmar and China (Yunnan).

== Description ==
Adults reach a length of about 5.8–6 mm. They have a dark green reddish-brown body and a metallic frons. The dorsal surface is mostly dull, with short, yellowish-white setae.
