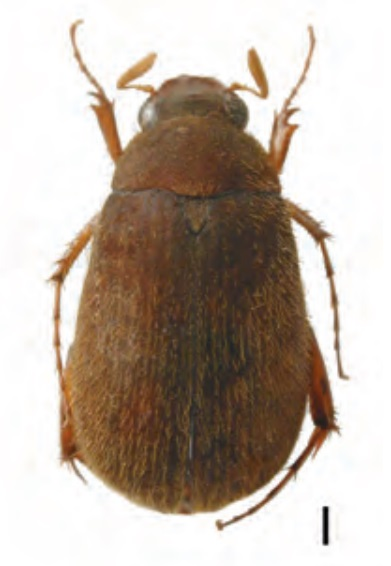

Scientific classification
- Kingdom: Animalia
- Phylum: Arthropoda
- Class: Insecta
- Order: Coleoptera
- Suborder: Polyphaga
- Infraorder: Scarabaeiformia
- Family: Scarabaeidae
- Genus: Lasioserica
- Species: L. chitreana

Binomial name
- Lasioserica chitreana Ahrens, 1999

= Lasioserica chitreana =

Species of beetle

Lasioserica chitreana is a species of beetle of the family Scarabaeidae. It is found in eastern Nepal.

== Description ==
Adults reach a length of about 6.8-7.5 mm. They have a chestnut brown, oblong-oval body. The anterior head is shiny and the dorsal surface is densely clothed with moderately long, dense, yellowish hairs.
