= Amiserica rufidula =

Scientific classification
- Kingdom: Animalia
- Phylum: Arthropoda
- Class: Insecta
- Order: Coleoptera
- Suborder: Polyphaga
- Infraorder: Scarabaeiformia
- Family: Scarabaeidae
- Genus: Amiserica
- Species: A. rufidula

Binomial name
- Amiserica rufidula Nomura, 1974

Species of beetle

Amiserica rufidula is a species of beetle of the family Scarabaeidae. It is found in Taiwan.

== Description ==
Adults reach a length of about 6.6 mm. They have a dark reddish brown, oblong body. The antennae are yellowish brown. The dorsal surface is mostly dull and almost glabrous.

== Subspecies ==
- Amiserica rufidula rufidula (Taiwan)
- Amiserica rufidula piceola Nomura, 1974 (Taiwan)
