= Lasioserica nepalensis =

Scientific classification
- Kingdom: Animalia
- Phylum: Arthropoda
- Class: Insecta
- Order: Coleoptera
- Suborder: Polyphaga
- Infraorder: Scarabaeiformia
- Family: Scarabaeidae
- Genus: Lasioserica
- Species: L. nepalensis

Binomial name
- Lasioserica nepalensis Ahrens, 1996

Species of beetle

Lasioserica nepalensis is a species of beetle of the family Scarabaeidae. It is found in Nepal.

== Description ==
Adults reach a length of about 6.7 mm. They have a dark greenish-brown body. The dorsal surface is mostly dull, except for the head which has a metallic shine. The dorsal surface is indistinctly and sparsely setose.
