= Amiserica diaocangshana =

Scientific classification
- Kingdom: Animalia
- Phylum: Arthropoda
- Class: Insecta
- Order: Coleoptera
- Suborder: Polyphaga
- Infraorder: Scarabaeiformia
- Family: Scarabaeidae
- Genus: Amiserica
- Species: A. diaocangshana

Binomial name
- Amiserica diaocangshana Ahrens, Fabrizi & Liu, 2021

Species of beetle

Amiserica diaocangshana is a species of beetle of the family Scarabaeidae. It is found in China (Shaanxi, Yunnan).

== Description ==
Adults reach a length of about 6.1–7.8 mm. They have a dirty brown, oblong body. The antennae are yellowish brown. The dorsal surface is mostly dull and almost glabrous.

== Etymology ==
The species name is derived from the type locality, Diaocang Shan.
