= Lasioserica siyuanae =

Scientific classification
- Kingdom: Animalia
- Phylum: Arthropoda
- Class: Insecta
- Order: Coleoptera
- Suborder: Polyphaga
- Infraorder: Scarabaeiformia
- Family: Scarabaeidae
- Genus: Lasioserica
- Species: L. siyuanae

Binomial name
- Lasioserica siyuanae Liu, Ahrens, Li & Yang, 2024

Species of beetle

Lasioserica siyuanae is a species of beetle of the family Scarabaeidae. It is found in China (Guangdong).

== Description ==
Adults reach a length of about 6.2–7.9 mm. They have an oblong body. The dorsal surface is dark brown, dull and full of hairs. The pronotum and head have a greenish shine and there are white setae on the elytra. The antennae are yellowish brown.

== Etymology ==
The species is named after its collector, Ms. Xu Siyuan.
