= Amiserica argentata =

Scientific classification
- Kingdom: Animalia
- Phylum: Arthropoda
- Class: Insecta
- Order: Coleoptera
- Suborder: Polyphaga
- Infraorder: Scarabaeiformia
- Family: Scarabaeidae
- Genus: Amiserica
- Species: A. argentata

Binomial name
- Amiserica argentata (Frey, 1975)

Synonyms
- Serica argentata Frey, 1975

Species of beetle

Amiserica argentata is a species of beetle of the family Scarabaeidae. It is found in Bhutan.

== Description ==
Adults reach a length of about 6–7 mm. They have a reddish to dark brown, elongate-oval body. The upper surface is shiny, with a greenish metallic sheen and with dense, long hairs.
