= Lasioserica immatura =

Scientific classification
- Kingdom: Animalia
- Phylum: Arthropoda
- Class: Insecta
- Order: Coleoptera
- Suborder: Polyphaga
- Infraorder: Scarabaeiformia
- Family: Scarabaeidae
- Genus: Lasioserica
- Species: L. immatura

Binomial name
- Lasioserica immatura Ahrens, 2005

Species of beetle

Lasioserica immatura is a species of beetle of the family Scarabaeidae. It is found in Myanmar.

== Description ==
Adults reach a length of about 7.6–7.8 mm. They have a dark brown, oval body. The dorsal surface is mostly dull and in parts densely covered with minute white scales and some glabrous spots on the elytra and pronotum. The scales are adpressed and there are a few longer scales on the odd intervals of the elytra.

== Etymology ==
The species name is derived from Latin immatura (meaning immature).
