= Lasioserica petri =

Scientific classification
- Kingdom: Animalia
- Phylum: Arthropoda
- Class: Insecta
- Order: Coleoptera
- Suborder: Polyphaga
- Infraorder: Scarabaeiformia
- Family: Scarabaeidae
- Genus: Lasioserica
- Species: L. petri

Binomial name
- Lasioserica petri Ahrens, 2000

Species of beetle

Lasioserica petri is a species of beetle of the family Scarabaeidae. It is found in Vietnam.

== Description ==
Adults reach a length of about 6.5–6.9 mm. They have a reddish brown, elongate-oval body. The dorsal surface is mostly dull with short, yellowish-white setae.

== Etymology ==
The species is named after its collector, Petr Pacholátko.
