= Lasioserica latens =

Scientific classification
- Kingdom: Animalia
- Phylum: Arthropoda
- Class: Insecta
- Order: Coleoptera
- Suborder: Polyphaga
- Infraorder: Scarabaeiformia
- Family: Scarabaeidae
- Genus: Lasioserica
- Species: L. latens

Binomial name
- Lasioserica latens Ahrens, 2005

Species of beetle

Lasioserica latens is a species of beetle of the family Scarabaeidae. It is found in Myanmar.

== Description ==
Adults reach a length of about 7.4–8.3 mm. They have a dark brown, oblong body. The dorsal surface is mostly dull and sparsely covered with moderately long setae.

== Etymology ==
The species name is derived from Latin latens (meaning hidden).
