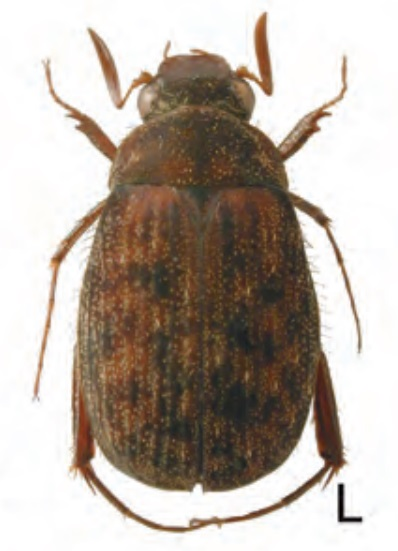

Scientific classification
- Kingdom: Animalia
- Phylum: Arthropoda
- Class: Insecta
- Order: Coleoptera
- Suborder: Polyphaga
- Infraorder: Scarabaeiformia
- Family: Scarabaeidae
- Genus: Lasioserica
- Species: L. dekensis

Binomial name
- Lasioserica dekensis Ahrens, 1999

= Lasioserica dekensis =

Species of beetle

Lasioserica dekensis is a species of beetle of the family Scarabaeidae. It is found in India (Sikkim).

== Description ==
Adults reach a length of about 6.3–7 mm. They have a dark brown, oblong-oval body, with reddish brown elytra with dark spots.
