= Amiserica gibbosiforceps =

Scientific classification
- Kingdom: Animalia
- Phylum: Arthropoda
- Class: Insecta
- Order: Coleoptera
- Suborder: Polyphaga
- Infraorder: Scarabaeiformia
- Family: Scarabaeidae
- Genus: Amiserica
- Species: A. gibbosiforceps

Binomial name
- Amiserica gibbosiforceps Ahrens, Fabrizi & Liu, 2021

Species of beetle

Amiserica gibbosiforceps is a species of beetle of the family Scarabaeidae. It is found in China (Yunnan).

== Description ==
Adults reach a length of about 7.6–8 mm. They have a reddish brown, oval body. The antennae are yellowish brown. The surface is shiny, and there are long setae, interspersed with short adpressed ones, on the head, pronotum, elytra and pygidium.

== Etymology ==
The species name is derived from Latin gibbosus (meaning with tubercles) and forceps and refers on the shape of the phallobase (base of the aedeagus) having a strong tubercle.
