= Lasioserica dolakhana =

Scientific classification
- Kingdom: Animalia
- Phylum: Arthropoda
- Class: Insecta
- Order: Coleoptera
- Suborder: Polyphaga
- Infraorder: Scarabaeiformia
- Family: Scarabaeidae
- Genus: Lasioserica
- Species: L. dolakhana

Binomial name
- Lasioserica dolakhana Ahrens, 2004

Species of beetle

Lasioserica dolakhana is a species of beetle of the family Scarabaeidae. It is found in central Nepal.

== Description ==
Adults reach a length of about 7-7.7 mm. They have a dark brown, oblong-oval body, partially greenish shimmering and dull except for the shiny forehead. The upper surface is glabrous, with only the elytra with some sparse hairs.

== Etymology ==
The species is named for its occurrence in the Dolakha District.
