= Amiserica lii =

Scientific classification
- Kingdom: Animalia
- Phylum: Arthropoda
- Class: Insecta
- Order: Coleoptera
- Suborder: Polyphaga
- Infraorder: Scarabaeiformia
- Family: Scarabaeidae
- Genus: Amiserica
- Species: A. lii

Binomial name
- Amiserica lii Ahrens, 2003

Species of beetle

Amiserica lii is a species of beetle of the family Scarabaeidae. It is found in China (Guangdong, Hunan), Laos and Vietnam.

== Description ==
Adults reach a length of about 7 mm. They have a dark reddish-brown, elongate-oval body, partly with a greenish shine. Both the pronotum and elytra have light markings. The dorsal surface (except for the weakly shining frons) is mostly dull and has single, short, erect hairs.
