= Amiserica recurva =

Scientific classification
- Kingdom: Animalia
- Phylum: Arthropoda
- Class: Insecta
- Order: Coleoptera
- Suborder: Polyphaga
- Infraorder: Scarabaeiformia
- Family: Scarabaeidae
- Genus: Amiserica
- Species: A. recurva

Binomial name
- Amiserica recurva Ahrens & Fabrizi, 2009

Species of beetle

Amiserica recurva is a species of beetle of the family Scarabaeidae. It is found in India (Arunachal Pradesh).

== Description ==
Adults reach a length of about 6.4-6.8 mm. They have a yellowish brown, oblong body. The head, disc of the pronotum and numerous small spots on the elytra are darker. The legs are reddish brown. The dorsal surface is shiny, but the pronotum and dark spots are dull. The dorsal surface is moderately covered with erect yellow setae.

== Etymology ==
The species name is derived from Latin recurva (meaning arched) and refers to shape of the left paramere.
