= Lasioserica eusegregata =

Scientific classification
- Kingdom: Animalia
- Phylum: Arthropoda
- Class: Insecta
- Order: Coleoptera
- Suborder: Polyphaga
- Infraorder: Scarabaeiformia
- Family: Scarabaeidae
- Genus: Lasioserica
- Species: L. eusegregata

Binomial name
- Lasioserica eusegregata Ahrens, 1996

Species of beetle

Lasioserica eusegregata is a species of beetle of the family Scarabaeidae. It is found in Myanmar.

== Description ==
Adults reach a length of about 6.6 mm. They have a dark greenish-brown body. The dorsal surface is mostly dull, with short, yellowish setae.
