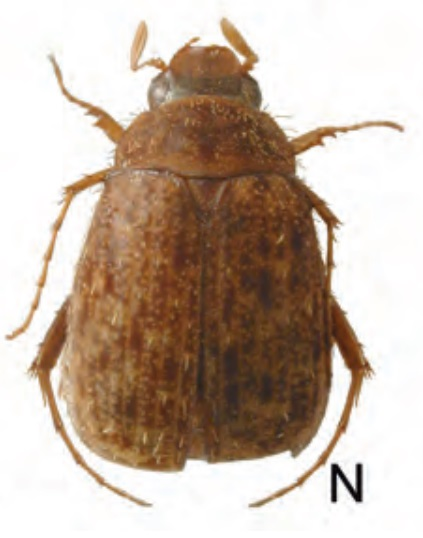

Scientific classification
- Kingdom: Animalia
- Phylum: Arthropoda
- Class: Insecta
- Order: Coleoptera
- Suborder: Polyphaga
- Infraorder: Scarabaeiformia
- Family: Scarabaeidae
- Genus: Amiserica
- Species: A. sparsesetosa

Binomial name
- Amiserica sparsesetosa Ahrens, 1999

= Amiserica sparsesetosa =

Species of beetle

Amiserica sparsesetosa is a species of beetle of the family Scarabaeidae. It is found in India (western Arunachal Pradesh, southern Sikkim) and eastern Nepal.

== Description ==
Adults reach a length of about 6.3-6.6 mm. They have a brown, short, oval body, with a greenish reflection on the frons and pronotum. The legs are reddish and the frons darker. The elytra are reddish brown with darker spots. There are short, scale-like white hairs on the surface.
