= Amiserica langbianensis =

Scientific classification
- Kingdom: Animalia
- Phylum: Arthropoda
- Class: Insecta
- Order: Coleoptera
- Suborder: Polyphaga
- Infraorder: Scarabaeiformia
- Family: Scarabaeidae
- Genus: Amiserica
- Species: A. langbianensis

Binomial name
- Amiserica langbianensis Ahrens, 2003

Species of beetle

Amiserica langbianensis is a species of beetle of the family Scarabaeidae. It is found in Vietnam.

== Description ==
Adults reach a length of about 6.1-7.1 mm. They have a brown, elongate-oval body, part of the head with a greenish shine. The elytra are light yellowish-brown with dark markings and both the pronotum and elytra have light markings. The dorsal surface is mostly dull and has single, moderately long, erect hairs.
