= Amiserica gulinqin =

Scientific classification
- Kingdom: Animalia
- Phylum: Arthropoda
- Class: Insecta
- Order: Coleoptera
- Suborder: Polyphaga
- Infraorder: Scarabaeiformia
- Family: Scarabaeidae
- Genus: Amiserica
- Species: A. gulinqin

Binomial name
- Amiserica gulinqin Ahrens, Fabrizi & Liu, 2021

Species of beetle

Amiserica gulinqin is a species of beetle of the family Scarabaeidae. It is found in China (Yunnan).

== Description ==
Adults reach a length of about 5.2–5.9 mm. They have a yellow, oblong body. The frons is blackish and the antennae are yellow. The surface is shiny and the dorsal surface is almost glabrous.

== Etymology ==
The species is named after one its type locality, Gulinqin.
