= Lasioserica bispinosa =

Scientific classification
- Kingdom: Animalia
- Phylum: Arthropoda
- Class: Insecta
- Order: Coleoptera
- Suborder: Polyphaga
- Infraorder: Scarabaeiformia
- Family: Scarabaeidae
- Genus: Lasioserica
- Species: L. bispinosa

Binomial name
- Lasioserica bispinosa Ahrens & Fabrizi, 2009

Species of beetle

Lasioserica bispinosa is a species of beetle of the family Scarabaeidae. It is found in India (Arunachal Pradesh).

== Description ==
Adults reach a length of about 6.9 mm. They have a dark brown, oblong body. The dorsal surface is mostly dull and sparsely covered with white setae.

== Etymology ==
The species name is derived from Latin bispinosus (meaning with two horns) and refers to shape of the dorsal apophysis of the aedeagus.
