= Lasioserica bomansi =

Scientific classification
- Kingdom: Animalia
- Phylum: Arthropoda
- Class: Insecta
- Order: Coleoptera
- Suborder: Polyphaga
- Infraorder: Scarabaeiformia
- Family: Scarabaeidae
- Genus: Lasioserica
- Species: L. bomansi

Binomial name
- Lasioserica bomansi Ahrens, 2000

Species of beetle

Lasioserica bomansi is a species of beetle of the family Scarabaeidae. It is found in Thailand.

== Description ==
Adults reach a length of about 4.9–5.3 mm. They have a reddish brown, oblong body. The dorsal surface is mostly dull with yellowish-white setae.

== Etymology ==
The species is named after its collector, H. E. Bomans.
