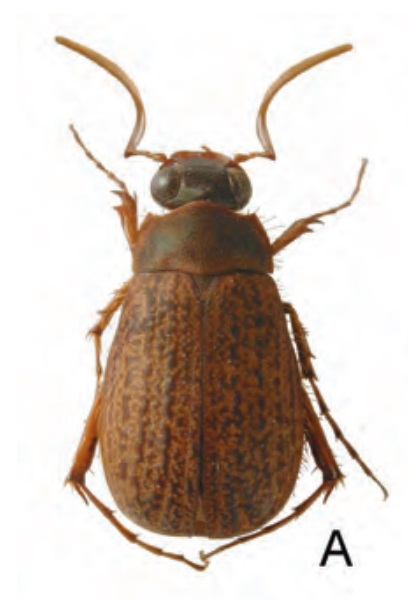

Scientific classification
- Kingdom: Animalia
- Phylum: Arthropoda
- Class: Insecta
- Order: Coleoptera
- Suborder: Polyphaga
- Infraorder: Scarabaeiformia
- Family: Scarabaeidae
- Genus: Amiserica
- Species: A. longiflabellata

Binomial name
- Amiserica longiflabellata Ahrens, 2004

= Amiserica longiflabellata =

Species of beetle

Amiserica longiflabellata is a species of beetle of the family Scarabaeidae. It is found in India (Sikkim).

== Description ==
Adults reach a length of about 5.6 mm. They have a light to reddish brown, oblong-oval body. The unpunctured areas of the elytra are dark, sometimes speckled and the head and pronotum often have a greenish metallic sheen. The upper surface, except for the head, is dull to iridescently shiny and glabrous except for a few some hairs on the elytra.

== Etymology ==
The species name is derived from Latin longus (meaning long) and flabellatus (meaning fanned).
