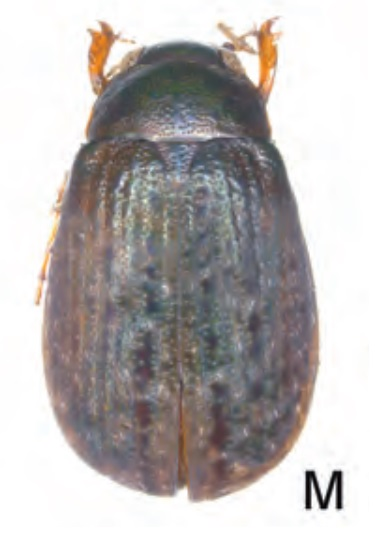

Scientific classification
- Kingdom: Animalia
- Phylum: Arthropoda
- Class: Insecta
- Order: Coleoptera
- Suborder: Polyphaga
- Infraorder: Scarabaeiformia
- Family: Scarabaeidae
- Genus: Lasioserica
- Species: L. verschraegheni

Binomial name
- Lasioserica verschraegheni Ahrens & Fabrizi, 2016

= Lasioserica verschraegheni =

Species of beetle

Lasioserica verschraegheni is a species of beetle of the family Scarabaeidae. It is found in India (Darjeeling).

== Description ==
Adults reach a length of about 7–7.5 mm. They have a dark brown and dull, oblong body. The antenna are yellowish brown and the part of the dorsal surface has a greenish shine. There are white, scale-like setae on the elytra and pronotum.

== Etymology ==
The species is named for its collector, Mr. Verschraeghen.
