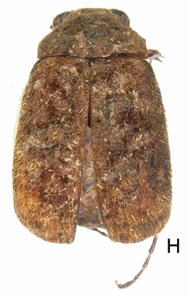

Scientific classification
- Kingdom: Animalia
- Phylum: Arthropoda
- Class: Insecta
- Order: Coleoptera
- Suborder: Polyphaga
- Infraorder: Scarabaeiformia
- Family: Scarabaeidae
- Genus: Lasioserica
- Species: L. guangxiana

Binomial name
- Lasioserica guangxiana Liu & Ahrens, 2017

= Lasioserica guangxiana =

Species of beetle

Lasioserica guangxiana is a species of beetle of the family Scarabaeidae. It is found in China (Guangxi).

== Description ==
Adults reach a length of about 6–6.8 mm. They have an oblong body. The dorsal surface is dark brown and the antennae are brown. The dorsal surface is dull (the pronotum and head with a greenish shine) and densely setose, with fine long and white, robust setae on the elytra.

== Etymology ==
The species is named after its occurrence in the Guangxi province.
