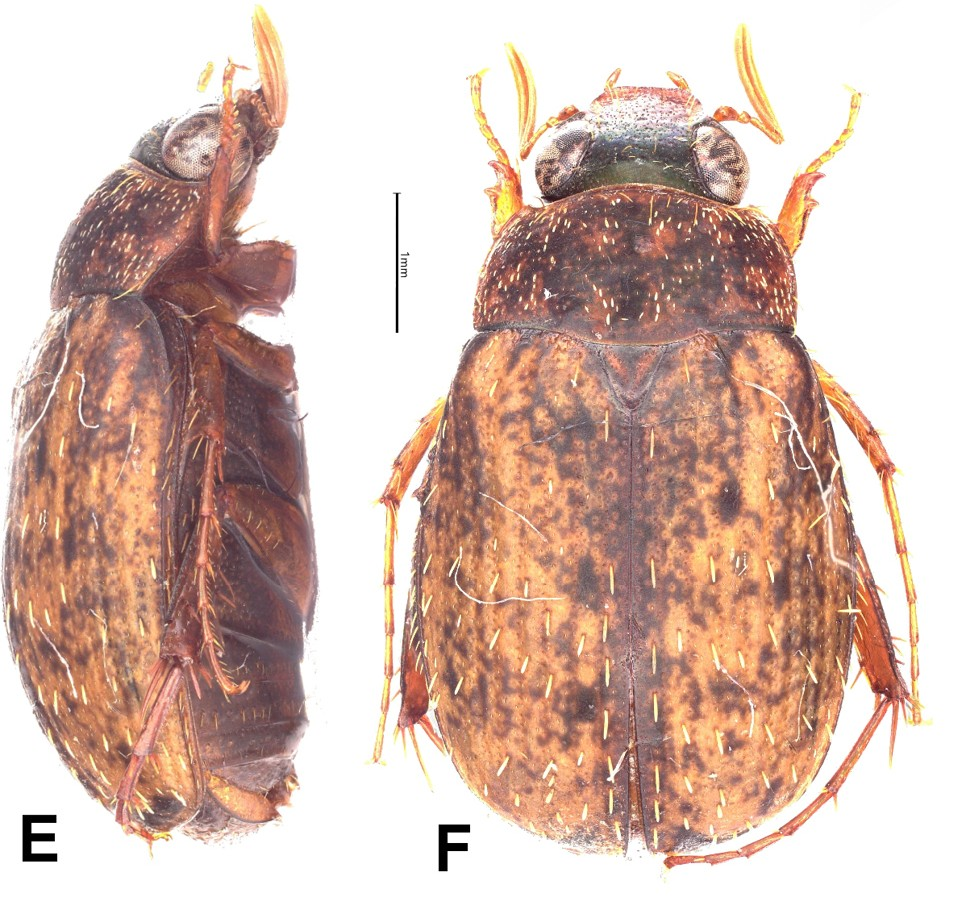

Scientific classification
- Kingdom: Animalia
- Phylum: Arthropoda
- Clade: Pancrustacea
- Class: Insecta
- Order: Coleoptera
- Suborder: Polyphaga
- Infraorder: Scarabaeiformia
- Family: Scarabaeidae
- Genus: Amiserica
- Species: A. mogok

Binomial name
- Amiserica mogok Lia Botjes & Ahrens, 2026

= Amiserica mogok =

Species of beetle

Amiserica mogok is a species of beetle of the family Scarabaeidae. It is found in Myanmar.

== Description ==
Adults reach a length of about 5.6 mm (0.22 in). They have an oblong, dull, dark brown body. The pronotum and elytra have numerous irregular yellow spots. The antennae are yellow and the legs reddish brown. The dorsal surface is moderately densely setose, with short, scale-like setae on the pronotum and robust, long, erect, light brown setae on the elytra.

== Etymology ==
The species is named after its occurrence close to Mogok.
