= Lasioserica bumthangana =

Scientific classification
- Kingdom: Animalia
- Phylum: Arthropoda
- Class: Insecta
- Order: Coleoptera
- Suborder: Polyphaga
- Infraorder: Scarabaeiformia
- Family: Scarabaeidae
- Genus: Lasioserica
- Species: L. bumthangana

Binomial name
- Lasioserica bumthangana Ahrens, 1999

Species of beetle

Lasioserica bumthangana is a species of beetle of the family Scarabaeidae. It is found in Bhutan.

== Description ==
Adults reach a length of about 8.3 mm. They have a chestnut brown, oblong body. The dorsal surface is mostly dull and is densely clothed with moderately long, dense, yellowish hairs.
