= Lasioserica brevipilosa =

Scientific classification
- Kingdom: Animalia
- Phylum: Arthropoda
- Clade: Pancrustacea
- Class: Insecta
- Order: Coleoptera
- Suborder: Polyphaga
- Infraorder: Scarabaeiformia
- Family: Scarabaeidae
- Genus: Lasioserica
- Species: L. brevipilosa

Binomial name
- Lasioserica brevipilosa Moser, 1919

Species of beetle

Lasioserica brevipilosa is a species of beetle of the family Scarabaeidae. It is found in China (Guizhou, Sichuan, Yunnan).

== Description ==
Adults reach a length of about 6.1 mm. They have a chestnut body and a metallic shining frons. The dorsal surface is mostly dull, with short, yellowish-white setae.
