= Lasioserica nenya =

Scientific classification
- Kingdom: Animalia
- Phylum: Arthropoda
- Class: Insecta
- Order: Coleoptera
- Suborder: Polyphaga
- Infraorder: Scarabaeiformia
- Family: Scarabaeidae
- Genus: Lasioserica
- Species: L. nenya

Binomial name
- Lasioserica nenya Ahrens, 1996

Species of beetle

Lasioserica nenya is a species of beetle of the family Scarabaeidae. It is found in India (Assam, Meghalaya) and Thailand.

== Description ==
Adults reach a length of about 6-6.5 mm. They have a dark brown body, with a somewhat metallic greenish tinge. The dorsal surface is sparsely covered with short setae.
