= Lasioserica dragon =

Scientific classification
- Kingdom: Animalia
- Phylum: Arthropoda
- Class: Insecta
- Order: Coleoptera
- Suborder: Polyphaga
- Infraorder: Scarabaeiformia
- Family: Scarabaeidae
- Genus: Lasioserica
- Species: L. dragon

Binomial name
- Lasioserica dragon Miyake & Yamaya, 2001

Species of beetle

Lasioserica dragon is a species of beetle of the family Scarabaeidae. It is found in China (Sichuan, Yunnan).
