= Amiserica similissima =

Scientific classification
- Kingdom: Animalia
- Phylum: Arthropoda
- Class: Insecta
- Order: Coleoptera
- Suborder: Polyphaga
- Infraorder: Scarabaeiformia
- Family: Scarabaeidae
- Genus: Amiserica
- Species: A. similissima

Binomial name
- Amiserica similissima Ahrens & Pacholátko, 2005

Species of beetle

Amiserica similissima is a species of beetle of the family Scarabaeidae. It is found in India (Meghalaya).

== Description ==
Adults reach a length of about 5.6–7 mm. They have a dark yellowish-brown, elongate-oval body, with the margins of the pronotum and elytra lighter and with small dark spots. The dorsal surface is shiny iridescent, with single, long, erect hairs.

== Etymology ==
The species name is derived from Latin similissimus (meaning very similar).
