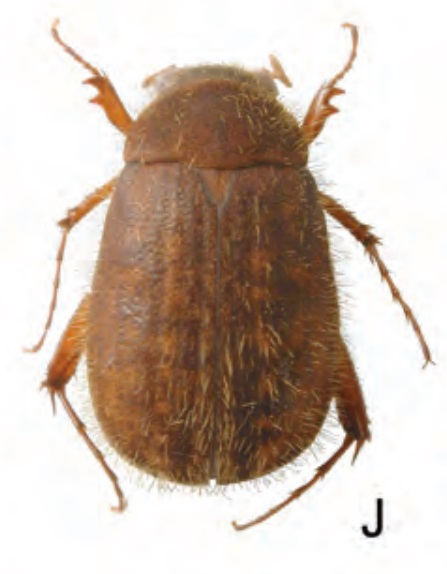

Scientific classification
- Kingdom: Animalia
- Phylum: Arthropoda
- Class: Insecta
- Order: Coleoptera
- Suborder: Polyphaga
- Infraorder: Scarabaeiformia
- Family: Scarabaeidae
- Genus: Lasioserica
- Species: L. umbrina

Binomial name
- Lasioserica umbrina (Blanchard, 1850)

Synonyms
- Omaloplia umbrina Blanchard, 1850; Serica maculata Brenske, 1894; Lasioserica pilosa Moser, 1919; Lasioserica bhutanica Ahrens, 1996; Lasioserica galadrielae Ahrens, 1996; Lasioserica jiriana Ahrens, 1996

= Lasioserica umbrina =

Species of beetle

Lasioserica umbrina is a species of beetle of the family Scarabaeidae. It is found in Nepal, Bhutan and India (Sikkim, Darjeeling).

== Description ==
Adults reach a length of about 6–7 mm. They have a dark reddish-brown body, with lighter punctures. The dorsal surface is mostly dull and setose.

== Subspecies ==
- Lasioserica umbrina umbrina (Himalaya, from east of the Sutlej river to the Kathmandu valley in central Nepal)
- Lasioserica umbrina bhutanica Ahrens, 1996 (Bhutan)
- Lasioserica umbrina galadrielae Ahrens, 1996 (western Sikkim, eastern Nepal and the Darjeeling area)
- Lasioserica umbrina jiriana Ahrens, 1996 (eastern central Nepal)
