= Lasioserica kubani =

Scientific classification
- Kingdom: Animalia
- Phylum: Arthropoda
- Class: Insecta
- Order: Coleoptera
- Suborder: Polyphaga
- Infraorder: Scarabaeiformia
- Family: Scarabaeidae
- Genus: Lasioserica
- Species: L. kubani

Binomial name
- Lasioserica kubani Ahrens, 2000

Species of beetle

Lasioserica kubani is a species of beetle of the family Scarabaeidae. It is found in Thailand and China (Yunnan).

== Description ==
Adults reach a length of about 5.5–5.9 mm. They have a reddish brown, oblong body. The dorsal surface is mostly dull with short, yellowish-white setae.

== Etymology ==
The species is named after one of its collectors, Vít Kubáò.
