= Amiserica nokrekensis =

Scientific classification
- Kingdom: Animalia
- Phylum: Arthropoda
- Class: Insecta
- Order: Coleoptera
- Suborder: Polyphaga
- Infraorder: Scarabaeiformia
- Family: Scarabaeidae
- Genus: Amiserica
- Species: A. nokrekensis

Binomial name
- Amiserica nokrekensis Ahrens, 2003

Species of beetle

Amiserica nokrekensis is a species of beetle of the family Scarabaeidae. It is found in India (Meghalaya) and Vietnam.

== Description ==
Adults reach a length of about 5.6–6.8 mm. They have a brown, elongate-oval body, partly with a greenish shine. The elytra are light yellowish brown and both the pronotum and elytra have light markings. The dorsal surface is mostly dull (except for the weak shiny frons) and has somewhat long, erect hairs.
