= Lasioserica silkae =

Scientific classification
- Kingdom: Animalia
- Phylum: Arthropoda
- Class: Insecta
- Order: Coleoptera
- Suborder: Polyphaga
- Infraorder: Scarabaeiformia
- Family: Scarabaeidae
- Genus: Lasioserica
- Species: L. silkae

Binomial name
- Lasioserica silkae Ahrens, 1996

Species of beetle

Lasioserica silkae is a species of beetle of the family Scarabaeidae. It is found in Nepal.

== Description ==
Adults reach a length of about 6.2–7.3 mm. They have a speckled dark greenish-brown body. The dorsal surface is mostly dull and with dense long setae.

== Etymology ==
The species is named after the sister of the author, Silke.
