= Amiserica venxianensis =

Scientific classification
- Kingdom: Animalia
- Phylum: Arthropoda
- Class: Insecta
- Order: Coleoptera
- Suborder: Polyphaga
- Infraorder: Scarabaeiformia
- Family: Scarabaeidae
- Genus: Amiserica
- Species: A. venxianensis

Binomial name
- Amiserica venxianensis Ahrens, Fabrizi & Liu, 2021

Species of beetle

Amiserica venxianensis is a species of beetle of the family Scarabaeidae. It is found in China (Gansu, Shaanxi).

== Description ==
Adults reach a length of about 6.9–7.8 mm. They have a dark reddish brown, oblong body. The antennae are yellowish brown. The surface is shiny and the dorsal surface is almost glabrous.

== Etymology ==
The species is named after one its type locality, Venxian.
