= Lasioserica modikholae =

Scientific classification
- Kingdom: Animalia
- Phylum: Arthropoda
- Class: Insecta
- Order: Coleoptera
- Suborder: Polyphaga
- Infraorder: Scarabaeiformia
- Family: Scarabaeidae
- Genus: Lasioserica
- Species: L. modikholae

Binomial name
- Lasioserica modikholae Ahrens, 1996

Species of beetle

Lasioserica modikholae is a species of beetle of the family Scarabaeidae. It is found in Nepal.

== Description ==
Adults reach a length of about 7 mm. They have a dark brown body, with a somewhat greenish shine. The dorsal surface is mostly dull and nearly glabrous, except for some single short setae.
