= Lasioserica ilamensis =

Scientific classification
- Kingdom: Animalia
- Phylum: Arthropoda
- Class: Insecta
- Order: Coleoptera
- Suborder: Polyphaga
- Infraorder: Scarabaeiformia
- Family: Scarabaeidae
- Genus: Lasioserica
- Species: L. ilamensis

Binomial name
- Lasioserica ilamensis Ahrens, 2000

Species of beetle

Lasioserica ilamensis is a species of beetle of the family Scarabaeidae. It is found in Nepal.

== Description ==
Adults reach a length of about 7.7 mm. They have a reddish brown, elongate-oval body. The dorsal surface is mostly dull with short, yellowish-white setae.
