= Amiserica funiushanica =

Scientific classification
- Kingdom: Animalia
- Phylum: Arthropoda
- Class: Insecta
- Order: Coleoptera
- Suborder: Polyphaga
- Infraorder: Scarabaeiformia
- Family: Scarabaeidae
- Genus: Amiserica
- Species: A. funiushanica

Binomial name
- Amiserica funiushanica Ahrens, Fabrizi & Liu, 2021

Species of beetle

Amiserica funiushanica is a species of beetle of the family Scarabaeidae. It is found in China (Guizhou, Hebei, Henan).

== Description ==
Adults reach a length of about 7–7.8 mm. They have a reddish brown, oblong body. The antennae are yellowish brown. The dorsal surface is mostly dull and almost glabrous.

== Etymology ==
The species name is derived from the type locality, Funiu Shan.
