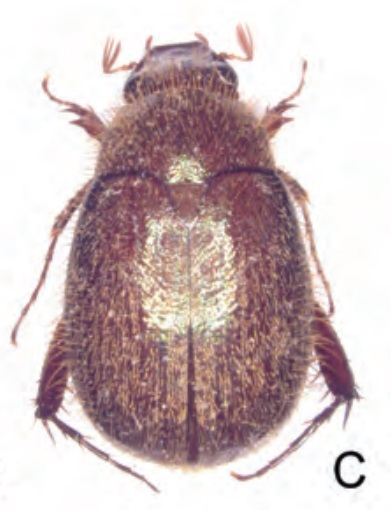

Scientific classification
- Kingdom: Animalia
- Phylum: Arthropoda
- Class: Insecta
- Order: Coleoptera
- Suborder: Polyphaga
- Infraorder: Scarabaeiformia
- Family: Scarabaeidae
- Genus: Amiserica
- Species: A. lutulenta

Binomial name
- Amiserica lutulenta Ahrens & Fabrizi, 2016

= Amiserica lutulenta =

Species of beetle

Amiserica lutulenta is a species of beetle of the family Scarabaeidae. It is found in north-eastern India.

== Description ==
Adults reach a length of about 6.2–6.6 mm. They have a dark reddish brown, egg-shaped body with a greenish-iridescent shine. The surface is shiny and the antenna are yellowish brown. There are many setae on the head, pronotum and elytra.

== Etymology ==
The species name is derived from Latin lutulentus (meaning stained or dirtied with something).
