= Lasioserica tricuspis =

Scientific classification
- Kingdom: Animalia
- Phylum: Arthropoda
- Class: Insecta
- Order: Coleoptera
- Suborder: Polyphaga
- Infraorder: Scarabaeiformia
- Family: Scarabaeidae
- Genus: Lasioserica
- Species: L. tricuspis

Binomial name
- Lasioserica tricuspis Ahrens, 2000

Species of beetle

Lasioserica tricuspis is a species of beetle of the family Scarabaeidae. It is found in Laos, Thailand and China (Guangxi).

== Description ==
Adults reach a length of about 4.8–5.9 mm. They have a reddish brown, oblong body. The dorsal surface is mostly dull with short, yellowish-white setae.
