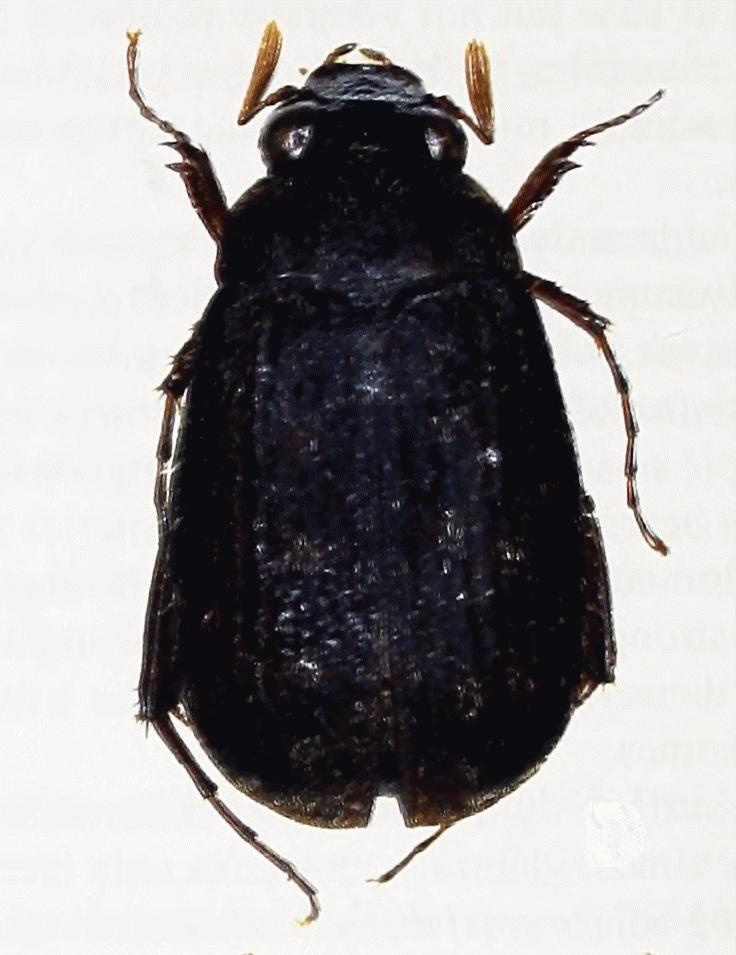

Scientific classification
- Kingdom: Animalia
- Phylum: Arthropoda
- Class: Insecta
- Order: Coleoptera
- Suborder: Polyphaga
- Infraorder: Scarabaeiformia
- Family: Scarabaeidae
- Genus: Lasioserica
- Species: L. hamifer

Binomial name
- Lasioserica hamifer Ahrens & Fabrizi, 2011

= Lasioserica hamifer =

Species of beetle

Lasioserica hamifer is a species of beetle of the family Scarabaeidae. It is found in Bhutan.

== Description ==
Adults reach a length of about 5.9 mm. They have a dark brown, oblong body. The antennae are yellowish brown and the dorsal surface is dull, although the labroclypeus and anterior frons are shiny. The dorsal surface is densely covered with small white setae.

== Etymology ==
The species name is derived from Latin hamifer (meaning bearing a hook).
