= Amiserica shizumui =

Scientific classification
- Kingdom: Animalia
- Phylum: Arthropoda
- Class: Insecta
- Order: Coleoptera
- Suborder: Polyphaga
- Infraorder: Scarabaeiformia
- Family: Scarabaeidae
- Genus: Amiserica
- Species: A. shizumui

Binomial name
- Amiserica shizumui Kobayashi, 1980

Species of beetle

Amiserica shizumui is a species of beetle of the family Scarabaeidae. It is found in Taiwan.
