= Amiserica ventriscalptus =

Scientific classification
- Kingdom: Animalia
- Phylum: Arthropoda
- Class: Insecta
- Order: Coleoptera
- Suborder: Polyphaga
- Infraorder: Scarabaeiformia
- Family: Scarabaeidae
- Genus: Amiserica
- Species: A. ventriscalptus

Binomial name
- Amiserica ventriscalptus Ahrens, Fabrizi & Liu, 2021

Species of beetle

Amiserica ventriscalptus is a species of beetle of the family Scarabaeidae. It is found in China (Yunnan).

== Description ==
Adults reach a length of about 7.2–9.1 mm. They have a reddish brown, oval body. The antennae are yellowish brown. The surface is shiny and there are long setae, interspersed with short adpressed ones, on the dorsal surface.

== Etymology ==
The species name is derived from Latin ventris- (meaning venter) and scalptus (meaning incised) and refers to the deeply incised ventral portion of the phallobase (before the left paramere).
