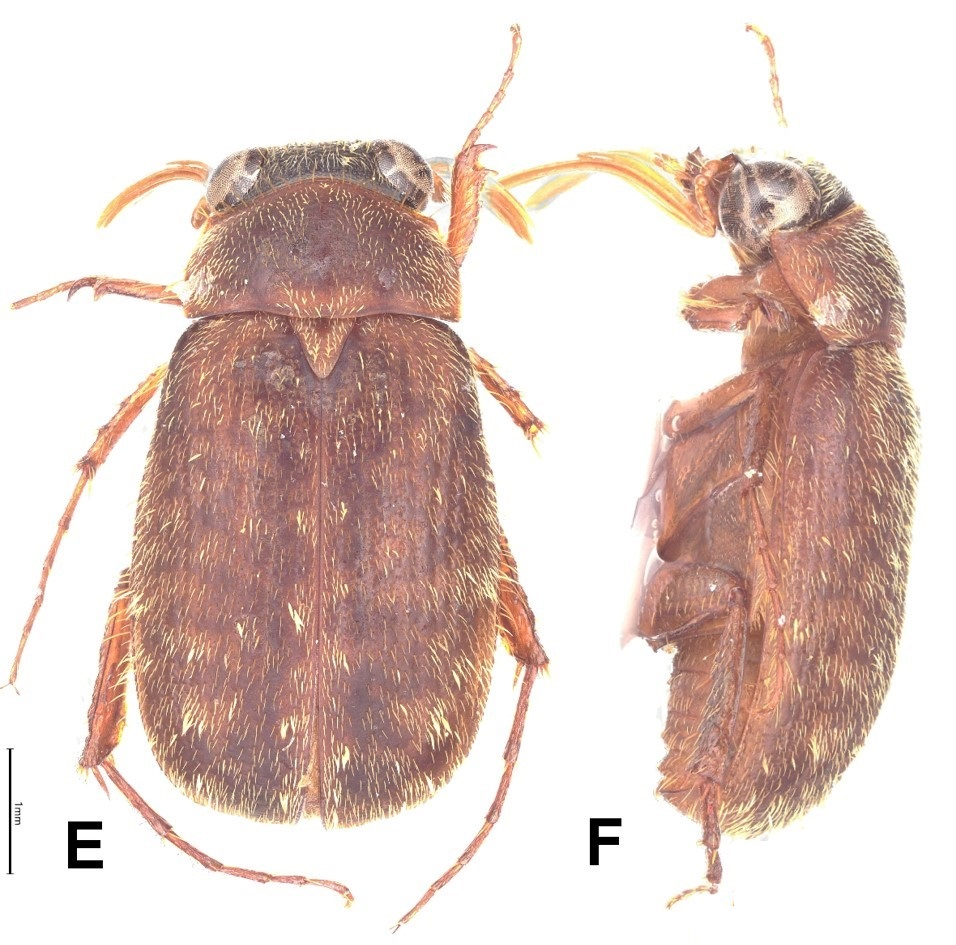

Scientific classification
- Kingdom: Animalia
- Phylum: Arthropoda
- Clade: Pancrustacea
- Class: Insecta
- Order: Coleoptera
- Suborder: Polyphaga
- Infraorder: Scarabaeiformia
- Family: Scarabaeidae
- Genus: Lasioserica
- Species: L. kanpetlet

Binomial name
- Lasioserica kanpetlet Lia Botjes & Ahrens, 2026

= Lasioserica kanpetlet =

Species of beetle

Lasioserica kanpetlet is a species of beetle of the family Scarabaeidae. It is found in Myanmar.

== Description ==
Adults reach a length of about 5.5–5.6 mm (0.22–0.22 in). They have an oblong body. The dorsal surface is brown, with the frons darker and the antennae yellow. The dorsal surface is dull, the labroclypeus shiny, and the pronotum and head have a weak greenish shine. The entire surface is densely setose, with fine, moderately long and yellow setae, and on elytra additionally with a few larger, white, scale-like setae.

== Etymology ==
The species is named after its type locality, Kanpetlet.
