= Lasioserica bipilosa =

Scientific classification
- Kingdom: Animalia
- Phylum: Arthropoda
- Class: Insecta
- Order: Coleoptera
- Suborder: Polyphaga
- Infraorder: Scarabaeiformia
- Family: Scarabaeidae
- Genus: Lasioserica
- Species: L. bipilosa

Binomial name
- Lasioserica bipilosa Ahrens, 1999

Species of beetle

Lasioserica bipilosa is a species of beetle of the family Scarabaeidae. It is found in Vietnam.

== Description ==
Adults reach a length of about 5.9–6.1 mm. They have a reddish brown, short, oval body. The dorsal surface is mostly dull with yellowish-white setae.
