= Lasioserica orlovi =

Scientific classification
- Kingdom: Animalia
- Phylum: Arthropoda
- Class: Insecta
- Order: Coleoptera
- Suborder: Polyphaga
- Infraorder: Scarabaeiformia
- Family: Scarabaeidae
- Genus: Lasioserica
- Species: L. orlovi

Binomial name
- Lasioserica orlovi Ahrens, 2004

Species of beetle

Lasioserica orlovi is a species of beetle of the family Scarabaeidae. It is found in eastern Nepal.

== Description ==
Adults reach a length of about 6.9 mm. They have a dark brown, oblong-oval body, partially greenish shimmering and dull except for the shiny forehead.

== Etymology ==
The species is named for N.L. Orlov, the collector of the species.
