= Lasioserica nudosa =

Scientific classification
- Kingdom: Animalia
- Phylum: Arthropoda
- Class: Insecta
- Order: Coleoptera
- Suborder: Polyphaga
- Infraorder: Scarabaeiformia
- Family: Scarabaeidae
- Genus: Lasioserica
- Species: L. nudosa

Binomial name
- Lasioserica nudosa Ahrens, 1996

Species of beetle

Lasioserica nudosa is a species of beetle of the family Scarabaeidae. It is found in Nepal.

== Description ==
Adults reach a length of about 6.8 mm. They have a dark reddish-brown body, partly with a coppery-green tinge. The dorsal surface is mostly dull and nearly glabrous, except for the setae along the margins of the pronotum and elytra.
