= Amiserica malickyi =

Scientific classification
- Kingdom: Animalia
- Phylum: Arthropoda
- Class: Insecta
- Order: Coleoptera
- Suborder: Polyphaga
- Infraorder: Scarabaeiformia
- Family: Scarabaeidae
- Genus: Amiserica
- Species: A. malickyi

Binomial name
- Amiserica malickyi Ahrens, 2003

Species of beetle

Amiserica malickyi is a species of beetle of the family Scarabaeidae. It is found in Thailand.

== Description ==
Adults reach a length of about 5.3–6 mm. They have a brown, elongate-oval body, partly with a greenish shine. The elytra are light yellowish-brown with dark markings and both the pronotum and elytra have light markings. The dorsal surface is mostly dull and has single, moderately long, erect hairs.
