= Lasioserica meghalayana =

Scientific classification
- Kingdom: Animalia
- Phylum: Arthropoda
- Class: Insecta
- Order: Coleoptera
- Suborder: Polyphaga
- Infraorder: Scarabaeiformia
- Family: Scarabaeidae
- Genus: Lasioserica
- Species: L. meghalayana

Binomial name
- Lasioserica meghalayana Ahrens, 1999

Species of beetle

Lasioserica meghalayana is a species of beetle of the family Scarabaeidae. It is found in India (Meghalaya), Laos, Myanmar, Vietnam and China (Yunnan).

== Description ==
Adults reach a length of about 6.3–7.2 mm. They have a dark chestnut brown, egg-shaped body. The dorsal surface has a few short hairs.
