= Amiserica pardalis =

Scientific classification
- Kingdom: Animalia
- Phylum: Arthropoda
- Class: Insecta
- Order: Coleoptera
- Suborder: Polyphaga
- Infraorder: Scarabaeiformia
- Family: Scarabaeidae
- Genus: Amiserica
- Species: A. pardalis

Binomial name
- Amiserica pardalis (Arrow, 1946)

Synonyms
- Serica pardalis Arrow, 1946

Species of beetle

Amiserica pardalis is a species of beetle of the family Scarabaeidae. It is found in China (Yunnan) and Myanmar.

== Description ==
Adults reach a length of about 6.3–7 mm. They have a dark reddish-brown, elongate-oval body, partly with a greenish shine. Both the pronotum and elytra have light markings. The dorsal surface is mostly dull and has single, short, erect hairs.
