= Amiserica panghongae =

Scientific classification
- Kingdom: Animalia
- Phylum: Arthropoda
- Class: Insecta
- Order: Coleoptera
- Suborder: Polyphaga
- Infraorder: Scarabaeiformia
- Family: Scarabaeidae
- Genus: Amiserica
- Species: A. panghongae

Binomial name
- Amiserica panghongae Ahrens, Fabrizi & Liu, 2021

Species of beetle

Amiserica panghongae is a species of beetle of the family Scarabaeidae. It is found in China (Gansu, Guizhou).

== Description ==
Adults reach a length of about 7–7.5 mm. They have a dark reddish brown, oval body. The head and pronotum are shiny, while the elytra are dull. The antennae are yellowish brown. There are long erect setae, interspersed with short adpressed ones, on the dorsal surface.

== Etymology ==
The species is named after its type locality, Panghong.
