= Lasioserica kulbei =

Scientific classification
- Kingdom: Animalia
- Phylum: Arthropoda
- Class: Insecta
- Order: Coleoptera
- Suborder: Polyphaga
- Infraorder: Scarabaeiformia
- Family: Scarabaeidae
- Genus: Lasioserica
- Species: L. kulbei

Binomial name
- Lasioserica kulbei Ahrens, 1999

Species of beetle

Lasioserica kulbei is a species of beetle of the family Scarabaeidae. It is found in Nepal.

== Description ==
Adults reach a length of about 6.9 mm. They have a dark brown, oblong-oval body. The head is shiny and the dorsal surface is scarcely hairy.

== Etymology ==
The species is named after one of its collectors, Jens Kulbe.
