= Amiserica schoedli =

Scientific classification
- Kingdom: Animalia
- Phylum: Arthropoda
- Class: Insecta
- Order: Coleoptera
- Suborder: Polyphaga
- Infraorder: Scarabaeiformia
- Family: Scarabaeidae
- Genus: Amiserica
- Species: A. schoedli

Binomial name
- Amiserica schoedli Ahrens & Pacholátko, 2005

Species of beetle

Amiserica schoedli is a species of beetle of the family Scarabaeidae. It is found in Myanmar.

== Description ==
Adults reach a length of about 5.8-6.4 mm. They have a brown, elongate-oval body, partly with a greenish shine. Both the pronotum and elytra have lighter markings and the elytra are light yellowish brown with one large dark marking. The dorsal surface is mostly dull (except for the weak shiny frons) and has single, moderately long, erect hairs.

== Etymology ==
The species is named in honour of Coleopterist Stefan Schödl.
