= Lasioserica thoracica =

Scientific classification
- Kingdom: Animalia
- Phylum: Arthropoda
- Class: Insecta
- Order: Coleoptera
- Suborder: Polyphaga
- Infraorder: Scarabaeiformia
- Family: Scarabaeidae
- Genus: Lasioserica
- Species: L. thoracica

Binomial name
- Lasioserica thoracica Brenske, 1898

Synonyms
- Lasioserica schereri Frey, 1962

Species of beetle

Lasioserica thoracica is a species of beetle of the family Scarabaeidae. It is found in India (Sikkim, West Bengal).

== Description ==
Adults reach a length of about 6.2–6.8 mm. They have a reddish brown body, with the head and pronotum partly greenish metallic. The dorsal surface is mostly dull with scattered hairy patches.
