= Amiserica babai =

Scientific classification
- Kingdom: Animalia
- Phylum: Arthropoda
- Class: Insecta
- Order: Coleoptera
- Suborder: Polyphaga
- Infraorder: Scarabaeiformia
- Family: Scarabaeidae
- Genus: Amiserica
- Species: A. babai

Binomial name
- Amiserica babai Kobayashi, 1988

Species of beetle

Amiserica babai is a species of beetle of the family Scarabaeidae. It is found in Taiwan.
