= Amiserica belousovi =

Scientific classification
- Kingdom: Animalia
- Phylum: Arthropoda
- Class: Insecta
- Order: Coleoptera
- Suborder: Polyphaga
- Infraorder: Scarabaeiformia
- Family: Scarabaeidae
- Genus: Amiserica
- Species: A. belousovi

Binomial name
- Amiserica belousovi Ahrens, Fabrizi & Liu, 2021

Species of beetle

Amiserica belousovi is a species of beetle of the family Scarabaeidae. It is found in China (Sichuan).

== Description ==
Adults reach a length of about 9.6–10.4 mm. They have a dark reddish brown, oblong body. The antennae are yellowish brown. The surface is shiny and the dorsal surface is almost glabrous.

== Etymology ==
The species is named after one of its collectors, Belousov.
