= Amiserica mawphlangensis =

Scientific classification
- Kingdom: Animalia
- Phylum: Arthropoda
- Class: Insecta
- Order: Coleoptera
- Suborder: Polyphaga
- Infraorder: Scarabaeiformia
- Family: Scarabaeidae
- Genus: Amiserica
- Species: A. mawphlangensis

Binomial name
- Amiserica mawphlangensis Ahrens, 1999

Species of beetle

Amiserica mawphlangensis is a species of beetle of the family Scarabaeidae. It is found in India (Meghalaya).

== Description ==
Adults reach a length of about 5.8-6.5 mm. They have a dark brown, oblong-oval body. There are reddish brown, irregularly scattered spots on the elytra.
