= Lasioserica pudens =

Scientific classification
- Kingdom: Animalia
- Phylum: Arthropoda
- Class: Insecta
- Order: Coleoptera
- Suborder: Polyphaga
- Infraorder: Scarabaeiformia
- Family: Scarabaeidae
- Genus: Lasioserica
- Species: L. pudens

Binomial name
- Lasioserica pudens Ahrens, 2005

Species of beetle

Lasioserica pudens is a species of beetle of the family Scarabaeidae. It is found in Thailand.

== Description ==
Adults reach a length of about 9.4–9.5 mm. They have a dark reddish brown, oblong body. The dorsal surface is mostly dull and in parts densely covered with white scales and in parts glabrous.

== Etymology ==
The species name is derived from Latin pudens (meaning diffident or shy).
