= Lasioserica breviclypeata =

Scientific classification
- Kingdom: Animalia
- Phylum: Arthropoda
- Class: Insecta
- Order: Coleoptera
- Suborder: Polyphaga
- Infraorder: Scarabaeiformia
- Family: Scarabaeidae
- Genus: Lasioserica
- Species: L. breviclypeata

Binomial name
- Lasioserica breviclypeata Ahrens, 1999

Species of beetle

Lasioserica breviclypeata is a species of beetle of the family Scarabaeidae. It is found in Bhutan.

== Description ==
Adults reach a length of about 6.8–8.1 mm. They have a chestnut brown, oblong-oval body.
