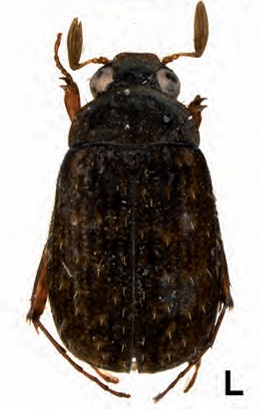

Scientific classification
- Kingdom: Animalia
- Phylum: Arthropoda
- Class: Insecta
- Order: Coleoptera
- Suborder: Polyphaga
- Infraorder: Scarabaeiformia
- Family: Scarabaeidae
- Genus: Amiserica
- Species: A. michaeli

Binomial name
- Amiserica michaeli Ahrens & Fabrizi, 2011

= Amiserica michaeli =

Species of beetle

Amiserica michaeli is a species of beetle of the family Scarabaeidae. It is found in Myanmar.

== Description ==
Adults reach a length of about 4.8–5.8 mm. They have a dark brown, oblong body. The antennae, legs and stains on the elytra are yellowish brown. The dorsal surface is dull, the head is shiny and the surface is sparsely covered with short white setae.

== Etymology ==
The species is named after its collector, Michael Langer.
