= Lasioserica itohi =

Scientific classification
- Kingdom: Animalia
- Phylum: Arthropoda
- Class: Insecta
- Order: Coleoptera
- Suborder: Polyphaga
- Infraorder: Scarabaeiformia
- Family: Scarabaeidae
- Genus: Lasioserica
- Species: L. itohi

Binomial name
- Lasioserica itohi Ahrens, 2002

Species of beetle

Lasioserica itohi is a species of beetle of the family Scarabaeidae. It is found in Thailand.

== Description ==
Adults reach a length of about 6.1–6.6 mm. They have a dark brown, elongate-oval body, sometimes with a reddish shine. The dorsal surface is mostly dull and covered with yellowish-white hairs.

== Etymology ==
The species is named after the Coleopterist Takeshi Itoh.
