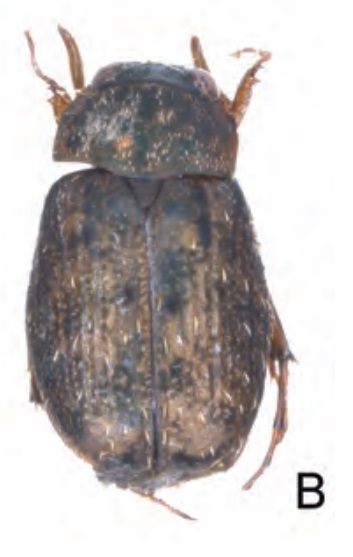

Scientific classification
- Kingdom: Animalia
- Phylum: Arthropoda
- Class: Insecta
- Order: Coleoptera
- Suborder: Polyphaga
- Infraorder: Scarabaeiformia
- Family: Scarabaeidae
- Genus: Amiserica
- Species: A. hunliana

Binomial name
- Amiserica hunliana Ahrens & Fabrizi, 2016

= Amiserica hunliana =

Species of beetle

Amiserica hunliana is a species of beetle of the family Scarabaeidae. It is found in north-eastern India.

== Description ==
Adults reach a length of about 5.4 mm. They have a dark brown, oblong body, with light brown areas around the punctures. The surface is mostly dull, partly with a greenish shine dorsally. The antennae are yellowish brown and there are tiny white, scale-like setae on the elytra and pronotum.

== Etymology ==
The species is named for its type locality, Hunli.
