= Amiserica semipunctata =

Scientific classification
- Kingdom: Animalia
- Phylum: Arthropoda
- Class: Insecta
- Order: Coleoptera
- Suborder: Polyphaga
- Infraorder: Scarabaeiformia
- Family: Scarabaeidae
- Genus: Amiserica
- Species: A. semipunctata

Binomial name
- Amiserica semipunctata Ahrens, 1999

Species of beetle

Amiserica semipunctata is a species of beetle of the family Scarabaeidae. It is found in Myanmar.

== Description ==
Adults reach a length of about 5.9 mm. They have a light chestnut brown, oblong-oval body. The dorsal surface is covered with scattered hairs of varying lengths.
