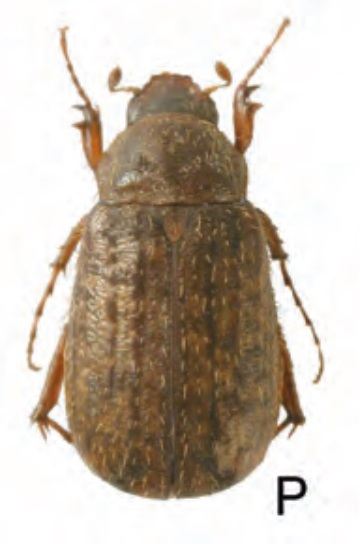

Scientific classification
- Kingdom: Animalia
- Phylum: Arthropoda
- Class: Insecta
- Order: Coleoptera
- Suborder: Polyphaga
- Infraorder: Scarabaeiformia
- Family: Scarabaeidae
- Genus: Amiserica
- Species: A. krausei

Binomial name
- Amiserica krausei Ahrens, 2004

= Amiserica krausei =

Species of beetle

Amiserica krausei is a species of beetle of the family Scarabaeidae. It is found in the Kumaon Himalaya and in western and western-central Nepal.

== Description ==
Adults reach a length of about 5.8-6.3 mm. They have a dark brown, elongate-oval body. The elytra are yellow-brown with dark speckles. The surface is dull except for the shining head. The upper surface is mostly hairy, except for some unpunctured patch-like glabrous areas.

== Etymology ==
The species is named in honour of Rüdiger Krause, who supported the research of the author.
