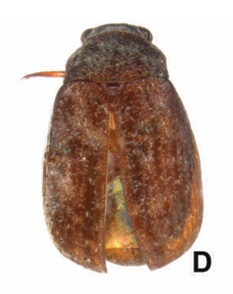

Scientific classification
- Kingdom: Animalia
- Phylum: Arthropoda
- Class: Insecta
- Order: Coleoptera
- Suborder: Polyphaga
- Infraorder: Scarabaeiformia
- Family: Scarabaeidae
- Genus: Lasioserica
- Species: L. beibengana

Binomial name
- Lasioserica beibengana Liu & Ahrens, 2014

= Lasioserica beibengana =

Species of beetle

Lasioserica beibengana is a species of beetle of the family Scarabaeidae. It is found in China (Xizang).

== Description ==
Adults reach a length of about 5–5.6 mm. They have an oblong body. The dorsal surface is dark brown and the antennae and ventral surface are brown. The dorsal surface is dull, the pronotum and head with a greenish shine. The dorsal surface is sparsely setose, with fine minute and white, scale-like setae on the elytra and pronotum.

== Etymology ==
The species is named after the type locality, Beibeng.
