= Lasioserica pseudopilosella =

Scientific classification
- Kingdom: Animalia
- Phylum: Arthropoda
- Class: Insecta
- Order: Coleoptera
- Suborder: Polyphaga
- Infraorder: Scarabaeiformia
- Family: Scarabaeidae
- Genus: Lasioserica
- Species: L. pseudopilosella

Binomial name
- Lasioserica pseudopilosella Ahrens, 1996

Species of beetle

Lasioserica pseudopilosella is a species of beetle of the family Scarabaeidae. It is found in Nepal.

== Description ==
Adults reach a length of about 6-6.5 mm. They have a dark greenish-brown body. The dorsal surface is mostly dull and densely or sparsely setose, but always denser on the pronotum than on the elytra.
