= Lasioserica pilosella =

Scientific classification
- Kingdom: Animalia
- Phylum: Arthropoda
- Class: Insecta
- Order: Coleoptera
- Suborder: Polyphaga
- Infraorder: Scarabaeiformia
- Family: Scarabaeidae
- Genus: Lasioserica
- Species: L. pilosella

Binomial name
- Lasioserica pilosella (Brenske, 1894)

Synonyms
- Serica pilosella Brenske, 1894

Species of beetle

Lasioserica pilosella is a species of beetle of the family Scarabaeidae. It is found in India (Sikkim) and possibly Nepal.

== Description ==
Adults reach a length of about 6.3 mm. They have a metallic green body. The dorsal surface is mostly dull with single setae. The pronotum is densely setose.
