= Lasioserica insularis =

Scientific classification
- Kingdom: Animalia
- Phylum: Arthropoda
- Class: Insecta
- Order: Coleoptera
- Suborder: Polyphaga
- Infraorder: Scarabaeiformia
- Family: Scarabaeidae
- Genus: Lasioserica
- Species: L. insularis

Binomial name
- Lasioserica insularis Brenske, 1899

Species of beetle

Lasioserica insularis is a species of beetle of the family Scarabaeidae. It is found in Indonesia (Borneo).

== Description ==
Adults reach a length of about 6 mm. The dorsal surface is brown and dull, with irregular spots on the elytra and sparse white scale-like hairs.
