= Amiserica incisa =

Scientific classification
- Kingdom: Animalia
- Phylum: Arthropoda
- Class: Insecta
- Order: Coleoptera
- Suborder: Polyphaga
- Infraorder: Scarabaeiformia
- Family: Scarabaeidae
- Genus: Amiserica
- Species: A. incisa

Binomial name
- Amiserica incisa Ahrens, Fabrizi & Liu, 2021

Species of beetle

Amiserica incisa is a species of beetle of the family Scarabaeidae. It is found in China (Shaanxi).

== Description ==
Adults reach a length of about 7–9 mm. They have a dirty brown, oblong body. The antennae are yellowish brown. The dorsal surface is mostly dull and almost glabrous.

== Etymology ==
The species name is derived from Latin incisus (meaning incised) and refers to the paired dorsolateral phallobasal process which has a deep incision.
