= Lasioserica pacholatkoi =

Scientific classification
- Kingdom: Animalia
- Phylum: Arthropoda
- Class: Insecta
- Order: Coleoptera
- Suborder: Polyphaga
- Infraorder: Scarabaeiformia
- Family: Scarabaeidae
- Genus: Lasioserica
- Species: L. pacholatkoi

Binomial name
- Lasioserica pacholatkoi Ahrens, 2000

Species of beetle

Lasioserica pacholatkoi is a species of beetle of the family Scarabaeidae. It is found in Bhutan and China (Xizang).

== Description ==
Adults reach a length of about 9.5–9.7 mm. They have a chestnut brown, elongate-oval body, partly somewhat reddish. The dorsal surface is mostly dull and nearly glabrous, except for the setae along the margins of the elytra and pronotum.

== Etymology ==
The species is named after a friend of the author, Petr Pacholátko.
