= Amiserica antennalis =

Scientific classification
- Kingdom: Animalia
- Phylum: Arthropoda
- Class: Insecta
- Order: Coleoptera
- Suborder: Polyphaga
- Infraorder: Scarabaeiformia
- Family: Scarabaeidae
- Genus: Amiserica
- Species: A. antennalis

Binomial name
- Amiserica antennalis (Nomura, 1974)

Synonyms
- Lasioserica antennalis Nomura, 1974

Species of beetle

Amiserica antennalis is a species of beetle of the family Scarabaeidae. It is found in Taiwan.

== Description ==
Adults reach a length of about 7.2 mm. They have a dark reddish brown, oblong body. The antennae are yellowish brown. The dorsal surface is mostly dull and almost glabrous.
