= List of Isonychus species =

This is a list of 147 species in Isonychus, a genus of May beetles and junebugs in the family Scarabaeidae.

== Isonychus species ==
- Isonychus aenescens Moser, 1919^{c g}
- Isonychus aequatorialis Moser, 1924^{c g}
- Isonychus albicinctus (Mannerheim, 1829)^{c g}
- Isonychus albofasciatus Blanchard, 1850^{c g}
- Isonychus albosignatus Moser, 1921^{c g}
- Isonychus alienus Frey, 1970^{c g}
- Isonychus angosturanus Moser, 1924^{c g}
- Isonychus arbusticola Erichson, 1847^{c g}
- Isonychus argentinus Moser, 1919^{c g}
- Isonychus arizonensis Howden, 1959^{i c g b}
- Isonychus bahianus Frey, 1974^{c g}
- Isonychus bimaculatus Burmeister, 1855^{c g}
- Isonychus bistrigus Burmeister, 1855^{c g}
- Isonychus bivittatus Burmeister, 1855^{c g}
- Isonychus boliviensis Moser, 1918^{c g}
- Isonychus braumeisteri Frey, 1969^{c g}
- Isonychus bruchiformis (Germar, 1813)^{c g}
- Isonychus burmeisteri Von Dalle Torre, 1912^{c g}
- Isonychus callosipygus Frey, 1965^{c g}
- Isonychus castaneus Burmeister, 1855^{c g}
- Isonychus catharinae Blanchard, 1850^{c g}
- Isonychus caudiculatus Moser, 1918^{c g}
- Isonychus cervicapra Frey, 1965^{c g}
- Isonychus cervinalis Frey, 1965^{c g}
- Isonychus cervinodes Frey, 1965^{c g}
- Isonychus cervinus Erichson, 1847^{c g}
- Isonychus chacoensis Moser, 1918^{c g}
- Isonychus chiriquinus Bates, 1887^{c g}
- Isonychus cinereus Blanchard, 1850^{c g}
- Isonychus costaricensis Moser, 1918^{c g}
- Isonychus crinitus Blanchard, 1850^{c g}
- Isonychus denudatus Blanchard, 1850^{c g}
- Isonychus discolor Moser, 1924^{c g}
- Isonychus egregius Frey, 1965^{c g}
- Isonychus elegans Blanchard, 1850^{c g}
- Isonychus elongatus Frey, 1965^{c g}
- Isonychus erectepilosus Frey, 1970^{c g}
- Isonychus fasciatipennis Moser, 1924^{c g}
- Isonychus fasciolatus Blanchard, 1850^{c g}
- Isonychus flaviventris Moser, 1921^{c g}
- Isonychus flavopilosus Moser, 1921^{c g}
- Isonychus fraternus Moser, 1918^{c g}
- Isonychus fraudulentus Frey, 1969^{c g}
- Isonychus fulvescens Blanchard, 1850^{c g}
- Isonychus fulvipennis Moser, 1921^{c g}
- Isonychus fuscipennis Blanchard, 1850^{c g}
- Isonychus gracilipes Blanchard, 1850^{c g}
- Isonychus gracilis Burmeister, 1855^{c g}
- Isonychus granarius Burmeister, 1855^{c g}
- Isonychus granuliventris Frey, 1970^{c g}
- Isonychus griseolus Moser, 1921^{c g}
- Isonychus griseopilosus Moser, 1921^{c g}
- Isonychus griseus Mannerheim, 1829^{c g}
- Isonychus guayanensis Frey, 1970^{c g}
- Isonychus hiekei Frey, 1965^{c g}
- Isonychus hirsutus Bates, 1887^{c g}
- Isonychus kulzeri Frey, 1967^{c g}
- Isonychus kuntzeni Moser, 1921^{c g}
- Isonychus laevipygus Frey, 1964^{c g}
- Isonychus leechi Frey, 1969^{c g}
- Isonychus limbatus Burmeister, 1855^{c g}
- Isonychus lindemannae Frey, 1974^{c g}
- Isonychus lineatus Burmeister, 1855^{c g}
- Isonychus lineola Blanchard, 1850^{c g}
- Isonychus lituratus Blanchard, 1850^{c g}
- Isonychus lojanus Frey, 1967^{c g}
- Isonychus maculatus Waterhouse, 1874^{c g}
- Isonychus maculipennis Moser, 1918^{c g}
- Isonychus marmoratus Blanchard, 1850^{c g}
- Isonychus marmoreus Burmeister, 1855^{c g}
- Isonychus microsquamosus Frey, 1970^{c g}
- Isonychus minutus (Fabricius, 1801)^{c g}
- Isonychus murinus Blanchard, 1850^{c g}
- Isonychus mus Burmeister, 1855^{c g}
- Isonychus mutans Frey, 1970^{c g}
- Isonychus neglectus Moser, 1918^{c g}
- Isonychus nigripes Moser, 1921^{c g}
- Isonychus nitens Moser, 1921^{c g}
- Isonychus nitidus Burmeister, 1855^{c g}
- Isonychus nubeculus Frey, 1969^{c g}
- Isonychus nubilus Burmeister, 1855^{c g}
- Isonychus nudipennis Frey, 1967^{c g}
- Isonychus obesulus Burmeister, 1855^{c g}
- Isonychus oblongoguttatus Moser, 1921^{c g}
- Isonychus oblongomaculatus Moser, 1921^{c g}
- Isonychus obsoletus Blanchard, 1850^{c g}
- Isonychus ocellatus Burmeister, 1855^{c g}
- Isonychus ochraceus Blanchard, 1850^{c g}
- Isonychus ohausi Moser, 1921^{c g}
- Isonychus ornatipennis Moser, 1921^{c g}
- Isonychus ovinus Erichson, 1847^{c g}
- Isonychus paganus Blanchard, 1850^{c g}
- Isonychus paradoxus Bates, 1887^{c g}
- Isonychus parallelus Frey, 1970^{c g}
- Isonychus paranus Moser, 1921^{c g}
- Isonychus parvulus Moser, 1918^{c g}
- Isonychus pauloensis Frey, 1970^{c g}
- Isonychus pavonii Erichson, 1847^{c g}
- Isonychus penai Frey, 1966^{c g}
- Isonychus pereirai Frey, 1970^{c g}
- Isonychus peruanus Moser, 1921^{c g}
- Isonychus phlaeopterus Blanchard, 1850^{c g}
- Isonychus pictus Sharp, 1877^{c g}
- Isonychus pilicollis Moser, 1924^{c g}
- Isonychus pilosus Evans, 2003^{c g}
- Isonychus piperitus Bates, 1887^{c g}
- Isonychus podicalis Moser, 1918^{c g}
- Isonychus politus Burmeister, 1855^{c g}
- Isonychus prasinus Nonfried, 1891^{c g}
- Isonychus psittacinus Dejean, 1836^{c g}
- Isonychus pulchellus Moser, 1918^{c g}
- Isonychus religiosus Evans, 2003^{c g}
- Isonychus rosettae Frey, 1969^{c g}
- Isonychus rugicollis Burmeister, 1855^{c g}
- Isonychus saltanus Frey, 1969^{c g}
- Isonychus saylori Frey, 1969^{c g}
- Isonychus schneblei Frey, 1964^{c g}
- Isonychus scutellaris Moser, 1918^{c g}
- Isonychus setifer Moser, 1918^{c g}
- Isonychus similis Frey, 1973^{c g}
- Isonychus simplex Frey, 1976^{c g}
- Isonychus simulator Frey, 1969^{c g}
- Isonychus soricinus Blanchard, 1850^{c g}
- Isonychus squamifer Blanchard, 1850^{c g}
- Isonychus squamulosus Frey, 1970^{c g}
- Isonychus striatipennis Moser, 1918^{c g}
- Isonychus striolatus Frey, 1970^{c g}
- Isonychus submaculatus Moser, 1921^{c g}
- Isonychus sulcicollis Moser, 1921^{c g}
- Isonychus sulphureus Mannerheim, 1829^{c g}
- Isonychus suturalis Mannerheim, 1829^{c g}
- Isonychus tessellatus Burmeister, 1855^{c g}
- Isonychus tomentosus Burmeister, 1855^{c g}
- Isonychus unicolor Blanchard, 1850^{c g}
- Isonychus unidens Frey, 1972^{c g}
- Isonychus uniformis Moser, 1920^{c g}
- Isonychus ursus Moser, 1918^{c g}
- Isonychus varians Blanchard, 1850^{c g}
- Isonychus variegatus (Germar, 1824)^{c g}
- Isonychus variipennis Moser, 1918^{c g}
- Isonychus ventralis Moser, 1921^{c g}
- Isonychus vestitus (Castelnau, 1840)^{c g}
- Isonychus vicinus Moser, 1918^{c g}
- Isonychus vittatus Burmeister, 1855^{c g}
- Isonychus vittiger Blanchard, 1850^{c g}
- Isonychus vittipennis Moser, 1921^{c g}
- Isonychus zikani Moser, 1921^{c g}

Data sources: i = ITIS, c = Catalogue of Life, g = GBIF, b = Bugguide.net
