= Isonychus vicinus =

Scientific classification
- Kingdom: Animalia
- Phylum: Arthropoda
- Clade: Pancrustacea
- Class: Insecta
- Order: Coleoptera
- Suborder: Polyphaga
- Infraorder: Scarabaeiformia
- Family: Scarabaeidae
- Genus: Isonychus
- Species: I. vicinus

Binomial name
- Isonychus vicinus Moser, 1918

Species of beetle

Isonychus vicinus is a species of beetle of the family Scarabaeidae. It is found in Bolivia.

== Description ==
Adults reach a length of about 4–5 mm. They are black and shiny, with the legs and usually also the elytra reddish-brown. The pubescence is grey. The head is punctured. The pronotum is densely punctured, the punctures with grey hairs. On the elytra, the spaces between the striae are much less convex than in similar species Isonychus chacoensis and the grey hairs are equally, if not particularly, dense. The underside is moderately densely covered with grey hairs.
