= Trioserica lepichaeta =

Scientific classification
- Kingdom: Animalia
- Phylum: Arthropoda
- Clade: Pancrustacea
- Class: Insecta
- Order: Coleoptera
- Suborder: Polyphaga
- Infraorder: Scarabaeiformia
- Family: Scarabaeidae
- Genus: Trioserica
- Species: T. lepichaeta

Binomial name
- Trioserica lepichaeta Moser, 1922

Species of beetle

Trioserica lepichaeta is a species of beetle of the family Scarabaeidae. It is found in the Philippines (Mindoro).

== Description ==
Adults reach a length of about 5-5.5 mm. They are very similar to Trioserica sparsesquamosa, but a little darker in colour, the antennae are different, the sides of the pronotum are strongly curved, and the scales of the elytra are narrower.
