= Trioserica trifoliata =

Scientific classification
- Kingdom: Animalia
- Phylum: Arthropoda
- Clade: Pancrustacea
- Class: Insecta
- Order: Coleoptera
- Suborder: Polyphaga
- Infraorder: Scarabaeiformia
- Family: Scarabaeidae
- Genus: Trioserica
- Species: T. trifoliata

Binomial name
- Trioserica trifoliata Moser, 1922

Species of beetle

Trioserica trifoliata is a species of beetle of the family Scarabaeidae. It is found in the Philippines (Mindanao).

== Description ==
Adults reach a length of about 4.5–5.5 mm. They are very similar to Periserica zamboangensis, but the antennae are different.
