= Trioserica phuphan =

Scientific classification
- Kingdom: Animalia
- Phylum: Arthropoda
- Class: Insecta
- Order: Coleoptera
- Suborder: Polyphaga
- Infraorder: Scarabaeiformia
- Family: Scarabaeidae
- Genus: Trioserica
- Species: T. phuphan

Binomial name
- Trioserica phuphan Ahrens, Lukic & Pham, 2024

Species of beetle

Trioserica phuphan is a species of beetle of the family Scarabaeidae. It is found in Laos.

== Description ==
Adults reach a length of about 6.9 mm. They have a yellowish brown, oblong body, with small dark spots on the elytra and pronotum. The antennae and ventral surface are yellow, while the dorsal surface is dull. The surface is almost glabrous.

== Etymology ==
The species is named after its type locality, Phu Phan mountain.
