= Trioserica chumomray =

Scientific classification
- Kingdom: Animalia
- Phylum: Arthropoda
- Class: Insecta
- Order: Coleoptera
- Suborder: Polyphaga
- Infraorder: Scarabaeiformia
- Family: Scarabaeidae
- Genus: Trioserica
- Species: T. chumomray

Binomial name
- Trioserica chumomray Ahrens, Lukic & Pham, 2024

Species of beetle

Trioserica chumomray is a species of beetle of the family Scarabaeidae. It is found in Vietnam.

== Description ==
Adults reach a length of about 6.3 mm. They have a short oval body. The dorsal surface is dark brown and the ventral surface and antennae are yellowish brown, while the labroclypeus is red brown. The dorsal surface is dull and partly weakly shiny. The surface is almost glabrous.

== Etymology ==
The species is named after its occurrence in the Chu Mom Ray National Park.
