= Trioserica maculipennis =

Scientific classification
- Kingdom: Animalia
- Phylum: Arthropoda
- Class: Insecta
- Order: Coleoptera
- Suborder: Polyphaga
- Infraorder: Scarabaeiformia
- Family: Scarabaeidae
- Genus: Trioserica
- Species: T. maculipennis

Binomial name
- Trioserica maculipennis (Miyake & Yamaya, 2001)

Synonyms
- Sinoserica maculipennis Miyake & Yamaya, 2001

Species of beetle

Trioserica maculipennis is a species of beetle of the family Scarabaeidae. It is found in China (Yunnan).

== Description ==
Adults reach a length of about 8.5 mm. They have a yellowish brown, oblong body, with small dark spots and yellow antennae. The dorsal surface is moderately dull and almost glabrous.
