= Trioserica chaweewanae =

Scientific classification
- Kingdom: Animalia
- Phylum: Arthropoda
- Class: Insecta
- Order: Coleoptera
- Suborder: Polyphaga
- Infraorder: Scarabaeiformia
- Family: Scarabaeidae
- Genus: Trioserica
- Species: T. chaweewanae

Binomial name
- Trioserica chaweewanae Ahrens, Lukic & Pham, 2024

Species of beetle

Trioserica chaweewanae is a species of beetle of the family Scarabaeidae. It is found in Thailand.

== Description ==
Adults reach a length of about 5.9–6.2 mm. They have an oblong body. The dorsal surface is uniformly dark brown, while the ventral surface is red-brown. The antennae are yellow. The dorsal surface is dull and partly iridescent and the surface is almost glabrous.

== Etymology ==
The species is dedicated to Chaweewan Hutacharern.
