= Trioserica daweishana =

Scientific classification
- Kingdom: Animalia
- Phylum: Arthropoda
- Class: Insecta
- Order: Coleoptera
- Suborder: Polyphaga
- Infraorder: Scarabaeiformia
- Family: Scarabaeidae
- Genus: Trioserica
- Species: T. daweishana

Binomial name
- Trioserica daweishana Ahrens, Liu & Fabrizi, 2021

Species of beetle

Trioserica daweishana is a species of beetle of the family Scarabaeidae. It is found in China (Yunnan).

== Description ==
Adults reach a length of about 8.5 mm. They have a yellowish brown, oblong body, with yellow antennae. The dorsal surface has small or larger dark spots and is dull and glabrous, except for some white setae on the elytra.

== Etymology ==
The species is named after its type locality, Daweishan mountain.
