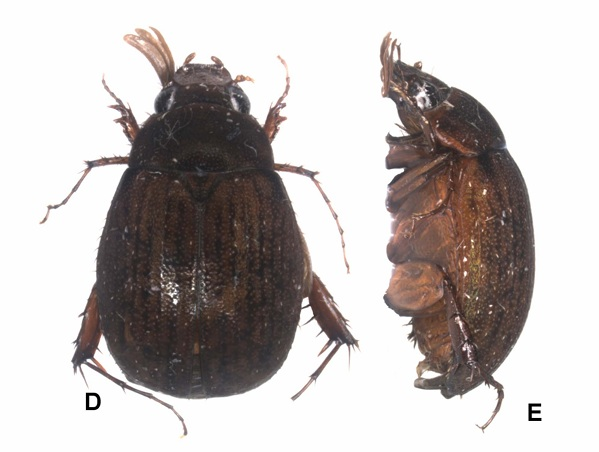

Scientific classification
- Kingdom: Animalia
- Phylum: Arthropoda
- Class: Insecta
- Order: Coleoptera
- Suborder: Polyphaga
- Infraorder: Scarabaeiformia
- Family: Scarabaeidae
- Genus: Trioserica
- Species: T. kokut

Binomial name
- Trioserica kokut Ahrens & Pham, 2025

= Trioserica kokut =

Species of beetle

Trioserica kokut is a species of beetle of the family Scarabaeidae. It is found on Ko Kut Island, Thailand.

== Description ==
Adults reach a length of about 6.2–6.4 mm. They have a dark brown, oblong oval body, with the margins of the pronotum and numerous dots on the elytra lighter reddish brown. The antennae and ventral surface are yellowish brown. The dorsal surface is dull, and parts of the impunctate areas of the elytra are shiny. The pronotum is iridescent. The surface is almost glabrous.

== Etymology ==
The species is named after its type locality, Kokut Island.
