= Periserica triflabellata =

Scientific classification
- Kingdom: Animalia
- Phylum: Arthropoda
- Class: Insecta
- Order: Coleoptera
- Suborder: Polyphaga
- Infraorder: Scarabaeiformia
- Family: Scarabaeidae
- Genus: Periserica
- Species: P. triflabellata

Binomial name
- Periserica triflabellata Fabrizi & Ahrens, 2014

Species of beetle

Periserica triflabellata is a species of beetle of the family Scarabaeidae. It is found in Sri Lanka.

== Description ==
Adults reach a length of about 7.2 mm. They have a yellowish brown, oblong body. The legs and antennae are also yellowish brown, but the head is black and the elytra has dark spots. The dorsal surface is shiny and sparsely setose.

== Etymology ==
The species name is derived from Latin tri- (meaning three) and flabellatus (meaning fan-like) and refers to the number of antennomeres composing the antennal club.
