= Isonychus boliviensis =

Scientific classification
- Kingdom: Animalia
- Phylum: Arthropoda
- Clade: Pancrustacea
- Class: Insecta
- Order: Coleoptera
- Suborder: Polyphaga
- Infraorder: Scarabaeiformia
- Family: Scarabaeidae
- Genus: Isonychus
- Species: I. boliviensis

Binomial name
- Isonychus boliviensis Moser, 1918

Species of beetle

Isonychus boliviensis is a species of beetle of the family Scarabaeidae. It is found in Bolivia.

== Description ==
Adults reach a length of about 6.5 mm. They have a brown or blackish-brown, elongate body. The upper surface is covered with grey scales, which are partly lighter, partly darker, so that the upper surface appears more or less mottled. The antennae are yellowish-brown. There is often (but not always) a light midline on the pronotum. On the elytra, either the lighter or darker scales may predominate. The underside is covered with white scales.
