= Isonychus maculipennis =

Scientific classification
- Kingdom: Animalia
- Phylum: Arthropoda
- Clade: Pancrustacea
- Class: Insecta
- Order: Coleoptera
- Suborder: Polyphaga
- Infraorder: Scarabaeiformia
- Family: Scarabaeidae
- Genus: Isonychus
- Species: I. maculipennis

Binomial name
- Isonychus maculipennis Moser, 1918

Species of beetle

Isonychus maculipennis is a species of beetle of the family Scarabaeidae. It is found in Bolivia.

== Description ==
Adults reach a length of about 4.5 mm. They are reddish-brown, the upper surface densely covered with scale-like yellowish-grey hairs. The antennae are yellowish-brown. The pronotum and scutellum are densely covered with grey and yellowish-grey hairs. The scale-like hairs on the elytra are also yellowish-grey. At the base of the elytra are a few small pale spots, while elsewhere the elytra are covered with numerous brown speckles. On the underside, the chest and sides of the abdomen are covered with elongated white scales, while the middle of the abdomen is covered with grey hairs. The legs are yellowish-brown and covered with white, bristle-like hairs.
