= Periserica densipunctata =

Scientific classification
- Kingdom: Animalia
- Phylum: Arthropoda
- Class: Insecta
- Order: Coleoptera
- Suborder: Polyphaga
- Infraorder: Scarabaeiformia
- Family: Scarabaeidae
- Genus: Periserica
- Species: P. densipunctata

Binomial name
- Periserica densipunctata Fabrizi & Ahrens, 2014

Synonyms
- Periserica densepunctata

Species of beetle

Periserica densipunctata is a species of beetle of the family Scarabaeidae. It is found in Sri Lanka.

== Description ==
Adults reach a length of about 8.1 mm. They have a dark reddish brown, oval body, while the legs are reddish, the antennae are yellowish brown, the abdomen is yellowish brown and the head, pronotum and scutellum are dark with greenish shine. There are reddish spots on the pronotum. The elytra are reddish brown with blackish apical and sutural margins and dark spots. The dorsal surface is moderately shiny and sparsely setose.

== Etymology ==
The species name is derived from Latin densus (meaning dense) and punctatus (meaning punctate) and refers to the dense punctation.
