= Trioserica csorbai =

Scientific classification
- Kingdom: Animalia
- Phylum: Arthropoda
- Class: Insecta
- Order: Coleoptera
- Suborder: Polyphaga
- Infraorder: Scarabaeiformia
- Family: Scarabaeidae
- Genus: Trioserica
- Species: T. csorbai

Binomial name
- Trioserica csorbai Ahrens, Lukic & Pham, 2024

Species of beetle

Trioserica csorbai is a species of beetle of the family Scarabaeidae. It is found in Laos.

== Description ==
Adults reach a length of about 6.1–6.2 mm. They have a yellowish brown, oblong body, with numerous small dark spots. The antennae are yellow and the frons darker and with a greenish iridescent shine. The dorsal surface is dull, and the surface is almost glabrous.

== Etymology ==
The species is named after one of its collectors, G. Csorba.
