= Trioserica konplongensis =

Scientific classification
- Kingdom: Animalia
- Phylum: Arthropoda
- Class: Insecta
- Order: Coleoptera
- Suborder: Polyphaga
- Infraorder: Scarabaeiformia
- Family: Scarabaeidae
- Genus: Trioserica
- Species: T. konplongensis

Binomial name
- Trioserica konplongensis Ahrens, Lukic & Pham, 2024

Species of beetle

Trioserica konplongensis is a species of beetle of the family Scarabaeidae. It is found in Vietnam.

== Description ==
Adults reach a length of about 6.3 mm. They have a yellowish brown, oblong body, with small dark spots. The antennae are yellow. The dorsal surface is moderately dull and almost glabrous.

== Etymology ==
The species is named after its occurrence in Konplong District.
