= Trioserica prome =

Scientific classification
- Kingdom: Animalia
- Phylum: Arthropoda
- Class: Insecta
- Order: Coleoptera
- Suborder: Polyphaga
- Infraorder: Scarabaeiformia
- Family: Scarabaeidae
- Genus: Trioserica
- Species: T. prome

Binomial name
- Trioserica prome Ahrens, Lukic & Pham, 2024

Species of beetle

Trioserica prome is a species of beetle of the family Scarabaeidae. It is found in Thailand.

== Description ==
Adults reach a length of about 6 mm. They have a brown, oblong body. The pronotum and elytral margins are lighter yellowish brown, with small light spots on the elytra and two large, indistinct dark spots on the pronotum. The antennae and ventral surface are yellow. The dorsal surface is dull and the surface is almost glabrous.

== Etymology ==
The species is named after its type locality, Prome (Pyay).
