= Isonychus neglectus =

Scientific classification
- Kingdom: Animalia
- Phylum: Arthropoda
- Clade: Pancrustacea
- Class: Insecta
- Order: Coleoptera
- Suborder: Polyphaga
- Infraorder: Scarabaeiformia
- Family: Scarabaeidae
- Genus: Isonychus
- Species: I. neglectus

Binomial name
- Isonychus neglectus Moser, 1918

Species of beetle

Isonychus neglectus is a species of beetle of the family Scarabaeidae. It is found in Mexico (Veracruz).

== Description ==
Adults reach a length of about 11–12 mm. They are covered with grey hairs. On the elytra there is a slanting brown transverse band in front of the middle, a transverse band behind the middle, which is shortened on both sides, and an apical band. Sometimes the lateral margin is also brown and sometimes, the brown bands are interrupted by grey longitudinal stripes. There are short, erect hairs on the elytra, which originate from distinct small, bare patches.
