= Trioserica sparsesquamosa =

Scientific classification
- Kingdom: Animalia
- Phylum: Arthropoda
- Clade: Pancrustacea
- Class: Insecta
- Order: Coleoptera
- Suborder: Polyphaga
- Infraorder: Scarabaeiformia
- Family: Scarabaeidae
- Genus: Trioserica
- Species: T. sparsesquamosa

Binomial name
- Trioserica sparsesquamosa Moser, 1922

Species of beetle

Trioserica sparsesquamosa is a species of beetle of the family Scarabaeidae. It is found in the Philippines (Mindanao).

== Description ==
Adults reach a length of about 5 mm. They are very similar to Neoserica longiclava, but they have a green frons and the antennal club of the males is more strongly elongated, and the stalk is more than twice as long. The elytra are not sparsely setose.
