= Trioserica guerlachi =

Scientific classification
- Kingdom: Animalia
- Phylum: Arthropoda
- Class: Insecta
- Order: Coleoptera
- Suborder: Polyphaga
- Infraorder: Scarabaeiformia
- Family: Scarabaeidae
- Genus: Trioserica
- Species: T. guerlachi

Binomial name
- Trioserica guerlachi Ahrens, Lukic & Pham, 2024

Species of beetle

Trioserica guerlachi is a species of beetle of the family Scarabaeidae. It is found in Vietnam.

== Description ==
Adults reach a length of about 6.9 mm. They have a short oval body. The dorsal surface is dark brown and the ventral surface is red brown. The labroclypeus and margins of the pronotum are reddish brown and the antennae are yellow. The dorsal surface is dull with some iridescent shine and the surface is almost glabrous.

== Etymology ==
The species is named after its collector, R.P. Guerlach.
