= Trioserica pahinngam =

Scientific classification
- Kingdom: Animalia
- Phylum: Arthropoda
- Class: Insecta
- Order: Coleoptera
- Suborder: Polyphaga
- Infraorder: Scarabaeiformia
- Family: Scarabaeidae
- Genus: Trioserica
- Species: T. pahinngam

Binomial name
- Trioserica pahinngam Ahrens, Lukic & Pham, 2024

Species of beetle

Trioserica pahinngam is a species of beetle of the family Scarabaeidae. It is found in Thailand.

== Description ==
Adults reach a length of about 6.6 mm. They have a yellow, oblong-oval body, with numerous small dark spots. The antennae and ventral surface are yellow and the frons is blackish with greenish shine. The dorsal surface is dull and partly iridescent and the surface is almost glabrous.

== Etymology ==
The species is named after its type locality, Pa Hin Ngam national park.
