= Isonychus simplex =

Scientific classification
- Kingdom: Animalia
- Phylum: Arthropoda
- Class: Insecta
- Order: Coleoptera
- Suborder: Polyphaga
- Infraorder: Scarabaeiformia
- Family: Scarabaeidae
- Genus: Isonychus
- Species: I. simplex

Binomial name
- Isonychus simplex Frey, 1976

Species of beetle

Isonychus simplex is a species of beetle of the family Scarabaeidae. It is found in Brazil (Bahia).

== Description ==
Adults reach a length of about 6 mm. They have a light brown body, sometimes with the area around the scutellum and partly also the suture and the lateral margin of the elytra blackish. The elytra and pygidium are covered with whitish, fine setae. The underside is also densely covered with hairs. The antennae are light brown.
