= Trioserica huaypok =

Scientific classification
- Kingdom: Animalia
- Phylum: Arthropoda
- Class: Insecta
- Order: Coleoptera
- Suborder: Polyphaga
- Infraorder: Scarabaeiformia
- Family: Scarabaeidae
- Genus: Trioserica
- Species: T. huaypok

Binomial name
- Trioserica huaypok Ahrens, Lukic & Pham, 2024

Species of beetle

Trioserica huaypok is a species of beetle of the family Scarabaeidae. It is found in Thailand.

== Description ==
Adults reach a length of about 5.9 mm. They have an oblong body. The dorsal and ventral surface are red brown with indistinct dark spots. The frons is dark brown and the antennae are yellow. The dorsal surface is dull and partly iridescent and the surface is almost glabrous.

== Etymology ==
The species is named after the locality Huay Pok, in close vicinity to the type locality.
