= Isonychus arizonensis =

Scientific classification
- Kingdom: Animalia
- Phylum: Arthropoda
- Clade: Pancrustacea
- Class: Insecta
- Order: Coleoptera
- Suborder: Polyphaga
- Infraorder: Scarabaeiformia
- Family: Scarabaeidae
- Genus: Isonychus
- Species: I. arizonensis

Binomial name
- Isonychus arizonensis Howden, 1959

Species of beetle

Isonychus arizonensis is a species of scarab beetle in the family Scarabaeidae. It is found in both Central America and North America.
