= Isonychus marmoratus =

Scientific classification
- Kingdom: Animalia
- Phylum: Arthropoda
- Class: Insecta
- Order: Coleoptera
- Suborder: Polyphaga
- Infraorder: Scarabaeiformia
- Family: Scarabaeidae
- Genus: Isonychus
- Species: I. marmoratus

Binomial name
- Isonychus marmoratus Blanchard, 1850

Synonyms
- Isonychus flavofasciatus Moser, 1918; Isonychus principalis Burmeister, 1855

Species of beetle

Isonychus marmoratus is a species of beetle of the family Scarabaeidae. It is found in Colombia and Venezuela.

== Description ==
Adults reach a length of about 13 mm. They are brown with an ornate sheen and the head and legs are ornate green. The frons is covered with yellow hairs and the antennae are reddish-yellow with a blackish-brown club. The pronotum is rather extensively punctured. The spots with yellow hairs. The elytra are striated, with the intervals alternately narrow and wide and with erect yellow setae originating from coarser punctures, marked in the bands as small bare spots. A basal band, a median band, a middle band, a short transverse band behind the middle, and an indistinct terminal band consist of yellow setae. The underside is entirely yellow and covered with hairs.
