= Trioserica theinzek =

Scientific classification
- Kingdom: Animalia
- Phylum: Arthropoda
- Class: Insecta
- Order: Coleoptera
- Suborder: Polyphaga
- Infraorder: Scarabaeiformia
- Family: Scarabaeidae
- Genus: Trioserica
- Species: T. theinzek

Binomial name
- Trioserica theinzek Ahrens, Lukic & Pham, 2024

Species of beetle

Trioserica theinzek is a species of beetle of the family Scarabaeidae. It is found in Myanmar.

== Description ==
Adults reach a length of about 6.2 mm. They have a dark yellowish brown, oblong body, with numerous small dark spots. The antennae and ventral surface are yellow. The dorsal surface is dull and the surface is almost glabrous.

== Etymology ==
The species is named after its type locality.
