= Trioserica vriesi =

Scientific classification
- Kingdom: Animalia
- Phylum: Arthropoda
- Class: Insecta
- Order: Coleoptera
- Suborder: Polyphaga
- Infraorder: Scarabaeiformia
- Family: Scarabaeidae
- Genus: Trioserica
- Species: T. vriesi

Binomial name
- Trioserica vriesi Ahrens, Lukic & Pham, 2024

Species of beetle

Trioserica vriesi is a species of beetle of the family Scarabaeidae. It is found in Vietnam.

== Description ==
Adults reach a length of about 5.9–6 mm. They have a dark brown, oblong body. The legs, ventral surface, labroclypeus and elytral striae are red brown and the antennae are yellow. The dorsal surface is dull and the surface is almost glabrous.

== Etymology ==
The species is named after one of its collectors, R. de Vries.
