= Trioserica khaoyai =

Scientific classification
- Kingdom: Animalia
- Phylum: Arthropoda
- Class: Insecta
- Order: Coleoptera
- Suborder: Polyphaga
- Infraorder: Scarabaeiformia
- Family: Scarabaeidae
- Genus: Trioserica
- Species: T. khaoyai

Binomial name
- Trioserica khaoyai Ahrens, Lukic & Pham, 2024

Species of beetle

Trioserica khaoyai is a species of beetle of the family Scarabaeidae. It is found in Thailand.

== Description ==
Adults reach a length of about 6.2–6.5 mm. They have a yellowish brown, oblong body, with numerous small dark spots. The apex of the scutellum and frons are darker, with a green iridescent shine. The antennae are yellow. The dorsal surface is dull and the surface is almost glabrous.

== Etymology ==
The species is named after its type locality, Khao Yai National Park.
