= Trioserica seideli =

Scientific classification
- Kingdom: Animalia
- Phylum: Arthropoda
- Class: Insecta
- Order: Coleoptera
- Suborder: Polyphaga
- Infraorder: Scarabaeiformia
- Family: Scarabaeidae
- Genus: Trioserica
- Species: T. seideli

Binomial name
- Trioserica seideli Ahrens, Lukic & Pham, 2024

Species of beetle

Trioserica seideli is a species of beetle of the family Scarabaeidae. It is found in Myanmar.

== Description ==
Adults reach a length of about 5.7–6.6 mm. They have a yellowish brown, oblong body, with numerous small dark spots. The antennae are yellow. The dorsal surface is dull and the surface is almost glabrous.

== Etymology ==
The species is dedicated to Matthias Seidel, who made the specimens available for study.
