= Trioserica chuyangsin =

Scientific classification
- Kingdom: Animalia
- Phylum: Arthropoda
- Class: Insecta
- Order: Coleoptera
- Suborder: Polyphaga
- Infraorder: Scarabaeiformia
- Family: Scarabaeidae
- Genus: Trioserica
- Species: T. chuyangsin

Binomial name
- Trioserica chuyangsin Ahrens, Lukic & Pham, 2024

Species of beetle

Trioserica chuyangsin is a species of beetle of the family Scarabaeidae. It is found in Vietnam.

== Description ==
Adults reach a length of about 5.8 mm. They have a light reddish brown, oblong body. The frons and pronotum are darker brown and the elytra have indistinct, small dark spots. The antennae are yellow. The dorsal surface is dull and the surface is almost glabrous.

== Etymology ==
The species is named after its type locality, Chu Yang Sin national park.
