= Trioserica tongbiguan =

Scientific classification
- Kingdom: Animalia
- Phylum: Arthropoda
- Class: Insecta
- Order: Coleoptera
- Suborder: Polyphaga
- Infraorder: Scarabaeiformia
- Family: Scarabaeidae
- Genus: Trioserica
- Species: T. tongbiguan

Binomial name
- Trioserica tongbiguan Ahrens, Lukic & Pham, 2024

Species of beetle

Trioserica tongbiguan is a species of beetle of the family Scarabaeidae. It is found in China (Yunnan).

== Description ==
Adults reach a length of about 5.4–6.1 mm. They have a yellowish brown, oblong body, with small dark spots on the elytra and two large, indistinct spots on the pronotum. The antennae and ventral surface are yellow. The dorsal surface is dull and the surface is almost glabrous.

== Etymology ==
The species is named after its type locality, Tongbiguan village.
