= Isonychus cervinus =

Scientific classification
- Kingdom: Animalia
- Phylum: Arthropoda
- Class: Insecta
- Order: Coleoptera
- Suborder: Polyphaga
- Infraorder: Scarabaeiformia
- Family: Scarabaeidae
- Genus: Isonychus
- Species: I. cervinus

Binomial name
- Isonychus cervinus Erichson, 1847

Synonyms
- Isonychus abdominalis Moser, 1918; Isonychus fuscescens Blanchard, 1850

Species of beetle

Isonychus cervinus is a species of beetle of the family Scarabaeidae. It is found in Bolivia and Peru.

== Description ==
Adults reach a length of about 7–8 mm. They are brown with grey hairs. The antennae are yellowish-brown. The pronotum and scutellum are very densely punctured, with grey hairs on the punctures. The elytra have longitudinal striations, with the intervals between them alternately narrow and wide. On the narrow intervals, there are scattered small spots of lighter hairs. The underside is moderately densely covered with grey hairs.
