= Isonychus scutellaris =

Scientific classification
- Kingdom: Animalia
- Phylum: Arthropoda
- Clade: Pancrustacea
- Class: Insecta
- Order: Coleoptera
- Suborder: Polyphaga
- Infraorder: Scarabaeiformia
- Family: Scarabaeidae
- Genus: Isonychus
- Species: I. scutellaris

Binomial name
- Isonychus scutellaris Moser, 1918

Species of beetle

Isonychus scutellaris is a species of beetle of the family Scarabaeidae. It is found in Colombia.

== Description ==
Adults reach a length of about 11–12 mm. They are brown, the surface densely covered with grey hairs. The antennae are reddish-yellow. The pronotum is very densely punctate, the punctures with yellowish-grey hairs, but also some erect darker hairs. The elytra are striated and covered with yellowish-grey hairs and some short erect hairs. They show irregular lighter and darker spots and are marked in particular by two larger blackish-brown spots behind the middle next to the suture.
