= Isonychus striatipennis =

Scientific classification
- Kingdom: Animalia
- Phylum: Arthropoda
- Clade: Pancrustacea
- Class: Insecta
- Order: Coleoptera
- Suborder: Polyphaga
- Infraorder: Scarabaeiformia
- Family: Scarabaeidae
- Genus: Isonychus
- Species: I. striatipennis

Binomial name
- Isonychus striatipennis Moser, 1918

Species of beetle

Isonychus striatipennis is a species of beetle of the family Scarabaeidae. It is found in Mexico (Jalisco).

== Description ==
Adults reach a length of about 10–11 mm. They are brown, but the base colour is almost entirely obscured by the dense covering of grey setae. The antennae are yellowish-red, with a blackish-brown club. On the elytra, the striae are very distinctly marked. The legs are reddish-brown and have finer and more extensive hair than the underside of the body.
