= Trioserica pakse =

Scientific classification
- Kingdom: Animalia
- Phylum: Arthropoda
- Class: Insecta
- Order: Coleoptera
- Suborder: Polyphaga
- Infraorder: Scarabaeiformia
- Family: Scarabaeidae
- Genus: Trioserica
- Species: T. pakse

Binomial name
- Trioserica pakse Ahrens, Lukic & Pham, 2024

Species of beetle

Trioserica pakse is a species of beetle of the family Scarabaeidae. It is found in Laos.

== Description ==
Adults reach a length of about 5.1 mm. They have a dark brown, oblong body, with inconspicuous dark spots. The antennae are yellow. The dorsal surface is dull and partly iridescent. The surface is almost glabrous.

== Etymology ==
The species is named after its type locality, Pakse.
