= Isonychus fraternus =

Scientific classification
- Kingdom: Animalia
- Phylum: Arthropoda
- Clade: Pancrustacea
- Class: Insecta
- Order: Coleoptera
- Suborder: Polyphaga
- Infraorder: Scarabaeiformia
- Family: Scarabaeidae
- Genus: Isonychus
- Species: I. fraternus

Binomial name
- Isonychus fraternus Moser, 1918

Species of beetle

Isonychus fraternus is a species of beetle of the family Scarabaeidae. It is found in Bolivia.

== Description ==
Adults reach a length of about 5.5–6 mm. They are brown, while the elytra and sometimes also the abdomen, are black. Both the upper and lower surfaces are densely covered with greenish-yellow scales. The frons is punctured and covered with yellowish setae. The antennae are reddish-brown, with a blackish-brown club. At the end of the elytra, there is usually a small white spot.
