= Trioserica lamdongensis =

Scientific classification
- Kingdom: Animalia
- Phylum: Arthropoda
- Class: Insecta
- Order: Coleoptera
- Suborder: Polyphaga
- Infraorder: Scarabaeiformia
- Family: Scarabaeidae
- Genus: Trioserica
- Species: T. lamdongensis

Binomial name
- Trioserica lamdongensis Ahrens, Lukic & Pham, 2024

Species of beetle

Trioserica lamdongensis is a species of beetle of the family Scarabaeidae. It is found in Vietnam.

== Description ==
Adults reach a length of about 6.6 mm. They have a yellowish brown, oblong body, with small dark spots on the scutellum, elytra and pronotum. The antennae are yellow. The dorsal surface is dull, partly with a green, iridescent shine, and the surface is almost glabrous.

== Etymology ==
The species is named after its occurrence in the Lam Dong province.
