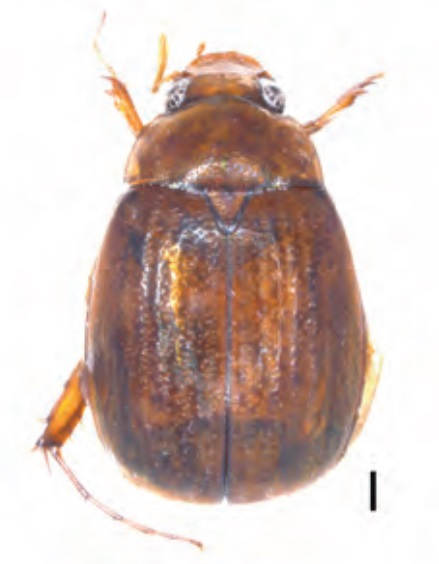

Scientific classification
- Kingdom: Animalia
- Phylum: Arthropoda
- Class: Insecta
- Order: Coleoptera
- Suborder: Polyphaga
- Infraorder: Scarabaeiformia
- Family: Scarabaeidae
- Genus: Trioserica
- Species: T. tarsata

Binomial name
- Trioserica tarsata (Brenske, 1894)

Synonyms
- Serica tarsata Brenske, 1894; Autoserica tarsata

= Trioserica tarsata =

Species of beetle

Trioserica tarsata is a species of beetle of the family Scarabaeidae. It is found in India (Meghalaya, West Bengal) and Bhutan.

== Description ==
Adults reach a length of about 6.4-6.5 mm. They have an oval body. The upper surface is light reddish-brown with dark spots on the pronotum and elytra. The underside is light brown. The dorsal surface is dull, partly iridescent and mostly glabrous, except for some lateral cilia and some setae on the head.
