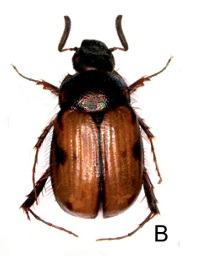

Scientific classification
- Kingdom: Animalia
- Phylum: Arthropoda
- Class: Insecta
- Order: Coleoptera
- Suborder: Polyphaga
- Infraorder: Scarabaeiformia
- Family: Scarabaeidae
- Genus: Periserica
- Species: P. interrupta

Binomial name
- Periserica interrupta (Walker, 1859)

Synonyms
- Omaloplia interrupta Walker, 1859

= Periserica interrupta =

Species of beetle

Periserica interrupta is a species of beetle of the family Scarabaeidae. It is found in Sri Lanka.

== Description ==
Adults reach a length of about 5.7–5.8 mm. They have a dark brown to blackish, oval body, with blackish antennae. The elytra are yellowish brown with small dark spots. The dorsal surface is shiny and densely setose on the head, but sparsely setose on the pronotum and elytra.
