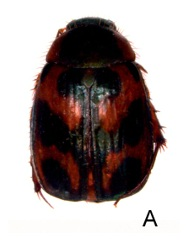

Scientific classification
- Kingdom: Animalia
- Phylum: Arthropoda
- Class: Insecta
- Order: Coleoptera
- Suborder: Polyphaga
- Infraorder: Scarabaeiformia
- Family: Scarabaeidae
- Genus: Periserica
- Species: P. picta

Binomial name
- Periserica picta Brenske, 1898

= Periserica picta =

Species of beetle

Periserica picta is a species of beetle of the family Scarabaeidae. It is found in Sri Lanka.

== Description ==
Adults reach a length of about 7.5–8.5 mm. They have a reddish brown, oval body, with yellowish brown antenna. The elytra are yellowish brown with blackish sutural and lateral margins and dark spots. The dorsal surface is moderately shiny and nearly glabrous.
