= Trioserica rugosa =

Scientific classification
- Kingdom: Animalia
- Phylum: Arthropoda
- Class: Insecta
- Order: Coleoptera
- Suborder: Polyphaga
- Infraorder: Scarabaeiformia
- Family: Scarabaeidae
- Genus: Trioserica
- Species: T. rugosa

Binomial name
- Trioserica rugosa (Brenske, 1899)

Synonyms
- Neoserica rugosa Brenske, 1899

Species of beetle

Trioserica rugosa is a species of beetle of the family Scarabaeidae. It is found in Myanmar.

== Description ==
Adults reach a length of about 5.8 mm. They have a brown, oblong, body. The elytra are yellowish brown with small dark spots and the antennae are yellow. The dorsal surface has an iridescent greenish shine (especially in dark brown areas) and the surface is almost glabrous.
