= Isonychus lindemannae =

Scientific classification
- Kingdom: Animalia
- Phylum: Arthropoda
- Class: Insecta
- Order: Coleoptera
- Suborder: Polyphaga
- Infraorder: Scarabaeiformia
- Family: Scarabaeidae
- Genus: Isonychus
- Species: I. lindemannae

Binomial name
- Isonychus lindemannae Frey, 1974

Species of beetle

Isonychus lindemannae is a species of beetle of the family Scarabaeidae. It is found in Brazil (Amazonas).

== Description ==
Adults reach a length of about 6 mm. The upper and lower surfaces, as well as the antennae are brown. The back of the head and the entire rest of the body is covered with brownish scales and setae. There are narrow, scale-free striae on the elytra.
