= Trioserica tenasserim =

Scientific classification
- Kingdom: Animalia
- Phylum: Arthropoda
- Class: Insecta
- Order: Coleoptera
- Suborder: Polyphaga
- Infraorder: Scarabaeiformia
- Family: Scarabaeidae
- Genus: Trioserica
- Species: T. tenasserim

Binomial name
- Trioserica tenasserim Ahrens, Lukic & Pham, 2024

Species of beetle

Trioserica tenasserim is a species of beetle of the family Scarabaeidae. It is found in Myanmar.

== Description ==
Adults reach a length of about 5 mm. They have a yellowish brown, oblong body, with numerous small dark spots. The antennae are yellow. The dorsal surface is dull, partly with an iridescent greenish shine (particularly in the dark spots) and the surface is almost glabrous.

== Etymology ==
The species is named after its known present occurrence, in the Tenasserim.
