= Trioserica =

Scientific classification
- Kingdom: Animalia
- Phylum: Arthropoda
- Clade: Pancrustacea
- Class: Insecta
- Order: Coleoptera
- Suborder: Polyphaga
- Infraorder: Scarabaeiformia
- Family: Scarabaeidae
- Subfamily: Sericinae
- Tribe: Sericini
- Genus: Trioserica; Moser, 1922

Synonyms
- Sinoserica Miyake & Yamaya, 2001

Genus of leaf beetles

Trioserica is a genus of beetles belonging to the family Scarabaeidae.

== Species ==
There are 61 recognized species:

- Trioserica achterbergi Ahrens, Lukic & Pham, 2024
- Trioserica alternata (Nomura, 1974)
- Trioserica antennalis (Nomura, 1974)
- Trioserica bachma Ahrens, Lukic & Pham, 2024
- Trioserica bansongcha Ahrens, Lukic & Pham, 2024
- Trioserica bresseeli Ahrens, Lukic & Pham, 2024
- Trioserica cangyuanensis Ahrens, Liu & Fabrizi, 2021
- Trioserica chaudoc Ahrens, Lukic & Pham, 2024
- Trioserica chaweewanae Ahrens, Lukic & Pham, 2024
- Trioserica chumomray Ahrens, Lukic & Pham, 2024
- Trioserica chuyangsin Ahrens, Lukic & Pham, 2024
- Trioserica csorbai Ahrens, Lukic & Pham, 2024
- Trioserica dalat Ahrens, Lukic & Pham, 2024
- Trioserica daweishana Ahrens, Liu & Fabrizi, 2021
- Trioserica dinghushanica Ahrens, Liu & Fabrizi, 2021
- Trioserica dongnai Ahrens, Lukic & Pham, 2024
- Trioserica geiseri Ahrens, Lukic & Pham, 2024
- Trioserica guerlachi Ahrens, Lukic & Pham, 2024
- Trioserica hartmanni Ahrens, Lukic & Pham, 2024
- Trioserica huaypok Ahrens, Lukic & Pham, 2024
- Trioserica khaoyai Ahrens, Lukic & Pham, 2024
- Trioserica kokut Ahrens & Pham, 2025
- Trioserica konplongensis Ahrens, Lukic & Pham, 2024
- Trioserica lamdongensis Ahrens, Lukic & Pham, 2024
- Trioserica lepichaeta Moser, 1922
- Trioserica lilongensis Ahrens, Liu & Fabrizi, 2021
- Trioserica macrophthalma (Moser, 1918)
- Trioserica maculata (Frey, 1972)
- Trioserica maculipennis (Miyake & Yamaya, 2001)
- Trioserica minima (Frey, 1972)
- Trioserica namphak Ahrens, Lukic & Pham, 2024
- Trioserica nongfa Ahrens, Lukic & Pham, 2024
- Trioserica pahinngam Ahrens, Lukic & Pham, 2024
- Trioserica pakse Ahrens, Lukic & Pham, 2024
- Trioserica paulseni Ahrens, Lukic & Pham, 2024
- Trioserica phataem Ahrens, Lukic & Pham, 2024
- Trioserica phetchabun Ahrens, Lukic & Pham, 2024
- Trioserica phnomkulen Ahrens, Lukic & Pham, 2024
- Trioserica phuphan Ahrens, Lukic & Pham, 2024
- Trioserica pongpitaki Ahrens, Lukic & Pham, 2024
- Trioserica preahkhan Ahrens, Lukic & Pham, 2024
- Trioserica prome Ahrens, Lukic & Pham, 2024
- Trioserica rugosa (Brenske, 1899)
- Trioserica samoeng Ahrens, Lukic & Pham, 2024
- Trioserica sanogae Ahrens, Lukic & Pham, 2024
- Trioserica seideli Ahrens, Lukic & Pham, 2024
- Trioserica sekongensis Ahrens, Lukic & Pham, 2024
- Trioserica shimen Liu, Ahrens, Li & Yang, 2024
- Trioserica shiyiduiensis Ahrens, Liu & Fabrizi, 2021
- Trioserica skalei Ahrens, Lukic & Pham, 2024
- Trioserica sparsesquamosa Moser, 1922
- Trioserica tadfaek Ahrens, Lukic & Pham, 2024
- Trioserica taipeiensis Kobayashi, 2013
- Trioserica tarsata (Brenske, 1894)
- Trioserica tenasserim Ahrens, Lukic & Pham, 2024
- Trioserica theinzek Ahrens, Lukic & Pham, 2024
- Trioserica tongbiguan Ahrens, Lukic & Pham, 2024
- Trioserica trifoliata Moser, 1922
- Trioserica vientiane Ahrens, Lukic & Pham, 2024
- Trioserica vriesi Ahrens, Lukic & Pham, 2024
- Trioserica vuquang Ahrens, Lukic & Pham, 2024
