= Trioserica maculata =

Scientific classification
- Kingdom: Animalia
- Phylum: Arthropoda
- Class: Insecta
- Order: Coleoptera
- Suborder: Polyphaga
- Infraorder: Scarabaeiformia
- Family: Scarabaeidae
- Genus: Trioserica
- Species: T. maculata

Binomial name
- Trioserica maculata (Frey, 1972)

Synonyms
- Neoserica maculata Frey, 1972

Species of beetle

Trioserica maculata is a species of beetle of the family Scarabaeidae. It is found in Laos and Vietnam.

== Description ==
Adults reach a length of about 6.4–7 mm. They have a yellowish brown, oblong body, with numerous small dark spots. The antennae are yellow. The dorsal surface is dull, and the surface is almost glabrous.
