= Trioserica achterbergi =

Scientific classification
- Kingdom: Animalia
- Phylum: Arthropoda
- Class: Insecta
- Order: Coleoptera
- Suborder: Polyphaga
- Infraorder: Scarabaeiformia
- Family: Scarabaeidae
- Genus: Trioserica
- Species: T. achterbergi

Binomial name
- Trioserica achterbergi Ahrens, Lukic & Pham, 2024

Species of beetle

Trioserica achterbergi is a species of beetle of the family Scarabaeidae. It is found in Vietnam.

== Description ==
Adults reach a length of about 6.6–7.1 mm. They have a reddish brown, oblong body. The pronotum, scutellum and elytra have numerous small to more widely extended, dark spots or stripes. The antennae are yellow. The dorsal surface has a green shine and the surface is almost glabrous.

== Etymology ==
The species is named after one of its collectors, C.v. Achterberg.
