= Trioserica dinghushanica =

Scientific classification
- Kingdom: Animalia
- Phylum: Arthropoda
- Class: Insecta
- Order: Coleoptera
- Suborder: Polyphaga
- Infraorder: Scarabaeiformia
- Family: Scarabaeidae
- Genus: Trioserica
- Species: T. dinghushanica

Binomial name
- Trioserica dinghushanica Ahrens, Liu & Fabrizi, 2021

Species of beetle

Trioserica dinghushanica is a species of beetle of the family Scarabaeidae. It is found in China (Guangdong).

== Description ==
Adults reach a length of about 6.5–7.4 mm. They have a yellowish brown, oblong body, with yellow antennae. The dorsal surface has small dark spots and is moderately dull and almost glabrous.

== Etymology ==
The species is named after its occurrence in the Dinghushan mountains.
