= Trioserica shiyiduiensis =

Scientific classification
- Kingdom: Animalia
- Phylum: Arthropoda
- Class: Insecta
- Order: Coleoptera
- Suborder: Polyphaga
- Infraorder: Scarabaeiformia
- Family: Scarabaeidae
- Genus: Trioserica
- Species: T. shiyiduiensis

Binomial name
- Trioserica shiyiduiensis Ahrens, Liu & Fabrizi, 2021

Species of beetle

Trioserica shiyiduiensis is a species of beetle of the family Scarabaeidae. It is found in China (Yunnan), Laos and Thailand.

== Description ==
Adults reach a length of about 6.1–7.1 mm. They have a yellowish brown, oblong body, with yellow antennae. The dorsal surface has small or larger dark spots and is dull and almost glabrous.

== Etymology ==
The species is named after its type locality, Shiyidui.
