= Isonychus costaricensis =

Scientific classification
- Kingdom: Animalia
- Phylum: Arthropoda
- Clade: Pancrustacea
- Class: Insecta
- Order: Coleoptera
- Suborder: Polyphaga
- Infraorder: Scarabaeiformia
- Family: Scarabaeidae
- Genus: Isonychus
- Species: I. costaricensis

Binomial name
- Isonychus costaricensis Moser, 1918

Species of beetle

Isonychus costaricensis is a species of beetle of the family Scarabaeidae. It is found in Costa Rica.

== Description ==
Adults reach a length of about 5.5 mm. They have an oblong-oval body. The frons has punctures which are covered with brown, scale-like setae, although some (particularly in the anterior part) are yellow. The antennae are brown, with a darker club. The pronotum is moderately densely covered with punctures and the scale-like setae of the punctures are brown, while they are yellow on the sides of the pronotum. The elytra are striated. There are brown bristle-like scales, but they are not very densely packed. There are also scattered yellowish scales and, at the end of the elytra, a transverse strip of white scales on each side.
