= Trioserica geiseri =

Scientific classification
- Kingdom: Animalia
- Phylum: Arthropoda
- Class: Insecta
- Order: Coleoptera
- Suborder: Polyphaga
- Infraorder: Scarabaeiformia
- Family: Scarabaeidae
- Genus: Trioserica
- Species: T. geiseri

Binomial name
- Trioserica geiseri Ahrens, Lukic & Pham, 2024

Species of beetle

Trioserica geiseri is a species of beetle of the family Scarabaeidae. It is found in Vietnam and Laos.

== Description ==
Adults reach a length of about 7.4–7.5 mm. They have a yellowish brown, oval body, with small, dark spots on the pronotum, scutellum, and elytra. The frons is dark brown with a greenish dull toment and the antennae are yellow. The dorsal surface is dull, partly with an iridescent green shine and the surface is almost glabrous.

== Etymology ==
The species is named after its collector, Michael Geiser.
