= Trioserica shimen =

Scientific classification
- Kingdom: Animalia
- Phylum: Arthropoda
- Class: Insecta
- Order: Coleoptera
- Suborder: Polyphaga
- Infraorder: Scarabaeiformia
- Family: Scarabaeidae
- Genus: Trioserica
- Species: T. shimen

Binomial name
- Trioserica shimen Liu, Ahrens, Li & Yang, 2024

Species of beetle

Trioserica shimen is a species of beetle of the family Scarabaeidae. It is found in China (Guangdong).

== Description ==
Adults reach a length of about 7 mm. They have a yellowish brown, oblong body, with numerous small dark spots. The dorsal surface is dark brown, dull and almost glabrous and the antennae are yellow.

== Etymology ==
The species is named after the type locality, Shimen Terrace.
