= Isonychus pulchellus =

Scientific classification
- Kingdom: Animalia
- Phylum: Arthropoda
- Clade: Pancrustacea
- Class: Insecta
- Order: Coleoptera
- Suborder: Polyphaga
- Infraorder: Scarabaeiformia
- Family: Scarabaeidae
- Genus: Isonychus
- Species: I. pulchellus

Binomial name
- Isonychus pulchellus Moser, 1918

Species of beetle

Isonychus pulchellus is a species of beetle of the family Scarabaeidae. It is found in Peru.

== Description ==
Adults reach a length of about 6 mm. They are yellowish-red and densely covered with scales above and below. The frons has yellow and brown scales and the antennae are yellowish-brown, with a black club. The pronotum is covered with yellowish-white scales, a large central blackish-brown spot bears scattered light scales. On the elytra, the scales are blackish-brown, and the elytra are also speckled with numerous brown and white scales. On the underside, the scales are white, with individual yellowish spots along the sides.
