= Isonychus parvulus =

Scientific classification
- Kingdom: Animalia
- Phylum: Arthropoda
- Clade: Pancrustacea
- Class: Insecta
- Order: Coleoptera
- Suborder: Polyphaga
- Infraorder: Scarabaeiformia
- Family: Scarabaeidae
- Genus: Isonychus
- Species: I. parvulus

Binomial name
- Isonychus parvulus Moser, 1918

Species of beetle

Isonychus parvulus is a species of beetle of the family Scarabaeidae. It is found in Bolivia.

== Description ==
Adults reach a length of about 3.5–4 mm. They have a black, shiny short, egg-shaped body. The upper surface is almost glabrous. In some specimens, the basal half of the elytra is yellowish-brown except for the suture. The head is punctate, the frons covered with grey hairs. The antennae are blackish-brown, with the club darker. The pronotum is rather sparsely punctate, the punctures with grey hairs, except for those on the middle of the disc. The lateral margins of the pronotum are fringed with hairs. The elytra are striate and not hairy. The underside is very sparsely covered with grey hairs and the legs are blackish-brown.
