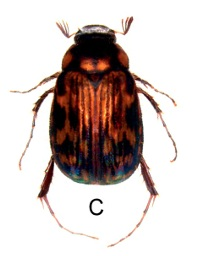

Scientific classification
- Kingdom: Animalia
- Phylum: Arthropoda
- Class: Insecta
- Order: Coleoptera
- Suborder: Polyphaga
- Infraorder: Scarabaeiformia
- Family: Scarabaeidae
- Genus: Periserica
- Species: P. fulvostriata

Binomial name
- Periserica fulvostriata Brenske, 1898

Synonyms
- Periserica picta var. fulvostriata Brenske, 1898; Periserica nigripennis Arrow, 1916

= Periserica fulvostriata =

Species of beetle

Periserica fulvostriata is a species of beetle of the family Scarabaeidae. It is found in Sri Lanka.

== Description ==
Adults reach a length of about 6.6 mm. They have a dark brown, oval body, with the base and sides of the pronotum and the elytra yellowish brown. The dorsal surface is shiny, sparsely setose and has an iridescent shine.
