= Trioserica minima =

Scientific classification
- Kingdom: Animalia
- Phylum: Arthropoda
- Class: Insecta
- Order: Coleoptera
- Suborder: Polyphaga
- Infraorder: Scarabaeiformia
- Family: Scarabaeidae
- Genus: Trioserica
- Species: T. minima

Binomial name
- Trioserica minima (Frey, 1972)

Synonyms
- Neoserica minima Frey, 1972

Species of beetle

Trioserica minima is a species of beetle of the family Scarabaeidae. It is found in Laos.

== Description ==
Adults reach a length of about 5.6 mm. They have an oblong body. The dorsal surface is uniformly dark brown, while the ventral surface is red-brown. The antennae are yellow. The dorsal surface is dull and partly iridescent and partly simply shiny. The surface is almost glabrous.
