= Trioserica bachma =

Scientific classification
- Kingdom: Animalia
- Phylum: Arthropoda
- Class: Insecta
- Order: Coleoptera
- Suborder: Polyphaga
- Infraorder: Scarabaeiformia
- Family: Scarabaeidae
- Genus: Trioserica
- Species: T. bachma

Binomial name
- Trioserica bachma Ahrens, Lukic & Pham, 2024

Species of beetle

Trioserica bachma is a species of beetle of the family Scarabaeidae. It is found in Vietnam.

== Description ==
Adults reach a length of about 7.4 mm. They have a yellowish brown, oblong body. The pronotum is red and there are small dark spots on the elytra and pronotum. The frons is dark brown and the antennae are yellow. The dorsal surface dull, partly with a green, iridescent shine, and the surface is almost glabrous.

== Etymology ==
The species is named after its type locality, Bach Ma national park.
