= Trioserica phnomkulen =

Scientific classification
- Kingdom: Animalia
- Phylum: Arthropoda
- Class: Insecta
- Order: Coleoptera
- Suborder: Polyphaga
- Infraorder: Scarabaeiformia
- Family: Scarabaeidae
- Genus: Trioserica
- Species: T. phnomkulen

Binomial name
- Trioserica phnomkulen Ahrens, Lukic & Pham, 2024

Species of beetle

Trioserica phnomkulen is a species of beetle of the family Scarabaeidae. It is found in Cambodia.

== Description ==
Adults reach a length of about 6.9–7.1 mm. They have a short oval body. The dorsal surface is dark brown and the ventral surface is red brown. The labroclypeus and some spots on the elytra (particularly the striae) are a little lighter and the antennae are yellow. The dorsal surface is dull and partly weakly shiny. The surface is almost glabrous.

== Etymology ==
The species is named after its type locality, Phnom Kulen.
