= Trioserica sanogae =

Scientific classification
- Kingdom: Animalia
- Phylum: Arthropoda
- Class: Insecta
- Order: Coleoptera
- Suborder: Polyphaga
- Infraorder: Scarabaeiformia
- Family: Scarabaeidae
- Genus: Trioserica
- Species: T. sanogae

Binomial name
- Trioserica sanogae Ahrens, Lukic & Pham, 2024

Species of beetle

Trioserica sanogae is a species of beetle of the family Scarabaeidae. It is found in Thailand.

== Description ==
Adults reach a length of about 6.1–6.4 mm. They have a reddish brown, oblong body. The frons and pronotum are dark brown and the elytra have small dark spots. The antennae are yellow. The dorsal surface is dull and the surface is almost glabrous.

== Etymology ==
The species is named after one of its collectors, Katae Sa-nog.
