= Isonychus caudiculatus =

Scientific classification
- Kingdom: Animalia
- Phylum: Arthropoda
- Clade: Pancrustacea
- Class: Insecta
- Order: Coleoptera
- Suborder: Polyphaga
- Infraorder: Scarabaeiformia
- Family: Scarabaeidae
- Genus: Isonychus
- Species: I. caudiculatus

Binomial name
- Isonychus caudiculatus Moser, 1918

Species of beetle

Isonychus caudiculatus is a species of beetle of the family Scarabaeidae. It is found in Brazil (Minas Gerais).

== Description ==
Adults reach a length of about 7 mm. They are reddish-yellow and densely covered with greenish-yellow scales. The antennae are yellowish-red, with a black club. Due to the dense scaling, the paired striae on the elytra are only indistinctly visible. The underside is densely covered with greenish-yellow scales, except for the middle of the abdomen, which is covered with erect yellow hairs.
