= Trioserica nongfa =

Scientific classification
- Kingdom: Animalia
- Phylum: Arthropoda
- Class: Insecta
- Order: Coleoptera
- Suborder: Polyphaga
- Infraorder: Scarabaeiformia
- Family: Scarabaeidae
- Genus: Trioserica
- Species: T. nongfa

Binomial name
- Trioserica nongfa Ahrens, Lukic & Pham, 2024

Species of beetle

Trioserica nongfa is a species of beetle of the family Scarabaeidae. It is found in Laos.

== Description ==
Adults reach a length of about 6–7.2 mm. They have a yellowish brown, oblong body, with small dark spots on the elytra and pronotum. The antennae and ventral surface are yellow, and the dorsal surface is dull. The surface is almost glabrous.

== Etymology ==
The species is named after its type locality, Nong Fa.
