= Trioserica macrophthalma =

Scientific classification
- Kingdom: Animalia
- Phylum: Arthropoda
- Clade: Pancrustacea
- Class: Insecta
- Order: Coleoptera
- Suborder: Polyphaga
- Infraorder: Scarabaeiformia
- Family: Scarabaeidae
- Genus: Trioserica
- Species: T. macrophthalma

Binomial name
- Trioserica macrophthalma (Moser, 1918)

Synonyms
- Neoserica macrophthalma Moser, 1918; Selaserica rufocastanea Kobayashi, 1980

Species of beetle

Trioserica macrophthalma is a species of beetle of the family Scarabaeidae. It is found in Taiwan.

== Description ==
Adults reach a length of about 7 mm. They are dull and brown, but often blackish-brown above. The head is weakly punctate and the antennae are yellowish-brown. The pronotum is densely and finely punctate. The elytra are punctate, with narrow ribs without puctures.
