= Trioserica dalat =

Scientific classification
- Kingdom: Animalia
- Phylum: Arthropoda
- Class: Insecta
- Order: Coleoptera
- Suborder: Polyphaga
- Infraorder: Scarabaeiformia
- Family: Scarabaeidae
- Genus: Trioserica
- Species: T. dalat

Binomial name
- Trioserica dalat Ahrens, Lukic & Pham, 2024

Species of beetle

Trioserica dalat is a species of beetle of the family Scarabaeidae. It is found in Vietnam.

== Description ==
Adults reach a length of about 6.2 mm. They have a yellow, oblong body, with a few small darker spots. The antennae are yellow. The dorsal surface is dull and the surface is almost glabrous.

== Etymology ==
The species is named after its occurrence close to the city of Dalat.
