= Trioserica hartmanni =

Scientific classification
- Kingdom: Animalia
- Phylum: Arthropoda
- Class: Insecta
- Order: Coleoptera
- Suborder: Polyphaga
- Infraorder: Scarabaeiformia
- Family: Scarabaeidae
- Genus: Trioserica
- Species: T. hartmanni

Binomial name
- Trioserica hartmanni Ahrens, Lukic & Pham, 2024

Species of beetle

Trioserica hartmanni is a species of beetle of the family Scarabaeidae. It is found in Vietnam.

== Description ==
Adults reach a length of about 8.2–9.4 mm. They have a yellow brown, oblong body, with inconspicuous dark spots. The antennae are yellow, while the frons and scutellum are dark brown. The dorsal surface is dull and partly iridescent. The surface is almost glabrous.

== Etymology ==
The species is named after its collector, M. Hartmann.
