= Trioserica samoeng =

Scientific classification
- Kingdom: Animalia
- Phylum: Arthropoda
- Class: Insecta
- Order: Coleoptera
- Suborder: Polyphaga
- Infraorder: Scarabaeiformia
- Family: Scarabaeidae
- Genus: Trioserica
- Species: T. samoeng

Binomial name
- Trioserica samoeng Ahrens, Lukic & Pham, 2024

Species of beetle

Trioserica samoeng is a species of beetle of the family Scarabaeidae. It is found in Thailand.

== Description ==
Adults reach a length of about 6.1 mm. They have a short oval body. The dorsal surface is dark brown and the ventral surface is red brown. The labroclypeus and numerous spots (especially in the punctures on the elytra) are light brown, while the antennae are yellow. The dorsal surface is dull and the surface is almost glabrous.

== Etymology ==
The species is named after its occurrence in Samoeng district.
