= Trioserica paulseni =

Scientific classification
- Kingdom: Animalia
- Phylum: Arthropoda
- Class: Insecta
- Order: Coleoptera
- Suborder: Polyphaga
- Infraorder: Scarabaeiformia
- Family: Scarabaeidae
- Genus: Trioserica
- Species: T. paulseni

Binomial name
- Trioserica paulseni Ahrens, Lukic & Pham, 2024

Species of beetle

Trioserica paulseni is a species of beetle of the family Scarabaeidae. It is found in Thailand.

== Description ==
Adults reach a length of about 5.8 mm. They have a yellow, oblong-oval body. The elytra has numerous small dark spots and the pronotum has a larger brown spot on each side. The antennae and ventral surface are yellow and the frons is brown. The dorsal surface is dull and partly iridescent and the surface is almost glabrous.

== Etymology ==
The species is dedicated to Matt Paulsen.
