= Periserica =

Scientific classification
- Kingdom: Animalia
- Phylum: Arthropoda
- Class: Insecta
- Order: Coleoptera
- Suborder: Polyphaga
- Infraorder: Scarabaeiformia
- Family: Scarabaeidae
- Tribe: Sericini
- Genus: Periserica; Brenske, 1898

Genus of beetles

Periserica is a genus of beetles in the family Scarabaeidae.

== Species ==
- Periserica densipunctata Fabrizi & Ahrens, 2014
- Periserica fulvostriata Brenske, 1898
- Periserica gilimalensis Fabrizi & Ahrens, 2014
- Periserica interrupta (Walker, 1859)
- Periserica picta Brenske, 1898
- Periserica subsignata (Walker, 1859)
- Periserica triflabellata Fabrizi & Ahrens, 2014
- Periserica zamboangensis Moser, 1917
