= Isonychus setifer =

Scientific classification
- Kingdom: Animalia
- Phylum: Arthropoda
- Clade: Pancrustacea
- Class: Insecta
- Order: Coleoptera
- Suborder: Polyphaga
- Infraorder: Scarabaeiformia
- Family: Scarabaeidae
- Genus: Isonychus
- Species: I. setifer

Binomial name
- Isonychus setifer Moser, 1918

Species of beetle

Isonychus setifer is a species of beetle of the family Scarabaeidae. It is found in Bolivia.

== Description ==
Adults reach a length of about 12–14 mm. They are reddish-brown, grey-haired, the head and legs black with a bronze sheen. The antennae are reddish-yellow with a blackish-brown club. The pronotum is quite densely covered with hairs, with erect hairs interspersed. The lateral margins of the pronotum are covered with long setae. The elytra have very distinct longitudinal striations, the alternating intervals with long erect setae originating from small bare patches. The underside is densely covered with greyish pubescence throughout.
