= Trioserica vuquang =

Scientific classification
- Kingdom: Animalia
- Phylum: Arthropoda
- Class: Insecta
- Order: Coleoptera
- Suborder: Polyphaga
- Infraorder: Scarabaeiformia
- Family: Scarabaeidae
- Genus: Trioserica
- Species: T. vuquang

Binomial name
- Trioserica vuquang Ahrens, Lukic & Pham, 2024

Species of beetle

Trioserica vuquang is a species of beetle of the family Scarabaeidae. It is found in Vietnam.

== Description ==
Adults reach a length of about 5.4–6.1 mm. They have a yellowish brown, oval body, with indistinct, small dark spots on the pronotum, scutellum, and elytra. The antennae are yellow. The dorsal surface is dull, partly with an iridescent green shine, and the surface is almost glabrous.

== Etymology ==
The species is named after its type locality, Vu Quang N.P.
