= Trioserica tadfaek =

Scientific classification
- Kingdom: Animalia
- Phylum: Arthropoda
- Class: Insecta
- Order: Coleoptera
- Suborder: Polyphaga
- Infraorder: Scarabaeiformia
- Family: Scarabaeidae
- Genus: Trioserica
- Species: T. tadfaek

Binomial name
- Trioserica tadfaek Ahrens, Lukic & Pham, 2024

Species of beetle

Trioserica tadfaek is a species of beetle of the family Scarabaeidae. It is found in Laos.

== Description ==
Adults reach a length of about 5.2–5.7 mm. They have a reddish brown, oblong body. The frons and pronotum are dark brown and the elytra have more or less extended, dark spots. The antennae are yellow. The dorsal surface is dull and partly iridescent. The surface is almost glabrous.

== Etymology ==
The species is named after its type locality, Tad Faek.
