= Isonychus podicalis =

Scientific classification
- Kingdom: Animalia
- Phylum: Arthropoda
- Clade: Pancrustacea
- Class: Insecta
- Order: Coleoptera
- Suborder: Polyphaga
- Infraorder: Scarabaeiformia
- Family: Scarabaeidae
- Genus: Isonychus
- Species: I. podicalis

Binomial name
- Isonychus podicalis Moser, 1918

Species of beetle

Isonychus podicalis is a species of beetle of the family Scarabaeidae. It is found in Colombia.

== Description ==
Adults reach a length of about 11–12 mm. They are black and shiny, with the pygidium and the last two abdominal segments reddish-yellow. The frons is moderately densely punctate (the punctures with hairs) and the antennae are black. The pronotum and scutellum are densely covered with hairy punctures. The elytra are striated and covered with grey hairs, but there is a more or less distinct oblique transverse band behind the base, a short common median band, and an apical band, all marked by less dense hairs. The underside is quite densely covered with grey hairs.
