= Trioserica phataem =

Scientific classification
- Kingdom: Animalia
- Phylum: Arthropoda
- Class: Insecta
- Order: Coleoptera
- Suborder: Polyphaga
- Infraorder: Scarabaeiformia
- Family: Scarabaeidae
- Genus: Trioserica
- Species: T. phataem

Binomial name
- Trioserica phataem Ahrens, Lukic & Pham, 2024

Species of beetle

Trioserica phataem is a species of beetle of the family Scarabaeidae. It is found in Thailand and Laos.

== Description ==
Adults reach a length of about 6.7–7.6 mm. They have a yellowish brown, oblong body, with numerous small dark spots. The frons and humeri are dark brown and the antennae are yellow. The dorsal surface is dull and the surface is almost glabrous.

== Etymology ==
The species is named after its type locality, Pha Taem national park.
