= Isonychus ursus =

Scientific classification
- Kingdom: Animalia
- Phylum: Arthropoda
- Clade: Pancrustacea
- Class: Insecta
- Order: Coleoptera
- Suborder: Polyphaga
- Infraorder: Scarabaeiformia
- Family: Scarabaeidae
- Genus: Isonychus
- Species: I. ursus

Binomial name
- Isonychus ursus Moser, 1918

Species of beetle

Isonychus ursus is a species of beetle of the family Scarabaeidae. It is found in Colombia.

== Description ==
Adults reach a length of about 14 mm. They are reddish-brown, but the coloration on the upper surface is completely obscured by the pubescence. The head is punctate, the punctures covered with yellow hairs. The antennae are reddish-yellow. The pronotum is very densely covered with yellow hairs, with some long and erect. The densest, rather long, inclined pubescence on the elytra is yellow, except for a common longitudinal spot next to the suture, which is blackish-brown. Long, erect yellow hairs are found particularly in the basal part of the elytra. The legs are reddish-brown.
