= Trioserica lilongensis =

Scientific classification
- Kingdom: Animalia
- Phylum: Arthropoda
- Class: Insecta
- Order: Coleoptera
- Suborder: Polyphaga
- Infraorder: Scarabaeiformia
- Family: Scarabaeidae
- Genus: Trioserica
- Species: T. lilongensis

Binomial name
- Trioserica lilongensis Ahrens, Liu & Fabrizi, 2021

Species of beetle

Trioserica lilongensis is a species of beetle of the family Scarabaeidae. It is found in China (Fujian, Guangdong, Hongkong).

== Description ==
Adults reach a length of about 6.6–7.4 mm. They have a yellowish brown, oblong body, with yellow antennae. The dorsal surface has small or larger dark spots and is moderately dull and almost glabrous.

== Etymology ==
The species is named after its type locality, Lilong.
