= Isonychus variipennis =

Scientific classification
- Kingdom: Animalia
- Phylum: Arthropoda
- Clade: Pancrustacea
- Class: Insecta
- Order: Coleoptera
- Suborder: Polyphaga
- Infraorder: Scarabaeiformia
- Family: Scarabaeidae
- Genus: Isonychus
- Species: I. variipennis

Binomial name
- Isonychus variipennis Moser, 1918

Species of beetle

Isonychus variipennis is a species of beetle of the family Scarabaeidae. It is found in Bolivia.

== Description ==
Adults reach a length of about 9–10 mm. They are brown with grey hairs and with an elongate body. The head is punctate and the antennae are yellowish-brown. The pronotum is densely punctate, the punctures covered with hairs, with a few interspersed erect hairs. The elytra are striate, the intervals being alternately narrow and the broad. In addition to the grey pubescence, the elytra also have short erect hairs and irregularly placed dark and light spots. The light spots (which are sometimes absent) consist of stronger bristle-like hairs.
