= Trioserica pongpitaki =

Scientific classification
- Kingdom: Animalia
- Phylum: Arthropoda
- Class: Insecta
- Order: Coleoptera
- Suborder: Polyphaga
- Infraorder: Scarabaeiformia
- Family: Scarabaeidae
- Genus: Trioserica
- Species: T. pongpitaki

Binomial name
- Trioserica pongpitaki Ahrens, Lukic & Pham, 2024

Species of beetle

Trioserica pongpitaki is a species of beetle of the family Scarabaeidae. It is found in Thailand.

== Description ==
Adults reach a length of about 6–7.5 mm. They have a reddish brown, oblong body. The frons and pronotum are dark brown and the elytra have more or less extended, dark spots. The antennae are yellow. The dorsal surface is dull and the surface is almost glabrous.

== Etymology ==
The species is named after one of its collectors, Mr. Pongpitak.
