= Trioserica chaudoc =

Scientific classification
- Kingdom: Animalia
- Phylum: Arthropoda
- Class: Insecta
- Order: Coleoptera
- Suborder: Polyphaga
- Infraorder: Scarabaeiformia
- Family: Scarabaeidae
- Genus: Trioserica
- Species: T. chaudoc

Binomial name
- Trioserica chaudoc Ahrens, Lukic & Pham, 2024

Species of beetle

Trioserica chaudoc is a species of beetle of the family Scarabaeidae. It is found in Vietnam.

== Description ==
Adults reach a length of about 5.5 mm. They have a dark red brown, short oval body. The labroclypeus, margins of the pronotum and some spots on the elytra are a little lighter and the antennae are yellow. The dorsal surface is dull and the surface is almost glabrous.

== Etymology ==
The species is named after its type locality, Chaudoc.
