= Periserica gilimalensis =

Scientific classification
- Kingdom: Animalia
- Phylum: Arthropoda
- Class: Insecta
- Order: Coleoptera
- Suborder: Polyphaga
- Infraorder: Scarabaeiformia
- Family: Scarabaeidae
- Genus: Periserica
- Species: P. gilimalensis

Binomial name
- Periserica gilimalensis Fabrizi & Ahrens, 2014

Species of beetle

Periserica gilimalensis is a species of beetle of the family Scarabaeidae. It is found in Sri Lanka.

== Description ==
Adults reach a length of about 7.2–7.3 mm. They have a black, oval body, while the legs are reddish, the antennae are dark brown with a blackish antennal club, the abdomen is dark brown and the head, pronotum and scutellum have a metallic shine. The dorsal surface is shiny and sparsely setose.

== Etymology ==
The species is named after its type location, Gilimale.
