= Trioserica preahkhan =

Scientific classification
- Kingdom: Animalia
- Phylum: Arthropoda
- Class: Insecta
- Order: Coleoptera
- Suborder: Polyphaga
- Infraorder: Scarabaeiformia
- Family: Scarabaeidae
- Genus: Trioserica
- Species: T. preahkhan

Binomial name
- Trioserica preahkhan Ahrens, Lukic & Pham, 2024

Species of beetle

Trioserica preahkhan is a species of beetle of the family Scarabaeidae. It is found in Cambodia.

== Description ==
Adults reach a length of about 6 mm. They have a dark brown, oblong body. The legs, ventral surface, labroclypeus, spots on the head and pronotum, as well as the elytral striae are red brown and the antennae are yellow. The dorsal surface is dull and the surface is almost glabrous.

== Etymology ==
The species is named after its type locality, the Preah Khan Temple.
