= Isonychus penai =

Scientific classification
- Kingdom: Animalia
- Phylum: Arthropoda
- Class: Insecta
- Order: Coleoptera
- Suborder: Polyphaga
- Infraorder: Scarabaeiformia
- Family: Scarabaeidae
- Genus: Isonychus
- Species: I. penai

Binomial name
- Isonychus penai Frey, 1966

Species of beetle

Isonychus penai is a species of beetle of the family Scarabaeidae. It is found in Ecuador.

== Description ==
Adults reach a length of about 4.5–5.5 mm. Males are black and shiny and the pronotum has erect dark, silvery shiny hairs, while the elytra are covered with appressed silvery, dark, and fairly long hairs. The pygidium, underside and legs all have appressed light grey hairs. The antennae of both the males and females are black, and the legs are dark brown. In females, the head and pronotum are black, the elytra brown and the pronotum is covered with erect, appressed, longer hairs.
