= Periserica subsignata =

Scientific classification
- Kingdom: Animalia
- Phylum: Arthropoda
- Class: Insecta
- Order: Coleoptera
- Suborder: Polyphaga
- Infraorder: Scarabaeiformia
- Family: Scarabaeidae
- Genus: Periserica
- Species: P. subsignata

Binomial name
- Periserica subsignata (Walker, 1859)

Synonyms
- Sericesthis subsignata Walker, 1859; Isonychus ventralis Walker, 1859

Species of beetle

Periserica subsignata is a species of beetle of the family Scarabaeidae. It is found in Sri Lanka.

== Description ==
Adults reach a length of about 7.2–7.9 mm. They have a black, oval body, with a brownish abdomen and black antennae. The elytra are reddish brown with black sutural and lateral margins and an indistinct transversal dark spot at the middle. The dorsal surface is moderately shiny and nearly glabrous.
