= Neoserica longiclava =

Scientific classification
- Kingdom: Animalia
- Phylum: Arthropoda
- Clade: Pancrustacea
- Class: Insecta
- Order: Coleoptera
- Suborder: Polyphaga
- Infraorder: Scarabaeiformia
- Family: Scarabaeidae
- Genus: Neoserica
- Species: N. longiclava

Binomial name
- Neoserica longiclava Moser, 1916

Species of beetle

Neoserica longiclava is a species of beetle of the family Scarabaeidae. It is found in the Philippines (Luzon).

== Description ==
Adults reach a length of about 5 mm. They are dull, reddish-brown above and brown below. The frons is tomentose and shows only faint punctation and the antennae are yellowish-brown. The pronotum is fairly densely punctate, with setate lateral margins. The elytra are very slightly furrowed and, due to the dense tomentose covering, the punctures are only visible on the very fine and short setae. Some punctures have slightly longer setae.
