= Periserica zamboangensis =

Scientific classification
- Kingdom: Animalia
- Phylum: Arthropoda
- Clade: Pancrustacea
- Class: Insecta
- Order: Coleoptera
- Suborder: Polyphaga
- Infraorder: Scarabaeiformia
- Family: Scarabaeidae
- Genus: Periserica
- Species: P. zamboangensis

Binomial name
- Periserica zamboangensis Moser, 1917

Species of beetle

Periserica zamboangensis is a species of beetle of the family Scarabaeidae. It is found in the Philippines (Mindanao).

== Description ==
Adults reach a length of about 6 mm. They are yellowish-brown and dull. The head is weakly punctate, with a few setae beside the eyes and on the clypeus. The frons is greenish-spotted. The antennae are yellowish-brown. The pronotum is moderately densely covered with minutely bristled punctures. The elytra have indistinct rows of punctures, with the intervals darker brown spotted, slightly convex, and rather sparsely punctured. The punctures are minutely covered with pale setae. The alternating intervals show some larger white setae.
