= Isonychus chacoensis =

Scientific classification
- Kingdom: Animalia
- Phylum: Arthropoda
- Clade: Pancrustacea
- Class: Insecta
- Order: Coleoptera
- Suborder: Polyphaga
- Infraorder: Scarabaeiformia
- Family: Scarabaeidae
- Genus: Isonychus
- Species: I. chacoensis

Binomial name
- Isonychus chacoensis Moser, 1918

Species of beetle

Isonychus chacoensis is a species of beetle of the family Scarabaeidae. It is found in Bolivia and Ecuador.

== Description ==
Adults reach a length of about 4–5 mm. They are black, while the legs and usually also the elytra are reddish-brown. The head is punctate and the antennae are blackish-brown. The pronotum is rather densely and strongly punctate, the punctures with yellowish hairs. The elytra are rather sparsely covered with yellowish hairs. The underside is covered everywhere, but not densely, with grey hairs.
