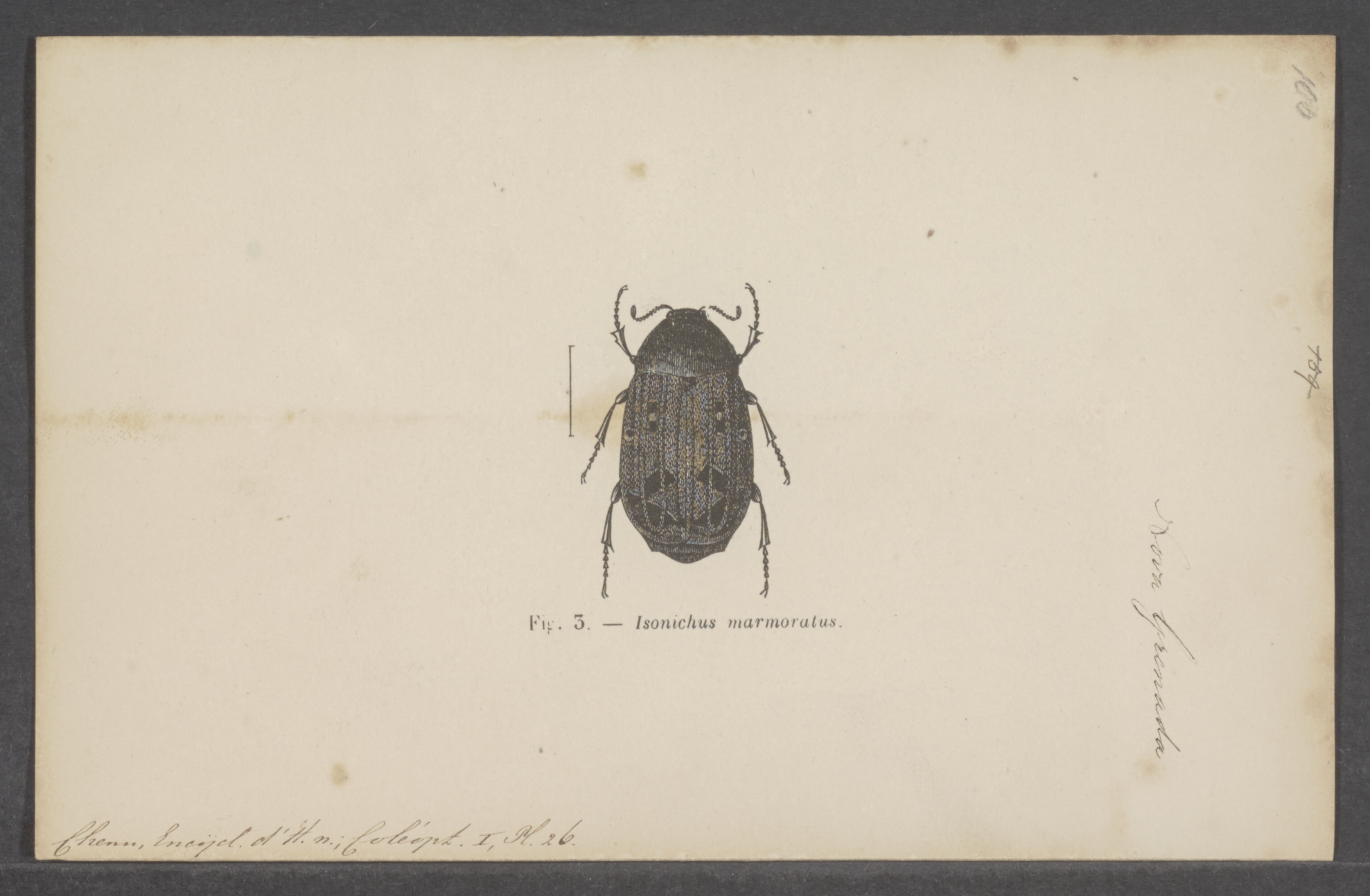
- Isonychus marmoratus

Scientific classification
- Kingdom: Animalia
- Phylum: Arthropoda
- Class: Insecta
- Order: Coleoptera
- Suborder: Polyphaga
- Infraorder: Scarabaeiformia
- Family: Scarabaeidae
- Tribe: Macrodactylini
- Genus: Isonychus; Mannerheim, 1829

Diversity
- ≥140 species

Synonyms
- Colporhina Curtis, 1844

= Isonychus =

Genus of beetles

Isonychus is a genus of May beetles and junebugs in the family Scarabaeidae. There are more than 140 described species in Isonychus.

== See also ==
- List of Isonychus species
