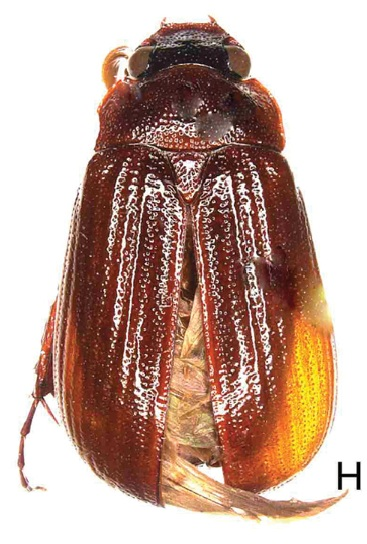

Scientific classification
- Kingdom: Animalia
- Phylum: Arthropoda
- Class: Insecta
- Order: Coleoptera
- Suborder: Polyphaga
- Infraorder: Scarabaeiformia
- Family: Scarabaeidae
- Genus: Nipponoserica
- Species: N. sericanioides

Binomial name
- Nipponoserica sericanioides Ahrens, Fabrizi & Liu, 2017

= Nipponoserica sericanioides =

Species of beetle

Nipponoserica sericanioides is a species of beetle of the family Scarabaeidae. It is found in China (Zhejiang).

== Description ==
Adults reach a length of about 9.5–10 mm. They have an oblong body. The body (including legs) is reddish brown, while the frons is dark brown and the antennae are yellowish brown. The dorsal surface is shiny and glabrous.

== Etymology ==
The species name is derived from the genus name Sericania and Greek oides (meaning similar).
