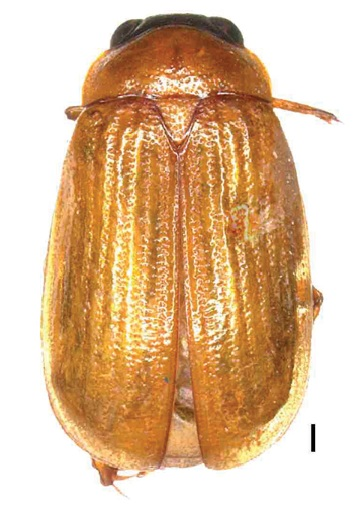

Scientific classification
- Kingdom: Animalia
- Phylum: Arthropoda
- Class: Insecta
- Order: Coleoptera
- Suborder: Polyphaga
- Infraorder: Scarabaeiformia
- Family: Scarabaeidae
- Genus: Nipponoserica
- Species: N. alloshanghaiensis

Binomial name
- Nipponoserica alloshanghaiensis Ahrens, Fabrizi & Liu, 2017

= Nipponoserica alloshanghaiensis =

Species of beetle

Nipponoserica alloshanghaiensis is a species of beetle of the family Scarabaeidae. It is found in China (Jiangxi).

== Description ==
Adults reach a length of about 7.8–8.8 mm. They have a yellow, oblong body, with the frons darker brown and the antennae yellowish brown. The dorsal surface is moderately shiny and glabrous.

== Etymology ==
The species name is derived from Greek allo (meaning other than) and the species name shanghaiensis and refers to the very similar Nipponoserica shanghaiensis.
