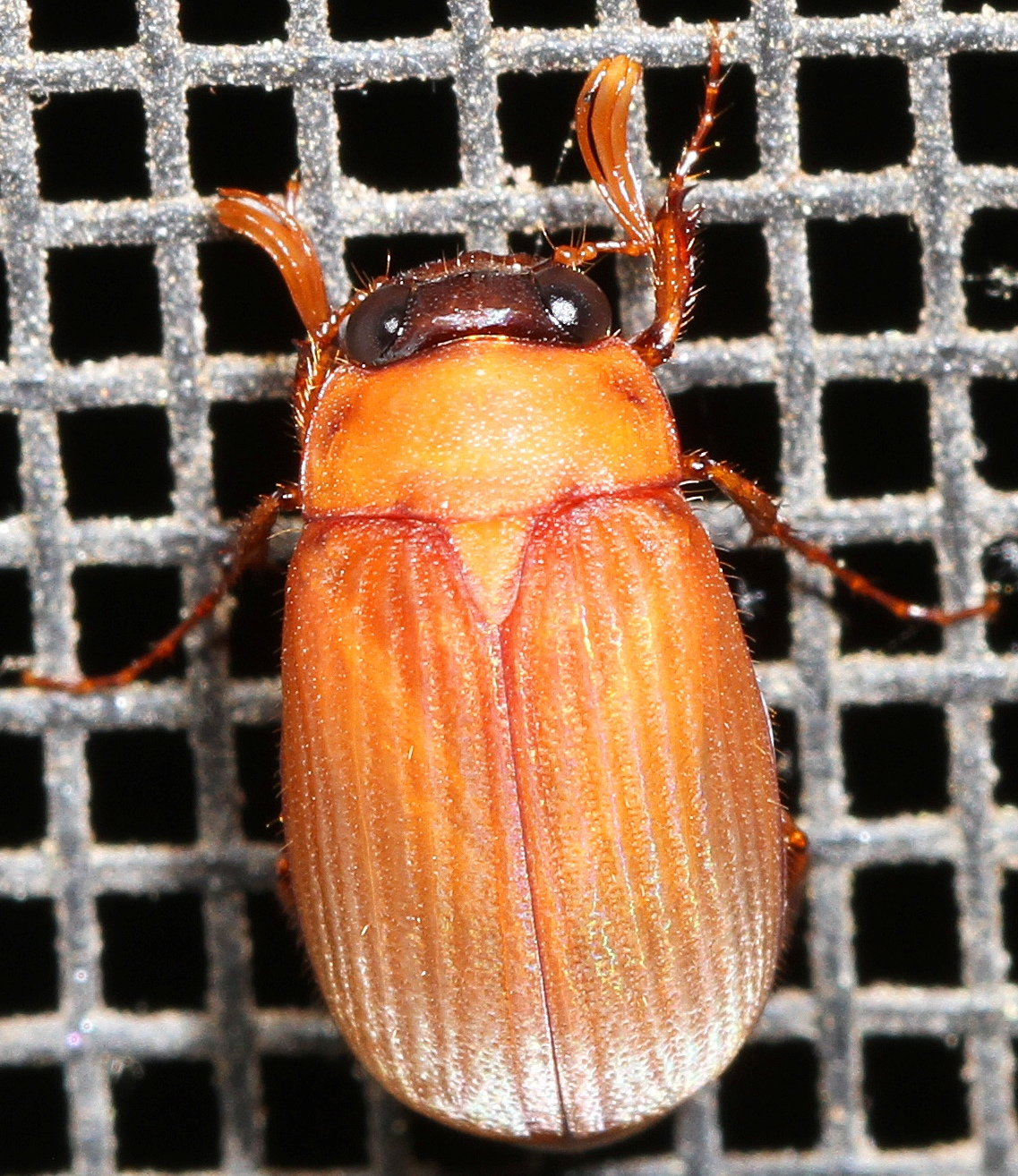
- Nipponoserica peregrina

Scientific classification
- Kingdom: Animalia
- Phylum: Arthropoda
- Class: Insecta
- Order: Coleoptera
- Suborder: Polyphaga
- Infraorder: Scarabaeiformia
- Family: Scarabaeidae
- Tribe: Sericini
- Genus: Nipponoserica; Nomura, 1973

Synonyms
- Pseudomaladera Nikolajev, 1980

= Nipponoserica =

Genus of beetles

Nipponoserica is a genus of May beetles and junebugs in the family Scarabaeidae. There are more than 20 described species in Nipponoserica.

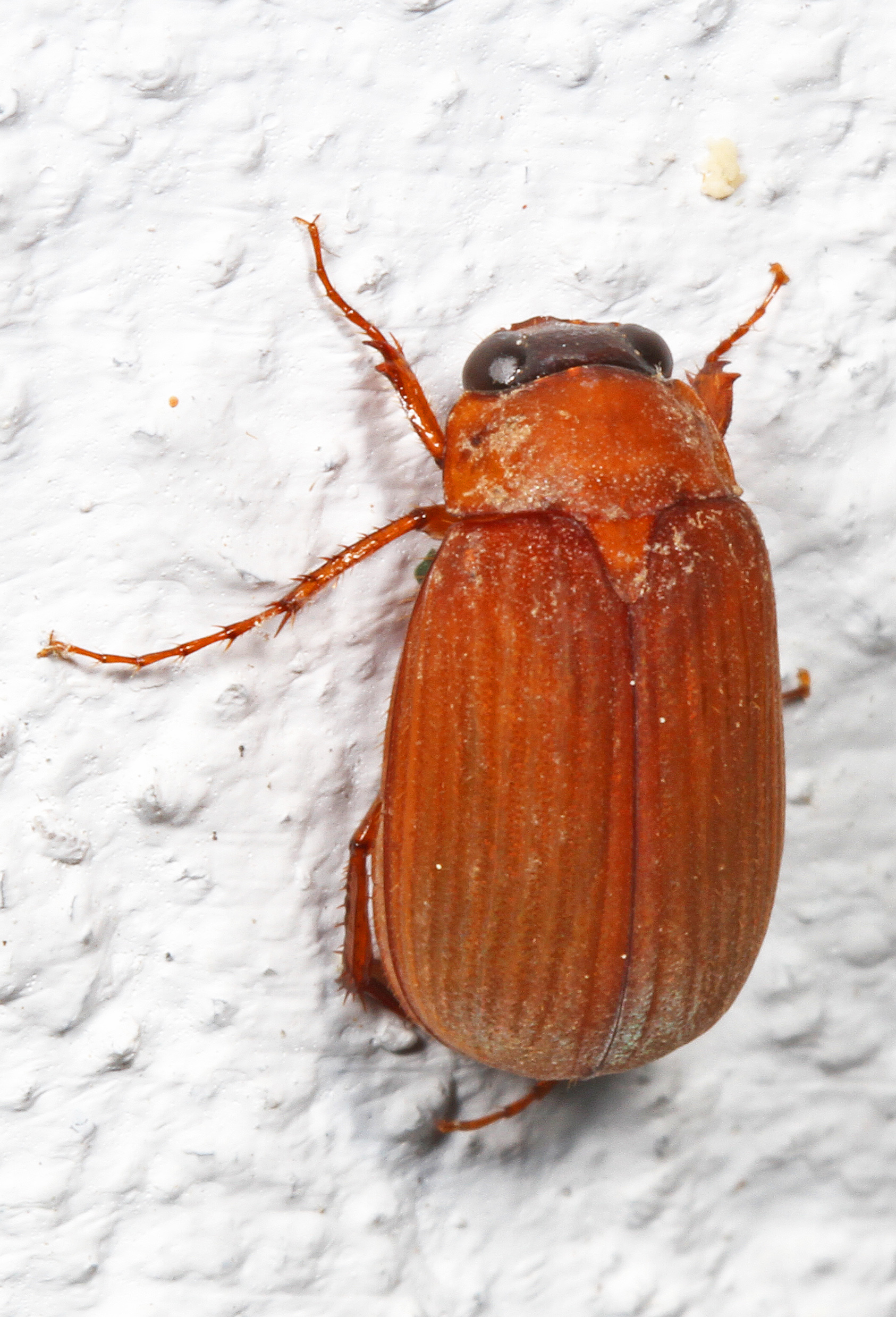
Nipponoserica peregrina

== Species ==
These species belong to the genus Nipponoserica:

- Nipponoserica alloshanghaiensis Ahrens, Fabrizi & Liu, 2017
- Nipponoserica anjiensis Ahrens, Fabrizi & Liu, 2017
- Nipponoserica babai Kobayashi, 1991
- Nipponoserica chinensis (Moser, 1915)
- Nipponoserica dahongshanica Ahrens, 2005
- Nipponoserica daisensis (Sawada, 1937)
- Nipponoserica daqiao Ahrens, Fabrizi & Liu, 2022
- Nipponoserica elliptica (Murayama, 1938)
- Nipponoserica gomadana Nomura, 1976
- Nipponoserica henanensis Ahrens, Fabrizi & Liu, 2017
- Nipponoserica jiankouensis Ahrens, Fabrizi & Liu, 2017
- Nipponoserica koltzei (Reitter, 1897)
- Nipponoserica kunitachiana Nomura, 1976
- Nipponoserica laferi (Nikolajev, 1980)
- Nipponoserica peregrina (Chapin, 1938)
- Nipponoserica pubiventris Nomura, 1976
- Nipponoserica sericanioides Ahrens, Fabrizi & Liu, 2017
- Nipponoserica shanghaiensis Ahrens, 2004
- Nipponoserica similis (Lewis, 1895)
- Nipponoserica sulciventris Ahrens, 2004
- Nipponoserica takeuchii Hirasawa, 1991

== Selected former species ==
- Nipponoserica pindarensis Ahrens, 2000
