= Xenoserica somathangana =

Scientific classification
- Kingdom: Animalia
- Phylum: Arthropoda
- Class: Insecta
- Order: Coleoptera
- Suborder: Polyphaga
- Infraorder: Scarabaeiformia
- Family: Scarabaeidae
- Genus: Xenoserica
- Species: X. somathangana

Binomial name
- Xenoserica somathangana (Ahrens, 1999)

Synonyms
- Serica somathangana Ahrens, 1999

Species of beetle

Xenoserica somathangana is a species of beetle of the family Scarabaeidae. It is found in Nepal.

== Description ==
Adults reach a length of about 9.5–11.1 mm. They have a chestnut brown, elongate body. The upper surface is mostly dull and there are long hairs on the head and pronotum.
