= Xenoserica erectosetosa =

Scientific classification
- Kingdom: Animalia
- Phylum: Arthropoda
- Class: Insecta
- Order: Coleoptera
- Suborder: Polyphaga
- Infraorder: Scarabaeiformia
- Family: Scarabaeidae
- Genus: Xenoserica
- Species: X. erectosetosa

Binomial name
- Xenoserica erectosetosa (Ahrens, 1999)

Synonyms
- Serica erectosetosa Ahrens, 1999

Species of beetle

Xenoserica erectosetosa is a species of beetle of the family Scarabaeidae. It is found in China (Xizang) and Nepal.

== Description ==
Adults reach a length of about 9.7–10.5 mm. They have a reddish-brown, elongate body. The intervals of the elytra are partly somewhat darker. There are long, erect hairs on the head and pronotum. The upper surface is mostly dull.
