= Nipponoserica sulciventris =

Scientific classification
- Kingdom: Animalia
- Phylum: Arthropoda
- Class: Insecta
- Order: Coleoptera
- Suborder: Polyphaga
- Infraorder: Scarabaeiformia
- Family: Scarabaeidae
- Genus: Nipponoserica
- Species: N. sulciventris

Binomial name
- Nipponoserica sulciventris Ahrens, 2004

Species of beetle

Nipponoserica sulciventris is a species of beetle of the family Scarabaeidae. It is found in China (Gansu, Hubei, Shaanxi, Sichuan).

== Description ==
Adults reach a length of about 8.3–8.4 mm. They have an oblong body. The dorsal surface is shiny, glabrous and yellowish with a blackish frons. The ventral surface is yellowish brown and the antennae are yellow.

== Etymology ==
The species name is derived from Latin sulcus (meaning furrow) and venter (meaning abdomen).
