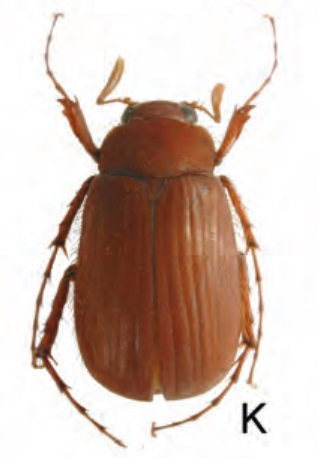

Scientific classification
- Kingdom: Animalia
- Phylum: Arthropoda
- Class: Insecta
- Order: Coleoptera
- Suborder: Polyphaga
- Infraorder: Scarabaeiformia
- Family: Scarabaeidae
- Genus: Xenoserica
- Species: X. sindhensis

Binomial name
- Xenoserica sindhensis (Ahrens, 2000)

Synonyms
- Nipponoserica sindhensis Ahrens, 2000

= Xenoserica sindhensis =

Species of beetle

Xenoserica sindhensis is a species of beetle of the family Scarabaeidae. It is found in Kashmir.

== Description ==
Adults reach a length of about 9.8-10.6 mm. They have a reddish-brown, elongate-oval body. They are mostly dull and the upper side is almost completely glabrous, except for the cilia along the margins of the pronotum and elytra.

== Etymology ==
The species is named after its type locality, the Sindh Valley.
