= Sericania loebli =

Scientific classification
- Kingdom: Animalia
- Phylum: Arthropoda
- Clade: Pancrustacea
- Class: Insecta
- Order: Coleoptera
- Suborder: Polyphaga
- Infraorder: Scarabaeiformia
- Family: Scarabaeidae
- Genus: Sericania
- Species: S. loebli

Binomial name
- Sericania loebli Ahrens, 2004

Species of beetle

Sericania loebli is a species of beetle of the family Scarabaeidae. It is found in the Indus-Himalaya.

== Description ==
Adults reach a length of about 7-8.3 mm. They have a dark brown, elongated-oval body. The dorsal surface is shiny and slightly iridescent, with only a few bristles on the pronotum and elytral margins and numerous short hairs on the elytra.

== Etymology ==
The species is named for Ivan Löbl, who first collected the species.
