= Sericania babaulti =

Scientific classification
- Kingdom: Animalia
- Phylum: Arthropoda
- Clade: Pancrustacea
- Class: Insecta
- Order: Coleoptera
- Suborder: Polyphaga
- Infraorder: Scarabaeiformia
- Family: Scarabaeidae
- Genus: Sericania
- Species: S. babaulti

Binomial name
- Sericania babaulti Ahrens, 2004

Species of beetle

Sericania babaulti is a species of beetle of the family Scarabaeidae. It is found in the Indus- and Punjab-Himalaya.

== Description ==
Adults reach a length of about 8.3-9.2 mm. They have a reddish-brown, elongated-oval body. The dorsal surface is shiny and almost completely glabrous, with only a few bristles on the pronotum and elytral margins and a few fine, short hairs on the elytra.

== Etymology ==
The species is named for G. Babault, who collected the type specimen.
