= Sericania latisulcata =

Scientific classification
- Kingdom: Animalia
- Phylum: Arthropoda
- Clade: Pancrustacea
- Class: Insecta
- Order: Coleoptera
- Suborder: Polyphaga
- Infraorder: Scarabaeiformia
- Family: Scarabaeidae
- Genus: Sericania
- Species: S. latisulcata

Binomial name
- Sericania latisulcata Murayama, 1941

Species of beetle

Sericania latisulcata is a species of beetle of the family Scarabaeidae. It is found in South Korea.

== Description ==
Adults reach a length of about 9–12 mm. They have a shiny, yellowish brown to brown, elongate oval body, with a dark brown head.
