= Sericania kashmirensis =

Scientific classification
- Kingdom: Animalia
- Phylum: Arthropoda
- Clade: Pancrustacea
- Class: Insecta
- Order: Coleoptera
- Suborder: Polyphaga
- Infraorder: Scarabaeiformia
- Family: Scarabaeidae
- Genus: Sericania
- Species: S. kashmirensis

Binomial name
- Sericania kashmirensis (Moser, 1919)

Synonyms
- Neoserica kashmirensis Moser, 1919

Species of beetle

Sericania kashmirensis is a species of beetle of the family Scarabaeidae. It is found in the Kashmir valley.

== Description ==
Adults reach a length of about 8.5 mm. They have a light to dark reddish-brown, elongated-oval body. The dorsal surface is shiny and almost completely glabrous, with only a few bristles on the pronotum and elytral margins and a few fine, short hairs on the elytra.
