= Sericania opaca =

Scientific classification
- Kingdom: Animalia
- Phylum: Arthropoda
- Class: Insecta
- Order: Coleoptera
- Suborder: Polyphaga
- Infraorder: Scarabaeiformia
- Family: Scarabaeidae
- Genus: Sericania
- Species: S. opaca

Binomial name
- Sericania opaca Nomura, 1973

Synonyms
- Sericania quadrifoliata opaca Nomura, 1973; Sericania hiranoi Miyake, 1988

Species of beetle

Sericania opaca is a species of beetle of the family Scarabaeidae. It is found in Japan.

== Description ==
Adults reach a length of about 10.5–11.5 mm.
