= Nipponoserica koltzei =

Scientific classification
- Kingdom: Animalia
- Phylum: Arthropoda
- Class: Insecta
- Order: Coleoptera
- Suborder: Polyphaga
- Infraorder: Scarabaeiformia
- Family: Scarabaeidae
- Genus: Nipponoserica
- Species: N. koltzei

Binomial name
- Nipponoserica koltzei (Reitter, 1897)

Synonyms
- Serica koltzei Reitter, 1897; Nipponoserica opacicarina Kim & Kim, 2003

Species of beetle

Nipponoserica koltzei is a species of beetle of the family Scarabaeidae. It is found in China (Gansu, Heilongjiang, Henan, Shaanxi, Xizang), South Korea and the Russian Far East.

== Description ==
Adults reach a length of about 6.5–8.5 mm. They have a yellowish brown to dark brown, cylindrical, velvety body. The antennae are yellow.
