= Sericania carinata =

Scientific classification
- Kingdom: Animalia
- Phylum: Arthropoda
- Clade: Pancrustacea
- Class: Insecta
- Order: Coleoptera
- Suborder: Polyphaga
- Infraorder: Scarabaeiformia
- Family: Scarabaeidae
- Genus: Sericania
- Species: S. carinata

Binomial name
- Sericania carinata Brenske, 1899

Species of beetle

Sericania carinata is a species of beetle of the family Scarabaeidae. It is found in China (Hong Kong).

== Description ==
Adults reach a length of about 6.5–7 mm. They have a slightly metallic brown sheen. The clypeus is curved anteriorly, the corners rounded, the sides curved and the surface is densely punctate. The frons and vertex are finely punctate. The pronotum is densely punctate, slightly projecting in the middle of the anterior margin, the anterior angles pointed, the posterior angles rectangular, the lateral margin slightly curved in front of them, with an impression in front of the scutellum. The elytra are strongly striate, the intervals with smooth ribs, densely and irregularly punctate within the striations. The pygidium is densely punctate, with prominent abdominal setae.
