= Sericania swatensis =

Scientific classification
- Kingdom: Animalia
- Phylum: Arthropoda
- Clade: Pancrustacea
- Class: Insecta
- Order: Coleoptera
- Suborder: Polyphaga
- Infraorder: Scarabaeiformia
- Family: Scarabaeidae
- Genus: Sericania
- Species: S. swatensis

Binomial name
- Sericania swatensis Ahrens, 2004

Species of beetle

Sericania swatensis is a species of beetle of the family Scarabaeidae. It is found in the Indus-Himalaya.

== Description ==
Adults reach a length of about 7.5-8.6 mm. They have a reddish-brown, dull, elongated-oval body, often with an iridescent sheen dorsally, and almost completely glabrous dorsally, with only a few bristles on the pronotum and elytra and a few fine, short hairs on the elytra.

== Etymology ==
The species name refers to its occurrence in the Swat District.
