= Sericania yamauchii =

Scientific classification
- Kingdom: Animalia
- Phylum: Arthropoda
- Clade: Pancrustacea
- Class: Insecta
- Order: Coleoptera
- Suborder: Polyphaga
- Infraorder: Scarabaeiformia
- Family: Scarabaeidae
- Genus: Sericania
- Species: S. yamauchii

Binomial name
- Sericania yamauchii Sawada, 1938

Synonyms
- Serica ussuriensis Medvedev, 1952; Sericania hasegawai Murayama, 1941

Species of beetle

Sericania yamauchii is a species of beetle of the family Scarabaeidae. It is found in Japan, South Korea, the Russian Far East and China (Heilongjiang, Liaoning).

== Description ==
Adults reach a length of about 9.5–12 mm. They have a dark brown, long body. The dorsal surface of the males has a weak pearly luster, while the females are completely shiny on the dorsal and ventral surfaces.

== Subspecies ==
- Sericania yamauchii yamauchii (Japan, South Korea, Russian Far East, China: Heilongjiang, Liaoning)
- Sericania yamauchii mochizukii Kobayashi, 2014 (Japan)
