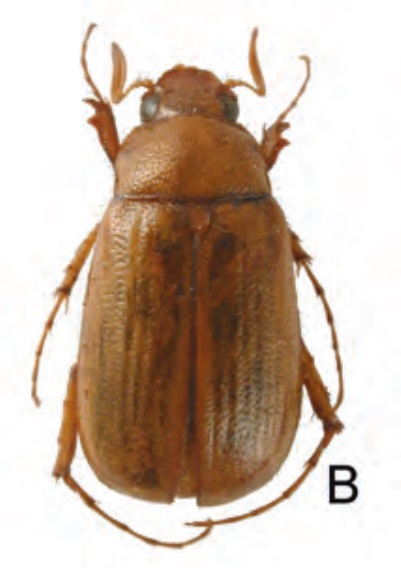

Scientific classification
- Kingdom: Animalia
- Phylum: Arthropoda
- Clade: Pancrustacea
- Class: Insecta
- Order: Coleoptera
- Suborder: Polyphaga
- Infraorder: Scarabaeiformia
- Family: Scarabaeidae
- Genus: Sericania
- Species: S. mela

Binomial name
- Sericania mela Ahrens, 2004

= Sericania mela =

Species of beetle

Sericania mela is a species of beetle of the family Scarabaeidae. It is found in western and central Nepal.

== Description ==
Adults reach a length of about 5.4-7.3 mm. They have a yellow-brown slender, elongate-oval body. Both the ventral and dorsal surfaces are shiny, almost completely glabrous dorsally, with only the head, pronotum, and elytral margins with some hairs.

== Etymology ==
The species name is derived from the Nepali word mela (meaning festival).
