= Xenoserica kataevi =

Scientific classification
- Kingdom: Animalia
- Phylum: Arthropoda
- Class: Insecta
- Order: Coleoptera
- Suborder: Polyphaga
- Infraorder: Scarabaeiformia
- Family: Scarabaeidae
- Genus: Xenoserica
- Species: X. kataevi

Binomial name
- Xenoserica kataevi Ahrens, 2021

Species of beetle

Xenoserica kataevi is a species of beetle of the family Scarabaeidae. It is found in Nepal.

== Description ==
Adults reach a length of about 11.5 mm. They have a dark reddish brown, oblong body. The elytral striae and some smaller spots on the pronotum are reddish and the antennae are yellow. The dorsal surface is dull, with a few long setae on the anterior pronotum and elytra.

== Etymology ==
The species is dedicated to its collector Boris M. Kataev.
