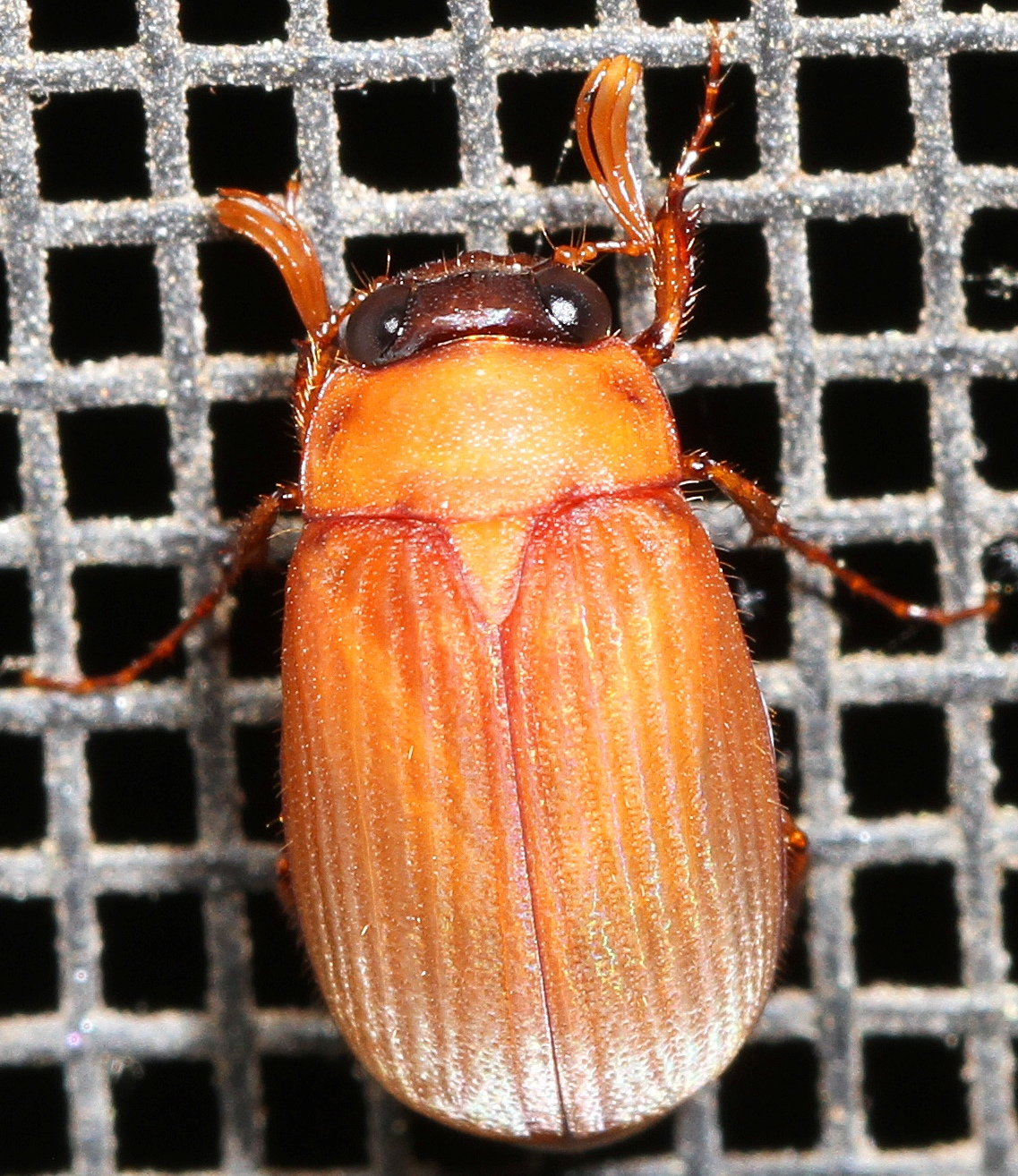

Scientific classification
- Kingdom: Animalia
- Phylum: Arthropoda
- Class: Insecta
- Order: Coleoptera
- Suborder: Polyphaga
- Infraorder: Scarabaeiformia
- Family: Scarabaeidae
- Genus: Nipponoserica
- Species: N. peregrina

Binomial name
- Nipponoserica peregrina (Chapin, 1938)

Synonyms
- Serica peregrina Chapin, 1938

= Nipponoserica peregrina =

Species of beetle

Nipponoserica peregrina is a species of scarab beetle in the family Scarabaeidae. It is found in North America (Maryland, Massachusetts, New York, Virginia, West Virginia) and Japan.

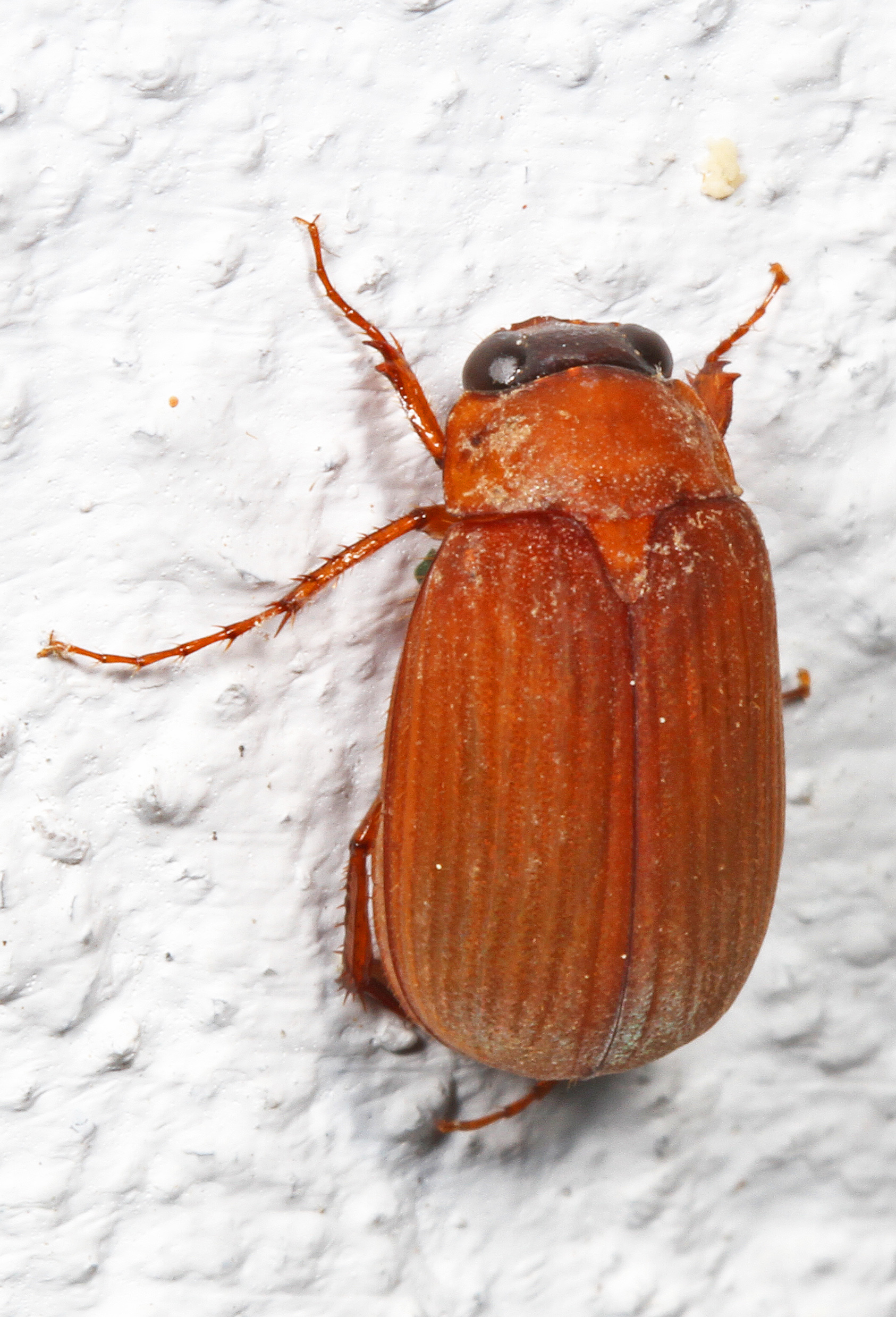
