= Xenoserica selaensis =

Scientific classification
- Kingdom: Animalia
- Phylum: Arthropoda
- Class: Insecta
- Order: Coleoptera
- Suborder: Polyphaga
- Infraorder: Scarabaeiformia
- Family: Scarabaeidae
- Genus: Xenoserica
- Species: X. selaensis

Binomial name
- Xenoserica selaensis Ahrens & Fabrizi, 2009

Species of beetle

Xenoserica selaensis is a species of beetle of the family Scarabaeidae. It is found in India (Arunachal Pradesh).

== Description ==
Adults reach a length of about 11.2 mm. They have a dark brown, oblong body. The antennae are yellowish brown and the legs are reddish brown. The dorsal surface is mostly dull and the head is sparsely setose. The dorsal surface of the pronotum and elytra is nearly glabrous.

== Etymology ==
The species name is derived from its type locality, the Sela Pass.
