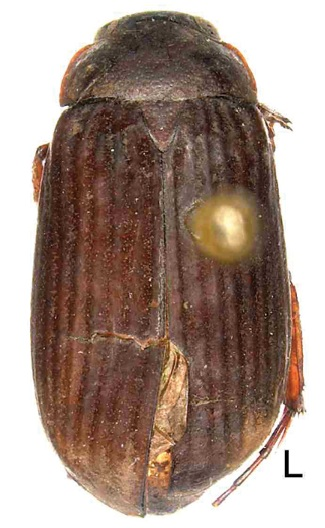

Scientific classification
- Kingdom: Animalia
- Phylum: Arthropoda
- Clade: Pancrustacea
- Class: Insecta
- Order: Coleoptera
- Suborder: Polyphaga
- Infraorder: Scarabaeiformia
- Family: Scarabaeidae
- Genus: Nipponoserica
- Species: N. elliptica

Binomial name
- Nipponoserica elliptica (Murayama, 1938)

Synonyms
- Serica elliptica Murayama, 1938

= Nipponoserica elliptica =

Species of beetle

Nipponoserica elliptica is a species of beetle of the family Scarabaeidae. It is found in China (Jiangxi) and South Korea.

== Description ==
Adults reach a length of about 9.6 mm. They have an oblong body. The body (including legs) is dark brown and the antennae are yellowish brown. The dorsal surface is dull and glabrous.
