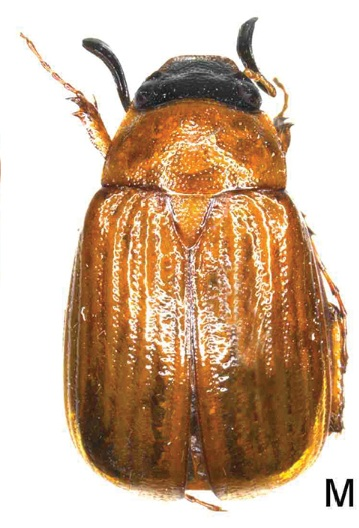

Scientific classification
- Kingdom: Animalia
- Phylum: Arthropoda
- Class: Insecta
- Order: Coleoptera
- Suborder: Polyphaga
- Infraorder: Scarabaeiformia
- Family: Scarabaeidae
- Genus: Nipponoserica
- Species: N. henanensis

Binomial name
- Nipponoserica henanensis Ahrens, Fabrizi & Liu, 2017

= Nipponoserica henanensis =

Species of beetle

Nipponoserica henanensis is a species of beetle of the family Scarabaeidae. It is found in China (Henan).

== Description ==
Adults reach a length of about 7.7–8.2 mm. They have a yellow, oblong body, with a blackish frons. The labroclypeus and ventral surface are dark brown and the antennae are yellowish brown. The dorsal surface is shiny and glabrous.

== Etymology ==
The species name refers to its occurrence in the Henan province.
