= Xenoserica koshiana =

Scientific classification
- Kingdom: Animalia
- Phylum: Arthropoda
- Class: Insecta
- Order: Coleoptera
- Suborder: Polyphaga
- Infraorder: Scarabaeiformia
- Family: Scarabaeidae
- Genus: Xenoserica
- Species: X. koshiana

Binomial name
- Xenoserica koshiana (Ahrens, 1999)

Synonyms
- Serica koshiana Ahrens, 1999

Species of beetle

Xenoserica koshiana is a species of beetle of the family Scarabaeidae. It is found in Nepal.

== Description ==
Adults reach a length of about 9.5–9.8 mm. They have a reddish-brown, elongate body, with the disc of the elytra somewhat darker. The upper surface is mostly dull and nearly glabrous.
