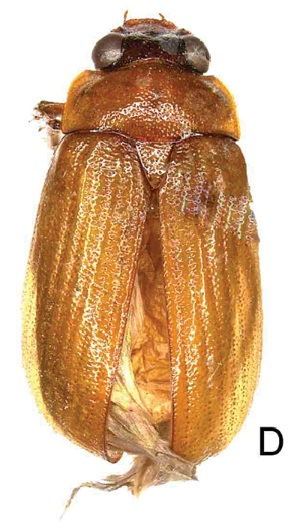

Scientific classification
- Kingdom: Animalia
- Phylum: Arthropoda
- Class: Insecta
- Order: Coleoptera
- Suborder: Polyphaga
- Infraorder: Scarabaeiformia
- Family: Scarabaeidae
- Genus: Nipponoserica
- Species: N. anjiensis

Binomial name
- Nipponoserica anjiensis Ahrens, Fabrizi & Liu, 2017

= Nipponoserica anjiensis =

Species of beetle

Nipponoserica anjiensis is a species of beetle of the family Scarabaeidae. It is found in China (Shaanxi, Zhejiang).

== Description ==
Adults reach a length of about 8–8.5 mm. They have a yellow, oblong body, with the frons darker brown and the antennae yellowish brown. The dorsal surface is entirely shiny and glabrous.

== Etymology ==
The species is named after its type locality, Anji.
