= Sericania quadrifoliata =

Scientific classification
- Kingdom: Animalia
- Phylum: Arthropoda
- Clade: Pancrustacea
- Class: Insecta
- Order: Coleoptera
- Suborder: Polyphaga
- Infraorder: Scarabaeiformia
- Family: Scarabaeidae
- Genus: Sericania
- Species: S. quadrifoliata

Binomial name
- Sericania quadrifoliata (Lewis, 1895)

Synonyms
- Serica quadrifoliata Lewis, 1895; Sericania shinanoensis Niijima & Kinoshita, 1923

Species of beetle

Sericania quadrifoliata is a species of beetle of the family Scarabaeidae. It is found in Japan.

== Description ==
Adults reach a length of about 10.5–11 mm. They have a brownish-black, dull body.
