= Sericania dubiosa =

Scientific classification
- Kingdom: Animalia
- Phylum: Arthropoda
- Clade: Pancrustacea
- Class: Insecta
- Order: Coleoptera
- Suborder: Polyphaga
- Infraorder: Scarabaeiformia
- Family: Scarabaeidae
- Genus: Sericania
- Species: S. dubiosa

Binomial name
- Sericania dubiosa Ahrens, 2004

Species of beetle

Sericania dubiosa is a species of beetle of the family Scarabaeidae. It is found in the Punjab Himalaya.

== Description ==
Adults reach a length of about 6.6 mm. They have a reddish-brown, elongated-oval body. The dorsal surface is shiny (often with an iridescent sheen) and almost completely glabrous, with only a few bristles on the pronotum and elytral margins and some fine, short hairs on the elytra.

== Etymology ==
The species name is derived from Latin dubiosus (meaning doubtful).
