= Nipponoserica similis =

Scientific classification
- Kingdom: Animalia
- Phylum: Arthropoda
- Class: Insecta
- Order: Coleoptera
- Suborder: Polyphaga
- Infraorder: Scarabaeiformia
- Family: Scarabaeidae
- Genus: Nipponoserica
- Species: N. similis

Binomial name
- Nipponoserica similis (Lewis, 1895)

Synonyms
- Serica similis Lewis, 1895; Nipponoserica setiventris Nomura, 1976

Species of beetle

Nipponoserica similis is a species of beetle of the family Scarabaeidae. It is found in Japan and has been introduced to the United States, where it has been recorded from New York.

== Description ==
Adults reach a length of about 8–10 mm. They are deceptively similar to Serica brunnea. They have an oblong-oval, yellowish-red body, with the back of the head a little darker. They are dull without an opalescent sheen.
