= Sericania gilgitensis =

Scientific classification
- Kingdom: Animalia
- Phylum: Arthropoda
- Clade: Pancrustacea
- Class: Insecta
- Order: Coleoptera
- Suborder: Polyphaga
- Infraorder: Scarabaeiformia
- Family: Scarabaeidae
- Genus: Sericania
- Species: S. gilgitensis

Binomial name
- Sericania gilgitensis Ahrens, 2004

Species of beetle

Sericania gilgitensis is a species of beetle of the family Scarabaeidae. It is found in the Indus-Himalaya.

== Description ==
Adults reach a length of about 7.1 mm. They have a black, elongated-oval body. The elytra are dark reddish-brown, and slightly shiny and almost completely glabrous dorsally, with a few cilia on the pronotum and elytral margins and numerous hairs on the forehead.

== Etymology ==
The species is named for its occurrence in the Gilgit region.
