= Sericania koryoensis =

Scientific classification
- Kingdom: Animalia
- Phylum: Arthropoda
- Clade: Pancrustacea
- Class: Insecta
- Order: Coleoptera
- Suborder: Polyphaga
- Infraorder: Scarabaeiformia
- Family: Scarabaeidae
- Genus: Sericania
- Species: S. koryoensis

Binomial name
- Sericania koryoensis Murayama, 1935

Species of beetle

Sericania koryoensis is a species of beetle of the family Scarabaeidae. It is found in South Korea.

== Description ==
Adults reach a length of about 8–10 mm. They have a short body. The dorsal surface is strongly shiny and reddish brown to black.
