= Sericania nepalensis =

Scientific classification
- Kingdom: Animalia
- Phylum: Arthropoda
- Clade: Pancrustacea
- Class: Insecta
- Order: Coleoptera
- Suborder: Polyphaga
- Infraorder: Scarabaeiformia
- Family: Scarabaeidae
- Genus: Sericania
- Species: S. nepalensis

Binomial name
- Sericania nepalensis (Frey, 1965)

Synonyms
- Autoserica nepalensis Frey, 1965

Species of beetle

Sericania nepalensis is a species of beetle of the family Scarabaeidae. It is found in central Nepal.

== Description ==
Adults reach a length of about 5.2-6.7 mm. They have a yellow-brown slender, elongate-oval body. The dorsal surface is shiny and dorsally almost completely glabrous, only the pronotum and elytral margins with a few bristles.
