= Xenoserica brachyptera =

Scientific classification
- Kingdom: Animalia
- Phylum: Arthropoda
- Class: Insecta
- Order: Coleoptera
- Suborder: Polyphaga
- Infraorder: Scarabaeiformia
- Family: Scarabaeidae
- Genus: Xenoserica
- Species: X. brachyptera

Binomial name
- Xenoserica brachyptera Ahrens, 2005

Species of beetle

Xenoserica brachyptera is a species of beetle of the family Scarabaeidae. It is found in Nepal.

== Description ==
Adults reach a length of about 9.5–10.5 mm. They have a dark or reddish brown, oval body. The wings are reduced in length. The antennae are yellowish. The dorsal surface is shiny and glabrous.

== Etymology ==
The species name is derived from Latinized Greek brachys (meaning short) and pteron (meaning wing).
