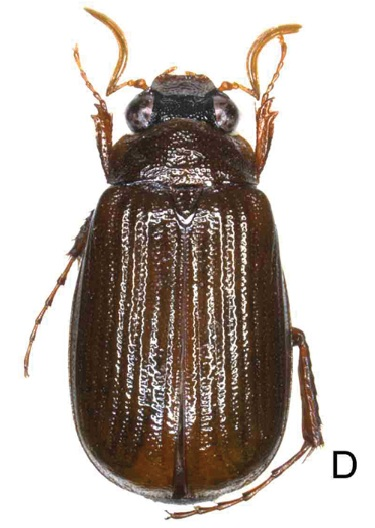

Scientific classification
- Kingdom: Animalia
- Phylum: Arthropoda
- Class: Insecta
- Order: Coleoptera
- Suborder: Polyphaga
- Infraorder: Scarabaeiformia
- Family: Scarabaeidae
- Genus: Nipponoserica
- Species: N. jiankouensis

Binomial name
- Nipponoserica jiankouensis Ahrens, Fabrizi & Liu, 2017

= Nipponoserica jiankouensis =

Species of beetle

Nipponoserica jiankouensis is a species of beetle of the family Scarabaeidae. It is found in China (Guizhou).

== Description ==
Adults reach a length of about 7.8 mm. They have an oblong body. The body (including legs) is dark yellow brown, while the frons and ventral surface are dark brown and the antennae are yellowish brown. The dorsal surface is shiny and glabrous.

== Etymology ==
The species name refers to its occurrence in vicinity of Jiankou.
