= Sericania costulata =

Scientific classification
- Kingdom: Animalia
- Phylum: Arthropoda
- Clade: Pancrustacea
- Class: Insecta
- Order: Coleoptera
- Suborder: Polyphaga
- Infraorder: Scarabaeiformia
- Family: Scarabaeidae
- Genus: Sericania
- Species: S. costulata

Binomial name
- Sericania costulata (Moser, 1915)

Synonyms
- Serica costulata Moser, 1915

Species of beetle

Sericania costulata is a species of beetle of the family Scarabaeidae. It is found from the Indus-Himalaya to western Nepal.

== Description ==
Adults reach a length of about 6.7-7.7 mm. They have a reddish-brown, elongated-oval body. The dorsal surface is shiny and almost completely glabrous, with only a few bristles on the pronotum and elytral margins and a few fine, short hairs on the elytra.
