= Sericania fuscolineata =

Scientific classification
- Kingdom: Animalia
- Phylum: Arthropoda
- Clade: Pancrustacea
- Class: Insecta
- Order: Coleoptera
- Suborder: Polyphaga
- Infraorder: Scarabaeiformia
- Family: Scarabaeidae
- Genus: Sericania
- Species: S. fuscolineata

Binomial name
- Sericania fuscolineata Motschulsky, 1860

Synonyms
- Sericania fulgida Niijima & Kinoshita, 1927; Sericania testacea Sawada, 1938; Sericania fuscolineata nipponensis Nomura, 1976

Species of beetle

Sericania fuscolineata is a species of beetle of the family Scarabaeidae. It is found in Japan, North Korea, the Russian Far East, South Korea and China (Heilongjiang, Liaoning).

== Description ==
Adults reach a length of about 8–11 mm. The body is long and cylindrical, and the dorsal surface is flat. They are yellowish brown to dark brown, metallic shiny and completely covered with setae.

== Subspecies ==
- Sericania fuscolineata fuscolineata (Japan, North Korea, Russian Far East, South Korea, China: Heilongjiang, Liaoning)
- Sericania fuscolineata ezoensis Nomura, 1976 (Japan)
- Sericania fuscolineata fulgida Niijima & Kinoshita, 1927 (Japan)
- Sericania fuscolineata minuscula Nomura, 1976 (Japan)
