= Sericania mimica =

Scientific classification
- Kingdom: Animalia
- Phylum: Arthropoda
- Clade: Pancrustacea
- Class: Insecta
- Order: Coleoptera
- Suborder: Polyphaga
- Infraorder: Scarabaeiformia
- Family: Scarabaeidae
- Genus: Sericania
- Species: S. mimica

Binomial name
- Sericania mimica Lewis, 1895

Synonyms
- Sericania matsuyamana Sawada, 1938; Sericania quinquefoliata Sawada, 1938; Sericania takaoana Sawada, 1938; Sericania kompira Miyake & Sano, 1996

Species of beetle

Sericania mimica is a species of beetle of the family Scarabaeidae. It is found in Taiwan and Japan.

== Description ==
Adults reach a length of about 9–11 mm. They have an elongate, pitchy red, shining body. The head is roughly and densely punctate, with the clypeus reddish brown and the outer edge more or less raised. The head is dark brown between the eyes. The thorax is punctate, with the points larger and less closely set than those of the head. The scutellum punctate, somewhat elongate, obtuse behind and the elytra have eight or nine shallow furrows occupied with confluent punctures, the interspaces feebly convex and smooth. The pygidium is irregularly, not densely punctured.

== Subspecies ==
- Sericania mimica mimica (Japan, Taiwan)
- Sericania mimica kompira Miyake & Sano, 1996 (Japan)
