= Nipponoserica daqiao =

Scientific classification
- Kingdom: Animalia
- Phylum: Arthropoda
- Class: Insecta
- Order: Coleoptera
- Suborder: Polyphaga
- Infraorder: Scarabaeiformia
- Family: Scarabaeidae
- Genus: Nipponoserica
- Species: N. daqiao

Binomial name
- Nipponoserica daqiao Ahrens, Fabrizi & Liu, 2022

Species of beetle

Nipponoserica daqiao is a species of beetle of the family Scarabaeidae. It is found in China (Guangdong).

== Description ==
Adults reach a length of about 7.8 mm. They have an oblong body. The dorsal surface is yellow, while the frons and ventral surface are darker brown, and the legs and antennae are yellowish brown. The dorsal surface is entirely shiny and glabrous.

== Etymology ==
The species is named after the type locality, Daqiao.
