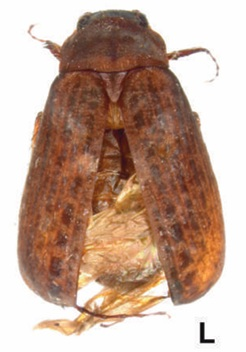

Scientific classification
- Kingdom: Animalia
- Phylum: Arthropoda
- Class: Insecta
- Order: Coleoptera
- Suborder: Polyphaga
- Infraorder: Scarabaeiformia
- Family: Scarabaeidae
- Genus: Xenoserica
- Species: X. yadongensis

Binomial name
- Xenoserica yadongensis (Liu & Ahrens, 2014)

Synonyms
- Serica yadongensis Liu & Ahrens, 2014

= Xenoserica yadongensis =

Species of beetle

Xenoserica yadongensis is a species of beetle of the family Scarabaeidae. It is found in China (Xizang).

== Description ==
Adults reach a length of about 9–10 mm. They have a dark reddish brown, oblong body. The head is dark brown and the antennae are yellowish brown. The dorsal surface is dull, the elytra with irregular dark spots and the head and pronotum with long erect setae. The elytra has minute to short white adpressed setae.

== Etymology ==
The species is named after the type locality, Yadong.
