= Xenoserica =

Scientific classification
- Kingdom: Animalia
- Phylum: Arthropoda
- Clade: Pancrustacea
- Class: Insecta
- Order: Coleoptera
- Suborder: Polyphaga
- Infraorder: Scarabaeiformia
- Family: Scarabaeidae
- Subfamily: Sericinae
- Tribe: Sericini
- Genus: Xenoserica; Ahrens, 2005

Genus of leaf beetles

Xenoserica is a genus of beetles belonging to the family Scarabaeidae.

== Species ==
- Xenoserica brachyptera Ahrens, 2005
- Xenoserica erectosetosa (Ahrens, 1999)
- Xenoserica karnaliensis (Ahrens, 1999)
- Xenoserica kataevi Ahrens, 2021
- Xenoserica koshiana (Ahrens, 1999)
- Xenoserica matthiasi Shrestha, Eberle & Ahrens, 2012
- Xenoserica pindarensis (Ahrens, 2000)
- Xenoserica selaensis Ahrens & Fabrizi, 2009
- Xenoserica sindhensis (Ahrens, 2000)
- Xenoserica somathangana (Ahrens, 1999)
- Xenoserica yadongensis (Liu & Ahrens, 2014)
