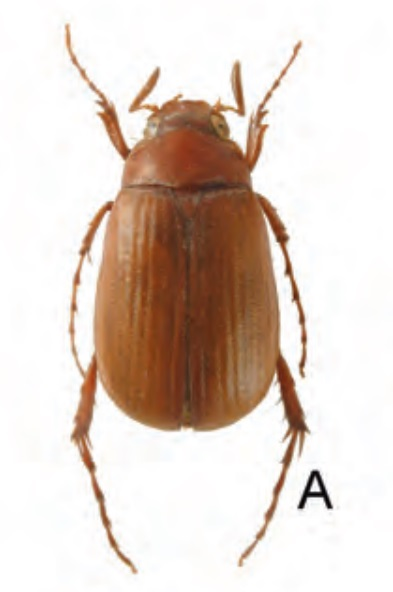

Scientific classification
- Kingdom: Animalia
- Phylum: Arthropoda
- Clade: Pancrustacea
- Class: Insecta
- Order: Coleoptera
- Suborder: Polyphaga
- Infraorder: Scarabaeiformia
- Family: Scarabaeidae
- Genus: Sericania
- Species: S. hazarensis

Binomial name
- Sericania hazarensis Ahrens, 2004

= Sericania hazarensis =

Species of beetle

Sericania hazarensis is a species of beetle of the family Scarabaeidae. It is found in the Indus-Himalaya.

== Description ==
Adults reach a length of about 7.6-9.1 mm. They have a reddish-brown, shining, elongated-oval body, often with an iridescent sheen dorsally, and almost completely glabrous dorsally, with only a few bristles on the pronotum and elytra and a fine, short hairs on the elytra.

== Etymology ==
The species name refers to one of its type locations, Hazara.
