= Nipponoserica dahongshanica =

Scientific classification
- Kingdom: Animalia
- Phylum: Arthropoda
- Class: Insecta
- Order: Coleoptera
- Suborder: Polyphaga
- Infraorder: Scarabaeiformia
- Family: Scarabaeidae
- Genus: Nipponoserica
- Species: N. dahongshanica

Binomial name
- Nipponoserica dahongshanica Ahrens, 2005

Species of beetle

Nipponoserica dahongshanica is a species of beetle of the family Scarabaeidae. It is found in China (Hubei).

== Description ==
Adults reach a length of about 8 mm. They have an oblong body. The dorsal surface is reddish brown, with a darker frons. The ventral surface is dark brown and the antennae are yellowish brown. The dorsal surface is shiny and glabrous.

== Etymology ==
The species name refers to its occurrence in the Dahongshan mountains.
