= Xenoserica matthiasi =

Scientific classification
- Kingdom: Animalia
- Phylum: Arthropoda
- Class: Insecta
- Order: Coleoptera
- Suborder: Polyphaga
- Infraorder: Scarabaeiformia
- Family: Scarabaeidae
- Genus: Xenoserica
- Species: X. matthiasi

Binomial name
- Xenoserica matthiasi Shrestha, Eberle & Ahrens, 2012

Species of beetle

Xenoserica matthiasi is a species of beetle of the family Scarabaeidae. It is found in Nepal.

== Description ==
Adults reach a length of about 11.2 mm. They have a dark reddish brown, oblong body. The elytral striae are reddish and the antennae are yellow. The dorsal surface is dull and, except for a few short setae on the elytra, glabrous.

== Etymology ==
The species is named after its collector, Matthias Hartmann.
