= Sericania serripes =

Scientific classification
- Kingdom: Animalia
- Phylum: Arthropoda
- Class: Insecta
- Order: Coleoptera
- Suborder: Polyphaga
- Infraorder: Scarabaeiformia
- Family: Scarabaeidae
- Genus: Sericania
- Species: S. serripes

Binomial name
- Sericania serripes Nomura, 1973

Synonyms
- Sericania ohtsukai Miyake, 1988

Species of beetle

Sericania serripes is a species of beetle of the family Scarabaeidae. It is found in Japan.

== Description ==
Adults reach a length of about 10.2–11.5 mm. They have a dark red-brown to blackish-brown, elongate-oval body. The head is black and the margins of the pronotum are reddish brown, The antennal club is yellowish brown.
