= Sericania marginata =

Scientific classification
- Kingdom: Animalia
- Phylum: Arthropoda
- Class: Insecta
- Order: Coleoptera
- Suborder: Polyphaga
- Infraorder: Scarabaeiformia
- Family: Scarabaeidae
- Genus: Sericania
- Species: S. marginata

Binomial name
- Sericania marginata Nomura, 1973

Synonyms
- Sericania suturalis Nomura, 1976

Species of beetle

Sericania marginata is a species of beetle of the family Scarabaeidae. It is found in Japan.

== Description ==
Adults reach a length of about 8–9 mm. They have a piceous, elongate-oval body, with reddish brown spots in the middle of the base and at the sides of the pronotum. The elytra are yellow-brown, except for the blackish sutural and lateral margins. The antennae are dark brown. The dorsal surface, antennae and legs are shining, with a coppery lustre on the piceous areas.
