= Sericania bhojpurensis =

Scientific classification
- Kingdom: Animalia
- Phylum: Arthropoda
- Clade: Pancrustacea
- Class: Insecta
- Order: Coleoptera
- Suborder: Polyphaga
- Infraorder: Scarabaeiformia
- Family: Scarabaeidae
- Genus: Sericania
- Species: S. bhojpurensis

Binomial name
- Sericania bhojpurensis Ahrens, 2004

Species of beetle

Sericania bhojpurensis is a species of beetle of the family Scarabaeidae. It is found in eastern-central Nepal.

== Description ==
Adults reach a length of about 6.3-6.8 mm. They have a yellow-brown slender, elongate-oval body. Both the ventral and dorsal surfaces are shiny, almost completely glabrous dorsally, with only the pronotum, and elytral margins with some hairs.

== Etymology ==
The species name refers to its occurrence in the Bhojpur District.
