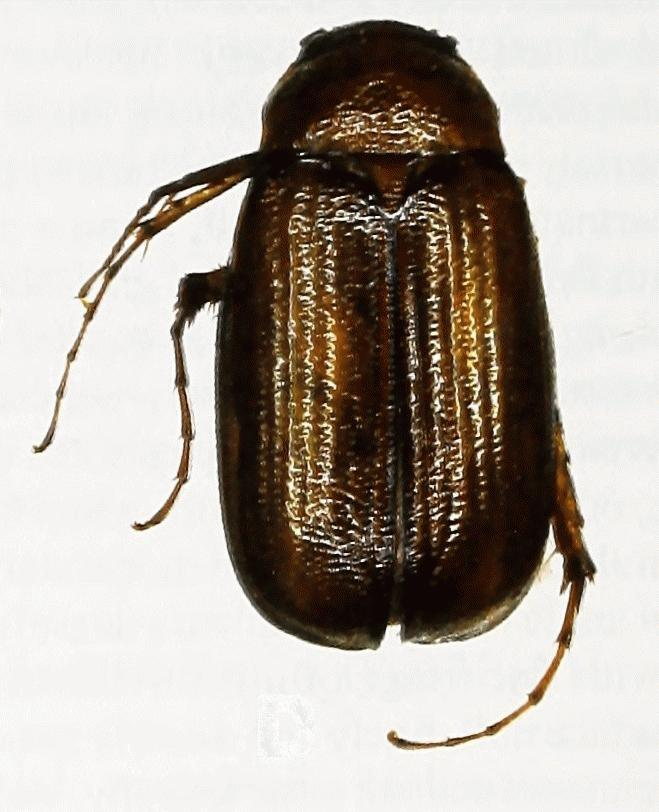

Scientific classification
- Kingdom: Animalia
- Phylum: Arthropoda
- Clade: Pancrustacea
- Class: Insecta
- Order: Coleoptera
- Suborder: Polyphaga
- Infraorder: Scarabaeiformia
- Family: Scarabaeidae
- Genus: Sericania
- Species: S. khandbariensis

Binomial name
- Sericania khandbariensis Ahrens & Fabrizi, 2011

= Sericania khandbariensis =

Species of beetle

Sericania khandbariensis is a species of beetle of the family Scarabaeidae. It is found in Nepal.

== Description ==
Adults reach a length of about 6.4–6.5 mm. They have a yellowish brown, oblong body. They are entirely shiny and sparsely setose.

== Etymology ==
The species name refers to the name of the district of the type locality.
