= Sericania besucheti =

Scientific classification
- Kingdom: Animalia
- Phylum: Arthropoda
- Clade: Pancrustacea
- Class: Insecta
- Order: Coleoptera
- Suborder: Polyphaga
- Infraorder: Scarabaeiformia
- Family: Scarabaeidae
- Genus: Sericania
- Species: S. besucheti

Binomial name
- Sericania besucheti Ahrens, 2004

Species of beetle

Sericania besucheti is a species of beetle of the family Scarabaeidae. It is found in the Indus-Himalaya.

== Description ==
Adults reach a length of about 8.3 mm. They have a reddish-brown, elongated-oval body. The dorsal surface is shiny (often with an iridescent sheen) and almost completely glabrous, with only a few bristles on the pronotum and elytral margins and some fine, short hairs on the elytra.

== Etymology ==
The species is named for Claude Besuchet, one of the collectors of the type specimen.
