= Sericania angulata =

Scientific classification
- Kingdom: Animalia
- Phylum: Arthropoda
- Clade: Pancrustacea
- Class: Insecta
- Order: Coleoptera
- Suborder: Polyphaga
- Infraorder: Scarabaeiformia
- Family: Scarabaeidae
- Genus: Sericania
- Species: S. angulata

Binomial name
- Sericania angulata (Lewis, 1895)

Synonyms
- Serica angulata Lewis, 1895

Species of beetle

Sericania angulata is a species of beetle of the family Scarabaeidae. It is found in Japan (Shikoku and Kyushu).

== Description ==
Adults reach a length of about 10 mm. They have an elongate, piceous, opaque body, with a shining head. The clypeus is very densely and somewhat rugosely punctate, between the eyes the punctures are larger and not quite so closely set. The anterior angles of the thorax are acute and prominent, while the lateral edge bulges out in the middle. The punctures are much smaller and more scattered than those of the head, with an obscure reddish disk in the middle of the lateral edge and a narrow reddish margin at the base. The elytra are irregularly punctured. The antennae and legs are pitchy red.
