= Sericania hidana =

Scientific classification
- Kingdom: Animalia
- Phylum: Arthropoda
- Clade: Pancrustacea
- Class: Insecta
- Order: Coleoptera
- Suborder: Polyphaga
- Infraorder: Scarabaeiformia
- Family: Scarabaeidae
- Genus: Sericania
- Species: S. hidana

Binomial name
- Sericania hidana Niijima & Kinoshita, 1923

Species of beetle

Sericania hidana is a species of beetle of the family Scarabaeidae. It is found in Japan.

== Description ==
Adults reach a length of about 11 mm. They have a shiny, blackish-brown, elongate body.
