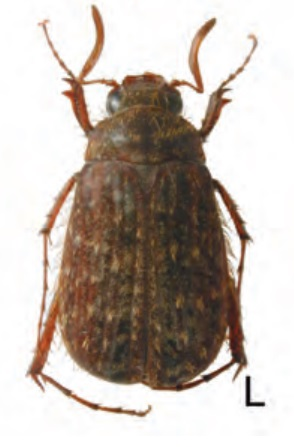

Scientific classification
- Kingdom: Animalia
- Phylum: Arthropoda
- Class: Insecta
- Order: Coleoptera
- Suborder: Polyphaga
- Infraorder: Scarabaeiformia
- Family: Scarabaeidae
- Genus: Xenoserica
- Species: X. karnaliensis

Binomial name
- Xenoserica karnaliensis (Ahrens, 1999)

Synonyms
- Serica karnaliensis Ahrens, 1999

= Xenoserica karnaliensis =

Species of beetle

Xenoserica karnaliensis is a species of beetle of the family Scarabaeidae. It is found in western Nepal.

== Description ==
Adults reach a length of about 10.4-10.6 mm. They have a dark brown, elongate body. The elytral stripes are reddish brown. The upper surface is mostly dull and there are scattered, short hairs. There are long, erect hairs on the head and pronotum.
