= Xenoserica pindarensis =

Scientific classification
- Kingdom: Animalia
- Phylum: Arthropoda
- Class: Insecta
- Order: Coleoptera
- Suborder: Polyphaga
- Infraorder: Scarabaeiformia
- Family: Scarabaeidae
- Genus: Xenoserica
- Species: X. pindarensis

Binomial name
- Xenoserica pindarensis (Ahrens, 2000)

Synonyms
- Nipponoserica pindarensis Ahrens, 2000

Species of beetle

Xenoserica pindarensis is a species of beetle of the family Scarabaeidae. It is found in India (Uttarakhand).

== Description ==
Adults reach a length of about 11–12.1 mm. They have a reddish-brown, elongate body. They are mostly dull and the upper side is almost completely glabrous, except for the cilia along the margins of the pronotum and elytra.

== Etymology ==
The species is named after its type locality, the Pindar Valley.
