= Sericania =

Scientific classification
- Kingdom: Animalia
- Phylum: Arthropoda
- Class: Insecta
- Order: Coleoptera
- Suborder: Polyphaga
- Infraorder: Scarabaeiformia
- Family: Scarabaeidae
- Subfamily: Sericinae
- Tribe: Sericini
- Genus: Sericania; Motschulsky, 1860

Genus of leaf beetles

Sericania is a genus of beetles belonging to the family Scarabaeidae.

== Species ==
- Sericania alternata Sawada, 1938
- Sericania angulata (Lewis, 1895)
- Sericania awana Nomura, 1976
- Sericania babaulti Ahrens, 2004
- Sericania besucheti Ahrens, 2004
- Sericania bhojpurensis Ahrens, 2004
- Sericania carinata Brenske, 1898
- Sericania chikuzensis Sawada, 1938
- Sericania costulata (Moser, 1915)
- Sericania dispar Ahrens, 2004
- Sericania dubiosa Ahrens, 2004
- Sericania elongata Nomura, 1976
- Sericania fuscolineata Motschulsky, 1860
- Sericania galloisi Nijima & Kinoshita, 1927
- Sericania gilgitensis Ahrens, 2004
- Sericania hazarensis Ahrens, 2004
- Sericania heinzi Ahrens, 2004
- Sericania hidana Nijima & Kinoshita, 1923
- Sericania kadowakii Nakane, 1983
- Sericania kashmirensis (Moser, 1919)
- Sericania khagana Ahrens, 2004
- Sericania khandbariensis Ahrens & Fabrizi, 2011
- Sericania kirai Sawada, 1938
- Sericania kleebergi Ahrens, 2004
- Sericania kobayashii Nomura, 1976
- Sericania koryoensis Murayama, 1935
- Sericania kurilensis Medvedev, 1952
- Sericania laeticula (Sharp, 1878)
- Sericania latisulcata Murayama, 1941
- Sericania lewisi Arrow, 1913
- Sericania loebli Ahrens, 2004
- Sericania mara Ahrens, 2004
- Sericania marginata Nomura, 1973
- Sericania matusitai Sawada, 1938
- Sericania mela Ahrens, 2004
- Sericania mimica Lewis, 1895
- Sericania miyakei Nomura, 1960
- Sericania nepalensis (Frey, 1965)
- Sericania ohirai Sawada, 1960
- Sericania ohtakei Sawada, 1955
- Sericania opaca Nomura, 1973
- Sericania pacis Ahrens, 2004
- Sericania piattellai Ahrens, 2004
- Sericania poonchensis Ahrens, 2004
- Sericania quadrifoliata (Lewis, 1895)
- Sericania sachalinensis Matsumura, 1911
- Sericania serripes Nomura, 1973
- Sericania shikokuana Nakane, 1954
- Sericania sinuata Nomura, 1959
- Sericania swatensis Ahrens, 2004
- Sericania tohokuensis Sawada, 1938
- Sericania torva Ahrens, 2004
- Sericania yamauchii Sawada, 1938
- Sericania yamayai Kobayashi & Fujioka, 2008
- Sericania yanoi Kobayashi, 2014

== Selected former species ==
- Sericania kompira Miyake & Sano, 1996
