= Nipponoserica shanghaiensis =

Scientific classification
- Kingdom: Animalia
- Phylum: Arthropoda
- Class: Insecta
- Order: Coleoptera
- Suborder: Polyphaga
- Infraorder: Scarabaeiformia
- Family: Scarabaeidae
- Genus: Nipponoserica
- Species: N. shanghaiensis

Binomial name
- Nipponoserica shanghaiensis Ahrens, 2004

Species of beetle

Nipponoserica shanghaiensis is a species of beetle of the family Scarabaeidae. It is found in China (Shanghai).

== Description ==
Adults reach a length of about 8.8 mm. They have a yellowish-brown, oblong body, with a dark frons. The dorsal surface is shiny and glabrous.

== Etymology ==
The species is named after its type locality, Shanghai.
