= Omaloplia flava =

Scientific classification
- Kingdom: Animalia
- Phylum: Arthropoda
- Clade: Pancrustacea
- Class: Insecta
- Order: Coleoptera
- Suborder: Polyphaga
- Infraorder: Scarabaeiformia
- Family: Scarabaeidae
- Genus: Omaloplia
- Species: O. flava

Binomial name
- Omaloplia flava (Brenske, 1895)

Synonyms
- Homaloplia flava Brenske, 1895

Species of beetle

Omaloplia flava is a species of beetle of the family Scarabaeidae. It is found in Ethiopia.

== Description ==
Adults reach a length of about 6 mm (0.24 in). They are yellowish, opaque, with a faint iridescent sheen. They are closely related to Omaloplia irideomicans, but the latter is blackish-brown and has a broadly emarginate clypeus.
