= Omaloplia lonae =

Scientific classification
- Kingdom: Animalia
- Phylum: Arthropoda
- Class: Insecta
- Order: Coleoptera
- Suborder: Polyphaga
- Infraorder: Scarabaeiformia
- Family: Scarabaeidae
- Genus: Omaloplia
- Species: O. lonae

Binomial name
- Omaloplia lonae (Schatzmayr, 1923)

Synonyms
- Homaloplia lonae Schatzmayr, 1923

Species of beetle

Omaloplia lonae is a species of beetle of the family Scarabaeidae. It is found in Albania, Austria, Bosnia Herzegovina, Croatia, North Macedonia, Montenegro and Slovenia.

== Description ==
Adults reach a length of about 5.8–8.4 mm. They are very similar to Omaloplia nigromarginata, but the lateral margin of the elytra is strongly S-shaped, the colour of the elytra is sometimes black and the hairs on the elytra may be light or dark, while they are always light in O. nigromarginata.
