= Neomaladera barbara =

Scientific classification
- Kingdom: Animalia
- Phylum: Arthropoda
- Class: Insecta
- Order: Coleoptera
- Suborder: Polyphaga
- Infraorder: Scarabaeiformia
- Family: Scarabaeidae
- Genus: Neomaladera
- Species: N. barbara

Binomial name
- Neomaladera barbara (Lucas, 1846)

Synonyms
- Brachyphylla barbara Lucas, 1846; Euserica pardoi Cobos, 1961; Serica (Euserica) lanata Escalera, 1925; Serica (Euserica) susiana Escalera, 1913; Serica (Euserica) mecheriensis Pic, 1898; Serica pilicollis Burmeister, 1855; Homaloplia substriata Küster, 1849

Species of beetle

Neomaladera barbara is a species of beetle of the family Scarabaeidae. It is found in Algeria, Morocco and Tunesia.

== Description ==
Adults reach a length of about 5–6 mm. They are very similar to Omaloplia ruricola, but are more deeply punctate. The elytra are striated and punctate, the intervals with strongly marked dots. It is greenish, with iridescent elytra of various colours. The head has fairly strong, dense, and deeply marked punctation. The antennae are greenish. The thorax is punctate, and the punctures are large and very sparse. The under surface and legs are also punctate. There are sparse, short yellowish hairs on the upper and lower surfaces (particularly on the elytra).
