= Omaloplia analis =

Scientific classification
- Kingdom: Animalia
- Phylum: Arthropoda
- Clade: Pancrustacea
- Class: Insecta
- Order: Coleoptera
- Suborder: Polyphaga
- Infraorder: Scarabaeiformia
- Family: Scarabaeidae
- Genus: Omaloplia
- Species: O. analis

Binomial name
- Omaloplia analis Guérin-Méneville, 1849

Species of beetle

Omaloplia analis is a species of beetle of the family Scarabaeidae. It is found in Ethiopia and Senegal.

== Description ==
They are very similar to Omaloplia vittata, but the yellow elytra have on the disc only two longitudinal bands which do not quite reach the outer edge.
