= Omaloplia mutilata =

Scientific classification
- Kingdom: Animalia
- Phylum: Arthropoda
- Class: Insecta
- Order: Coleoptera
- Suborder: Polyphaga
- Infraorder: Scarabaeiformia
- Family: Scarabaeidae
- Genus: Omaloplia
- Species: O. mutilata

Binomial name
- Omaloplia mutilata (Fairmaire, 1892)

Synonyms
- Homaloplia mutilata Fairmaire, 1892; Homaloplia corpulenta Sahlberg, 1908

Species of beetle

Omaloplia mutilata is a species of beetle of the family Scarabaeidae. It is found in Turkey.

== Description ==
Adults reach a length of about 7.5–8.3 mm. The body, legs and elytra are black and moderately shiny. The elytra, pygidium and underside are inconspicuously and extremely short-haired.
