= Neomaladera longitarsis =

Scientific classification
- Kingdom: Animalia
- Phylum: Arthropoda
- Class: Insecta
- Order: Coleoptera
- Suborder: Polyphaga
- Infraorder: Scarabaeiformia
- Family: Scarabaeidae
- Genus: Neomaladera
- Species: N. longitarsis

Binomial name
- Neomaladera longitarsis (Escalera, 1925)

Synonyms
- Serica (Euserica) longitarsis Escalera, 1925; Serica (Euserica) iridescens Escalera, 1925

Species of beetle

Neomaladera longitarsis is a species of beetle of the family Scarabaeidae. It is found in Morocco.

== Description ==
Adults reach a length of about 6–8 mm. They are black and shiny. Males are iridescent, while females are somewhat dull with intense violet iridescence. The dorsal surface is nearly glabrous, with only a few fine, moderately long, golden setae on the sides of the pronotum. The elytra of the males are glabrous or with a few barely visible, very short, widely spaced setae. These setae are more visible in females, but are only found on the alternate striae.
