= Omaloplia baraudi =

Scientific classification
- Kingdom: Animalia
- Phylum: Arthropoda
- Class: Insecta
- Order: Coleoptera
- Suborder: Polyphaga
- Infraorder: Scarabaeiformia
- Family: Scarabaeidae
- Genus: Omaloplia
- Species: O. baraudi

Binomial name
- Omaloplia baraudi (Galante, 1985)

Synonyms
- Homaloplia baraudi Galante, 1985

Species of beetle

Omaloplia baraudi is a species of beetle of the family Scarabaeidae. It is found in Bulgaria, Greece, North Macedonia, Romania, Iran and Turkey.

== Description ==
Adults reach a length of about 6.1–8.3 mm. They have a slightly shiny to dull body. The odd-numbered intervals of the elytra are indistinct and sparsely hairy.

== Subspecies ==
- Omaloplia baraudi baraudi (Iran, Turkey)
- Omaloplia baraudi pontica Ádám, 1994 (Bulgaria, Greece, Macedonia, Romania, Turkey)
