= Neomaladera neglecta =

Scientific classification
- Kingdom: Animalia
- Phylum: Arthropoda
- Class: Insecta
- Order: Coleoptera
- Suborder: Polyphaga
- Infraorder: Scarabaeiformia
- Family: Scarabaeidae
- Genus: Neomaladera
- Species: N. neglecta

Binomial name
- Neomaladera neglecta Baraud, 1965

Species of beetle

Neomaladera neglecta is a species of beetle of the family Scarabaeidae. It is found in Morocco.

== Description ==
Adults reach a length of about 7–8 mm. They are mostly entirely black, shiny and strongly iridescent (mainly on the elytra). Sometimes, the scutellum is brownish or entirely ferruginous brown.
