= Omaloplia polita =

Scientific classification
- Kingdom: Animalia
- Phylum: Arthropoda
- Class: Insecta
- Order: Coleoptera
- Suborder: Polyphaga
- Infraorder: Scarabaeiformia
- Family: Scarabaeidae
- Genus: Omaloplia
- Species: O. polita

Binomial name
- Omaloplia polita (Baraud, 1965)

Synonyms
- Homaloplia polita Baraud, 1965

Species of beetle

Omaloplia polita is a species of beetle of the family Scarabaeidae. It is found in Greece.

== Description ==
Adults reach a length of about 7-7.5 mm. The head, pronotum and scutellum are shiny black, while the elytra are yellowish-brown with a shiny and transparent suture and sides. The antennae (except for the club), palps, tarsi and sometimes anterior tibiae are yellowish-brown or reddish and the hairs are entirely yellow.
