= Omaloplia gobbii =

Scientific classification
- Kingdom: Animalia
- Phylum: Arthropoda
- Class: Insecta
- Order: Coleoptera
- Suborder: Polyphaga
- Infraorder: Scarabaeiformia
- Family: Scarabaeidae
- Genus: Omaloplia
- Species: O. gobbii

Binomial name
- Omaloplia gobbii (Piattella & Sabatinelli, 1993)

Synonyms
- Homaloplia gobbii Piattella & Sabatinelli, 1993

Species of beetle

Omaloplia gobbii is a species of beetle of the family Scarabaeidae. It is found in Greece.

== Description ==
Adults reach a length of about 6.2–7 mm. They have a black body. The upper surface is moderately shiny and distinctly hairy. The antennae are yellowish-brown with a dark club.
