= Omaloplia cerrutii =

Scientific classification
- Kingdom: Animalia
- Phylum: Arthropoda
- Class: Insecta
- Order: Coleoptera
- Suborder: Polyphaga
- Infraorder: Scarabaeiformia
- Family: Scarabaeidae
- Genus: Omaloplia
- Species: O. cerrutii

Binomial name
- Omaloplia cerrutii (Sabatinelli, 1977)

Synonyms
- Homaloplia cerrutii Sabatinelli, 1977

Species of beetle

Omaloplia cerrutii is a species of beetle of the family Scarabaeidae. It is found in Albania, Bulgaria, Greece and Turkey.

== Description ==
Adults reach a length of about 6.4–7.9 mm. They have an oval body with light pubescence. The head and prothorax are black, while the elytra are light brownish.

== Etymology ==
The species is named after Marcello Cerruti.
