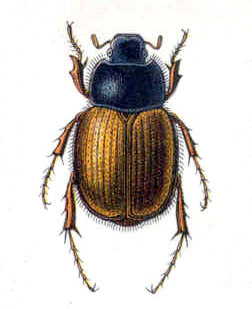
- Omaloplia ruricola

Scientific classification
- Kingdom: Animalia
- Phylum: Arthropoda
- Clade: Pancrustacea
- Class: Insecta
- Order: Coleoptera
- Suborder: Polyphaga
- Infraorder: Scarabaeiformia
- Family: Scarabaeidae
- Subtribe: Sericina
- Genus: Omaloplia; Schönherr, 1817

Synonyms
- Homaloplia Redtenbacher, 1845; Brachyphylla Mulsant, 1842

= Omaloplia =

Genus of beetles

Omaloplia is a genus of beetles belonging to the subfamily Scarabaeidae.

Species:

- Subgenus Acarina Baraud, 1965
  - Omaloplia labrata (Burmeister, 1855)
  - Omaloplia ottomana (Baraud, 1965)
  - Omaloplia spireae (Pallas, 1773)
- Subgenus Omaloplia
  - Omaloplia analis Guérin-Méneville, 1849
  - Omaloplia baraudi (Galante, 1985)
  - Omaloplia caeca (Baraud, 1965)
  - Omaloplia cerrutii (Sabatinelli, 1977)
  - Omaloplia corcyrae (Baraud, 1965)
  - Omaloplia depilis Müller, 1910
  - Omaloplia diabolica (Reitter, 1887)
  - Omaloplia erebea (Baraud, 1965)
  - Omaloplia erythroptera Frivaldszky, 1835
  - Omaloplia flava (Brenske, 1895)
  - Omaloplia gibbosa (Baraud, 1965)
  - Omaloplia gobbii (Piattella & Sabatinelli, 1993)
  - Omaloplia graeca (Reitter, 1887)
  - Omaloplia hericia (Chobaut, 1907)
  - Omaloplia illyrica (Baraud, 1965)
  - Omaloplia irideomicans (Fairmaire, 1884)
  - Omaloplia iris (Reitter, 1887)
  - Omaloplia lonae (Schatzmayr, 1923)
  - Omaloplia minuta (Brenske, 1887)
  - Omaloplia mutilata (Fairmaire, 1892)
  - Omaloplia nigromarginata (Herbst, 1786)
  - Omaloplia picticollis Fairmaire, 1897
  - Omaloplia polita (Baraud, 1965)
  - Omaloplia pubipennis Rössner & Ahrens, 2004
  - Omaloplia ruricola (Fabricius, 1775)
  - Omaloplia settorum Uliana, 2014
  - Omaloplia vittata Guérin-Méneville, 1847
