= Omaloplia labrata =

Scientific classification
- Kingdom: Animalia
- Phylum: Arthropoda
- Class: Insecta
- Order: Coleoptera
- Suborder: Polyphaga
- Infraorder: Scarabaeiformia
- Family: Scarabaeidae
- Genus: Omaloplia
- Species: O. labrata

Binomial name
- Omaloplia labrata (Burmeister, 1855)

Synonyms
- Homaloplia labrata Burmeister, 1855; Homaloplia labrata nigra Petrovitz, 1971; Homaloplia subsinuata Burmeister, 1855

Species of beetle

Omaloplia labrata is a species of beetle of the family Scarabaeidae. It is found in Greece, Iran, Iraq, Israel, Jordan, Lebanon, Syria and Turkey.

== Description ==
Adults reach a length of about 5.9–8 mm. They have a black body. The upper surface is weakly to distinctly shiny and distinctly hairy. The antennae are yellowish-brown with a dark club or entirely yellowish-brown.
