= Omaloplia iris =

Scientific classification
- Kingdom: Animalia
- Phylum: Arthropoda
- Class: Insecta
- Order: Coleoptera
- Suborder: Polyphaga
- Infraorder: Scarabaeiformia
- Family: Scarabaeidae
- Genus: Omaloplia
- Species: O. iris

Binomial name
- Omaloplia iris (Reitter, 1887)

Synonyms
- Homaloplia iris Reitter, 1887; Homaloplia iris atrata Baraud, 1965

Species of beetle

Omaloplia iris is a species of beetle of the family Scarabaeidae. It is found in Bulgaria, Greece, North Macedonia, Montenegro, Romania and Serbia.

== Description ==
Adults reach a length of about 6.7–8.8 mm. They have a black body. The upper surface is dull to slightly shiny and distinctly hairy. The antennae are yellowish-brown with a dark club. Sometimes, the basal and middle segment of the club are also yellowish-brown.
