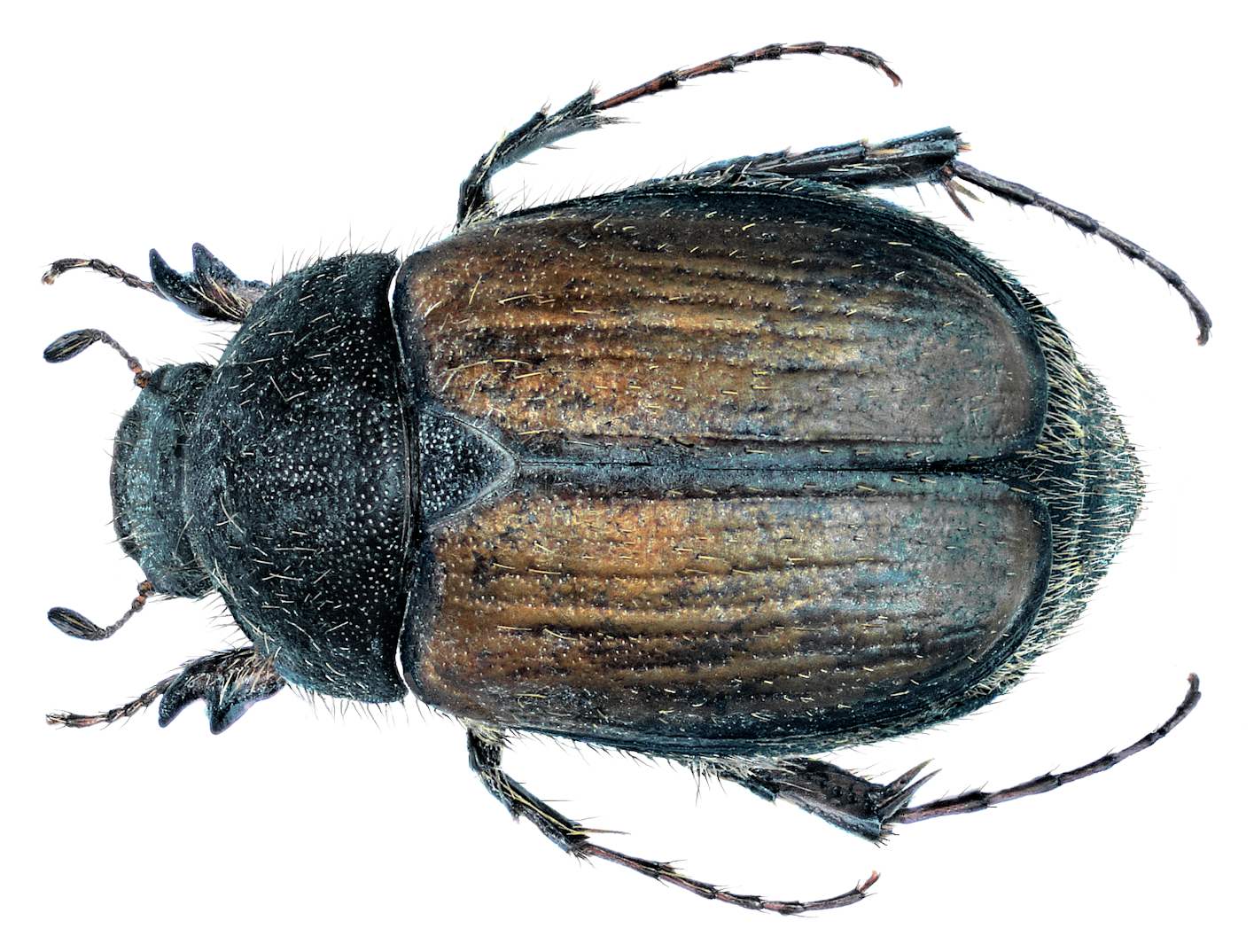

Scientific classification
- Kingdom: Animalia
- Phylum: Arthropoda
- Class: Insecta
- Order: Coleoptera
- Suborder: Polyphaga
- Infraorder: Scarabaeiformia
- Family: Scarabaeidae
- Genus: Omaloplia
- Species: O. corcyrae

Binomial name
- Omaloplia corcyrae (Baraud, 1965)

Synonyms
- Homaloplia nicolasi corcyrae Baraud, 1965

= Omaloplia corcyrae =

Species of beetle

Omaloplia corcyrae is a species of beetle of the family Scarabaeidae. It is found in Albania, Bosnia Herzegovina, Bulgaria, Croatia, Greece, Kosovo, North Macedonia, Montenegro, Romania, Serbia and Turkey.

== Description ==
Adults reach a length of about 5.8–8.4 mm. The body and legs are black. The upper surface is dull to slightly shiny. The antennae are yellowish-brown with a dark club.
