= Omaloplia ottomana =

Scientific classification
- Kingdom: Animalia
- Phylum: Arthropoda
- Class: Insecta
- Order: Coleoptera
- Suborder: Polyphaga
- Infraorder: Scarabaeiformia
- Family: Scarabaeidae
- Genus: Omaloplia
- Species: O. ottomana

Binomial name
- Omaloplia ottomana (Baraud, 1965)

Synonyms
- Homaloplia (Acarina) ottomana Baraud, 1965

Species of beetle

Omaloplia ottomana is a species of beetle of the family Scarabaeidae. It is found in Turkey.

== Description ==
Adults reach a length of about 6.1–7.2 mm. They have a black body. The upper surface is faintly shiny and distinctly hairy. The antennae are yellowish-brown with a dark club.
