= Omaloplia graeca =

Scientific classification
- Kingdom: Animalia
- Phylum: Arthropoda
- Class: Insecta
- Order: Coleoptera
- Suborder: Polyphaga
- Infraorder: Scarabaeiformia
- Family: Scarabaeidae
- Genus: Omaloplia
- Species: O. graeca

Binomial name
- Omaloplia graeca (Reitter, 1887)

Synonyms
- Homaloplia alternata graeca Reitter, 1887; Homaloplia polita attica Baraud, 1965; Homaloplia polita oetaea Baraud, 1965

Species of beetle

Omaloplia graeca is a species of beetle of the family Scarabaeidae. It is found in Greece and North Macedonia.

== Description ==
Adults reach a length of about 6.4 mm. They have a black body. The upper surface is moderately shiny and indistinctly hairy. The antennae are yellowish-brown with a dark club.
