= Omaloplia gibbosa =

Scientific classification
- Kingdom: Animalia
- Phylum: Arthropoda
- Class: Insecta
- Order: Coleoptera
- Suborder: Polyphaga
- Infraorder: Scarabaeiformia
- Family: Scarabaeidae
- Genus: Omaloplia
- Species: O. gibbosa

Binomial name
- Omaloplia gibbosa (Baraud, 1965)

Synonyms
- Homaloplia gibbosa Baraud, 1965; Homaloplia gibbosa atrata Baraud, 1965; Homaloplia gibbosa macedoniae Baraud, 1965

Species of beetle

Omaloplia gibbosa is a species of beetle of the family Scarabaeidae. It is found in Albania, Greece, North Macedonia, Montenegro and Turkey.

== Description ==
Adults reach a length of about 5.7–8.1 mm. They have a black body. The upper surface is faintly shiny and indistinctly hairy. The antennae are entirely yellowish-brown or yellowish-brown with a dark club.
