= Omaloplia spireae =

Scientific classification
- Kingdom: Animalia
- Phylum: Arthropoda
- Class: Insecta
- Order: Coleoptera
- Suborder: Polyphaga
- Infraorder: Scarabaeiformia
- Family: Scarabaeidae
- Genus: Omaloplia
- Species: O. spireae

Binomial name
- Omaloplia spireae (Pallas, 1773)

Synonyms
- Scarabaeus spireae Pallas, 1773; Acarina margaritacea Ádám, 1994; Homaloplia paupera adulta Reitter, 1902; Homaloplia sieversi Reitter, 1897; Homaloplia alternata intermedia Abeille De Perrin, 1895; Homaloplia alternata Küster, 1849; Omaloplia puberula Gebler, 1847; Omaloplia limbata Krynicki, 1832; Omaloplia hirta Gebler, 1830; Homaloplia (Acarina) longiclava Baraud, 1965

Species of beetle

Omaloplia spireae is a species of beetle of the family Scarabaeidae. It is found in Armenia, Azerbaijan, Austria, Bulgaria, China (Xinjiang), the Czech Republic, Georgia, Greece, Hungary, Iran, Kazakhstan, Romania, Russia, Serbia, Siberia, Slovakia, Turkey and Ukraine.

== Description ==
Adults reach a length of about 4.6–9 mm. They have a black body. The upper surface is slightly shiny and distinctly hairy. The antennae are yellowish-brown with a dark club.

== Subspecies ==
- Omaloplia spireae spireae (Armenia, Azerbaijan, Austria, Bulgaria, China:Xinjiang, Czech Republic, Georgia, Greece, Hungary, Iran, Kazakhstan, Romania, Russia, Serbia, Siberia, Slovakia, Turkey, Ukraine)
- Omaloplia spireae longiclava (Baraud, 1965) (Greece: Rhodos)
