= Omaloplia erebea =

Scientific classification
- Kingdom: Animalia
- Phylum: Arthropoda
- Class: Insecta
- Order: Coleoptera
- Suborder: Polyphaga
- Infraorder: Scarabaeiformia
- Family: Scarabaeidae
- Genus: Omaloplia
- Species: O. erebea

Binomial name
- Omaloplia erebea (Baraud, 1965)

Synonyms
- Homaloplia erebea Baraud, 1965; Homaloplia erebea atrata Baraud, 1965

Species of beetle

Omaloplia erebea is a species of beetle of the family Scarabaeidae. It is found in Turkey.

== Description ==
Adults reach a length of about 6.7–9.1 mm. They have a slightly shiny body. The legs are reddish-brown to black and the antennae are yellowish-brown with a darkened club. The hairs are yellowish or black.
