= Omaloplia diabolica =

Scientific classification
- Kingdom: Animalia
- Phylum: Arthropoda
- Class: Insecta
- Order: Coleoptera
- Suborder: Polyphaga
- Infraorder: Scarabaeiformia
- Family: Scarabaeidae
- Genus: Omaloplia
- Species: O. diabolica

Binomial name
- Omaloplia diabolica (Reitter, 1887)

Synonyms
- Homaloplia diabolica Reitter, 1887; Homaloplia diabolica albohirta Petrovitz, 1963; Homaloplia ursina Fairmaire, 1892

Species of beetle

Omaloplia diabolica is a species of beetle of the family Scarabaeidae. It is found in Syria and Turkey.

== Description ==
Adults reach a length of about 6.4–9.1 mm. They have a black body. The upper surface is moderately shiny, with long light or dark hairs. The antennae are black.
