= Neomaladera rugosula =

Scientific classification
- Kingdom: Animalia
- Phylum: Arthropoda
- Class: Insecta
- Order: Coleoptera
- Suborder: Polyphaga
- Infraorder: Scarabaeiformia
- Family: Scarabaeidae
- Genus: Neomaladera
- Species: N. rugosula

Binomial name
- Neomaladera rugosula (Escalera, 1914)

Synonyms
- Euserica rugosula Escalera, 1914

Species of beetle

Neomaladera rugosula is a species of beetle of the family Scarabaeidae. It is found in Morocco and possibly Algeria.

== Description ==
Adults reach a length of about 8 mm. The pronotum has strong, coarse, very closely spaced punctation. The elytra have raised ribs (especially the alternate ones), with the spaces between them irregularly punctate. There are long, erect, whitish setae arranged in rows.
