= Neomaladera grandiclava =

Scientific classification
- Kingdom: Animalia
- Phylum: Arthropoda
- Class: Insecta
- Order: Coleoptera
- Suborder: Polyphaga
- Infraorder: Scarabaeiformia
- Family: Scarabaeidae
- Genus: Neomaladera
- Species: N. grandiclava

Binomial name
- Neomaladera grandiclava (Escalera, 1925)

Synonyms
- Serica (Euserica) grandiclava Escalera, 1925

Species of beetle

Neomaladera grandiclava is a species of beetle of the family Scarabaeidae. It is found in Morocco.

== Description ==
Adults reach a length of about 6–8 mm. They have an intensely glossy black, short, rounded body, without a metallic sheen. They are glabrous on the thorax and elytra, except for the lateral cilia.
