= Neomaladera =

Scientific classification
- Kingdom: Animalia
- Phylum: Arthropoda
- Class: Insecta
- Order: Coleoptera
- Suborder: Polyphaga
- Infraorder: Scarabaeiformia
- Family: Scarabaeidae
- Subfamily: Sericinae
- Tribe: Sericini
- Genus: Neomaladera; Baraud, 1965

Genus of leaf beetles

Neomaladera is a genus of beetles belonging to the family Scarabaeidae.

== Species ==
- Neomaladera barbara (Lucas, 1846)
- Neomaladera grandiclava (Escalera, 1925)
- Neomaladera labriquei Keith, 2012
- Neomaladera longitarsis (Escalera, 1925)
- Neomaladera neglecta Baraud, 1965
- Neomaladera rugosula (Escalera, 1914)
- Neomaladera teluetica (Escalera, 1914)
