= Omaloplia depilis =

Scientific classification
- Kingdom: Animalia
- Phylum: Arthropoda
- Class: Insecta
- Order: Coleoptera
- Suborder: Polyphaga
- Infraorder: Scarabaeiformia
- Family: Scarabaeidae
- Genus: Omaloplia
- Species: O. depilis

Binomial name
- Omaloplia depilis Müller, 1910

Species of beetle

Omaloplia depilis is a species of beetle of the family Scarabaeidae. It is found in Greece.

== Description ==
Adults reach a length of about 7.1–7.8 mm. They have a dark reddish-brown to blackish-brown, dull to slightly shiny body. The upper surface is almost glabrous. The legs are lighter reddish-brown and the antennae are light reddish-brown with a dark club.
