= Omaloplia minuta =

Scientific classification
- Kingdom: Animalia
- Phylum: Arthropoda
- Class: Insecta
- Order: Coleoptera
- Suborder: Polyphaga
- Infraorder: Scarabaeiformia
- Family: Scarabaeidae
- Genus: Omaloplia
- Species: O. minuta

Binomial name
- Omaloplia minuta (Brenske, 1887)

Synonyms
- Homaloplia minuta Brenske, 1887; Homaloplia taygetana Kiesenwetter

Species of beetle

Omaloplia minuta is a species of beetle of the family Scarabaeidae. It is found in Greece.

== Description ==
Adults reach a length of about 4.5–5.8 mm. The body and legs are blackish-brown and the antennae are yellowish-brown. The upper surface is shiny and the hairs are yellowish-brown.
