= Omaloplia illyrica =

Scientific classification
- Kingdom: Animalia
- Phylum: Arthropoda
- Class: Insecta
- Order: Coleoptera
- Suborder: Polyphaga
- Infraorder: Scarabaeiformia
- Family: Scarabaeidae
- Genus: Omaloplia
- Species: O. illyrica

Binomial name
- Omaloplia illyrica (Baraud, 1965)

Synonyms
- Homaloplia illyrica Baraud, 1965

Species of beetle

Omaloplia illyrica is a species of beetle of the family Scarabaeidae. It is found in Albania, Bosnia Herzegovina, Bulgaria, Croatia, Greece, Kosovo, North Macedonia, Montenegro, Romania and Serbia.

== Description ==
Adults reach a length of about 6–8.2 mm. They have a black body. The upper surface is dull to slightly shiny and indistinctly hairy. The antennae are yellowish-brown with a dark club. The basal segment of the club is often also yellowish-brown.
