= Omaloplia hericia =

Scientific classification
- Kingdom: Animalia
- Phylum: Arthropoda
- Class: Insecta
- Order: Coleoptera
- Suborder: Polyphaga
- Infraorder: Scarabaeiformia
- Family: Scarabaeidae
- Genus: Omaloplia
- Species: O. hericia

Binomial name
- Omaloplia hericia (Chobaut, 1907)

Synonyms
- Homaloplia hericius Chobaut, 1907; Omaloplia rozneri Ádám, 1994; Omaloplia hericius majuscula Baraud, 1965; Homaloplia hericius cailloli Chobaut, 1907

Species of beetle

Omaloplia hericia is a species of beetle of the family Scarabaeidae. It is found in Bulgaria, France, Greece, Romania and Turkey.

== Description ==
Adults reach a length of about 6.3–8.9 mm. The body and legs are black. The upper surface is dull to slightly glossy and distinctly hairy. The antennae are yellowish-brown with a dark club.
