= Omaloplia pubipennis =

Scientific classification
- Kingdom: Animalia
- Phylum: Arthropoda
- Class: Insecta
- Order: Coleoptera
- Suborder: Polyphaga
- Infraorder: Scarabaeiformia
- Family: Scarabaeidae
- Genus: Omaloplia
- Species: O. pubipennis

Binomial name
- Omaloplia pubipennis Rössner & Ahrens, 2004

Species of beetle

Omaloplia pubipennis is a species of beetle of the family Scarabaeidae. It is found in Greece.

== Description ==
Adults reach a length of about 7.2 mm. The body and legs are black, with the tarsi lighter. The upper surface is slightly shiny. The hairs are yellowish-brown or brown.

== Etymology ==
The species name is derived from Latin pubes (meaning hair) and penna (meaning wings, elytron).
