= Omaloplia erythroptera =

Scientific classification
- Kingdom: Animalia
- Phylum: Arthropoda
- Class: Insecta
- Order: Coleoptera
- Suborder: Polyphaga
- Infraorder: Scarabaeiformia
- Family: Scarabaeidae
- Genus: Omaloplia
- Species: O. erythroptera

Binomial name
- Omaloplia erythroptera Frivaldszky, 1835

Synonyms
- Brachyphylla carbonaria Blanchard, 1850; Homaloplia transsylvanica Bielz, 1850

Species of beetle

Omaloplia erythroptera is a species of beetle of the family Scarabaeidae. It is found in Albania, Bosnia Herzegovina, Bulgaria, Croatia, Greece, Crete, Hungary, North Macedonia, Montenegro, Poland, Romania, Serbia, Turkey and Ukraine.

== Description ==
Adults reach a length of about 6.2–8.7 mm. They have a black body. The upper surface is weakly to moderately shiny and distinctly hairy. The antennae are more or less yellowish-brown with a dark club, but often entirely black and sometimes entirely yellowish-brown.
