= Neomaladera teluetica =

Scientific classification
- Kingdom: Animalia
- Phylum: Arthropoda
- Class: Insecta
- Order: Coleoptera
- Suborder: Polyphaga
- Infraorder: Scarabaeiformia
- Family: Scarabaeidae
- Genus: Neomaladera
- Species: N. teluetica

Binomial name
- Neomaladera teluetica (Escalera, 1914)

Synonyms
- Euserica teluetica Escalera, 1914

Species of beetle

Neomaladera teluetica is a species of beetle of the family Scarabaeidae. It is found in Morocco.

== Description ==
Adults reach a length of about 6–7 mm. They are entirely black and glossy, with a faint iridescence. The head has very strong, dense punctation. The pronotum has rather fine, sparse punctation and is covered with sparse, yellow, long hairs. The elytra have densely punctate striae, with a few small, short, yellow cilia scattered on them.
