= Omaloplia settorum =

Scientific classification
- Kingdom: Animalia
- Phylum: Arthropoda
- Clade: Pancrustacea
- Class: Insecta
- Order: Coleoptera
- Suborder: Polyphaga
- Infraorder: Scarabaeiformia
- Family: Scarabaeidae
- Genus: Omaloplia
- Species: O. settorum

Binomial name
- Omaloplia settorum Uliana, 2014

Species of beetle

Omaloplia settorum is a species of beetle of the family Scarabaeidae. It is found in Turkey (Central Cappadocia).

== Description ==
Adults reach a length of about 9 mm (0.35 in). They are dull and uniformly black, both on the dorsal and the ventral surface, except part of the antennae, palps and tarsi, which are dark brown.

== Etymology ==
The species is dedicated to the brothers Giancarlo and Alberto Sette, who first collected the species.
