= Omaloplia caeca =

Scientific classification
- Kingdom: Animalia
- Phylum: Arthropoda
- Class: Insecta
- Order: Coleoptera
- Suborder: Polyphaga
- Infraorder: Scarabaeiformia
- Family: Scarabaeidae
- Genus: Omaloplia
- Species: O. caeca

Binomial name
- Omaloplia caeca (Baraud, 1965)

Synonyms
- Homaloplia caeca Baraud, 1965; Omaloplia balcanica Ádám, 1994

Species of beetle

Omaloplia caeca is a species of beetle of the family Scarabaeidae. It is found in Bulgaria, Greece, Hungary, North Macedonia, Montenegro and Serbia.

== Description ==
They are large and the upper surface is distinctly hairy. The margin of the elytra is usually strongly S-shaped.
