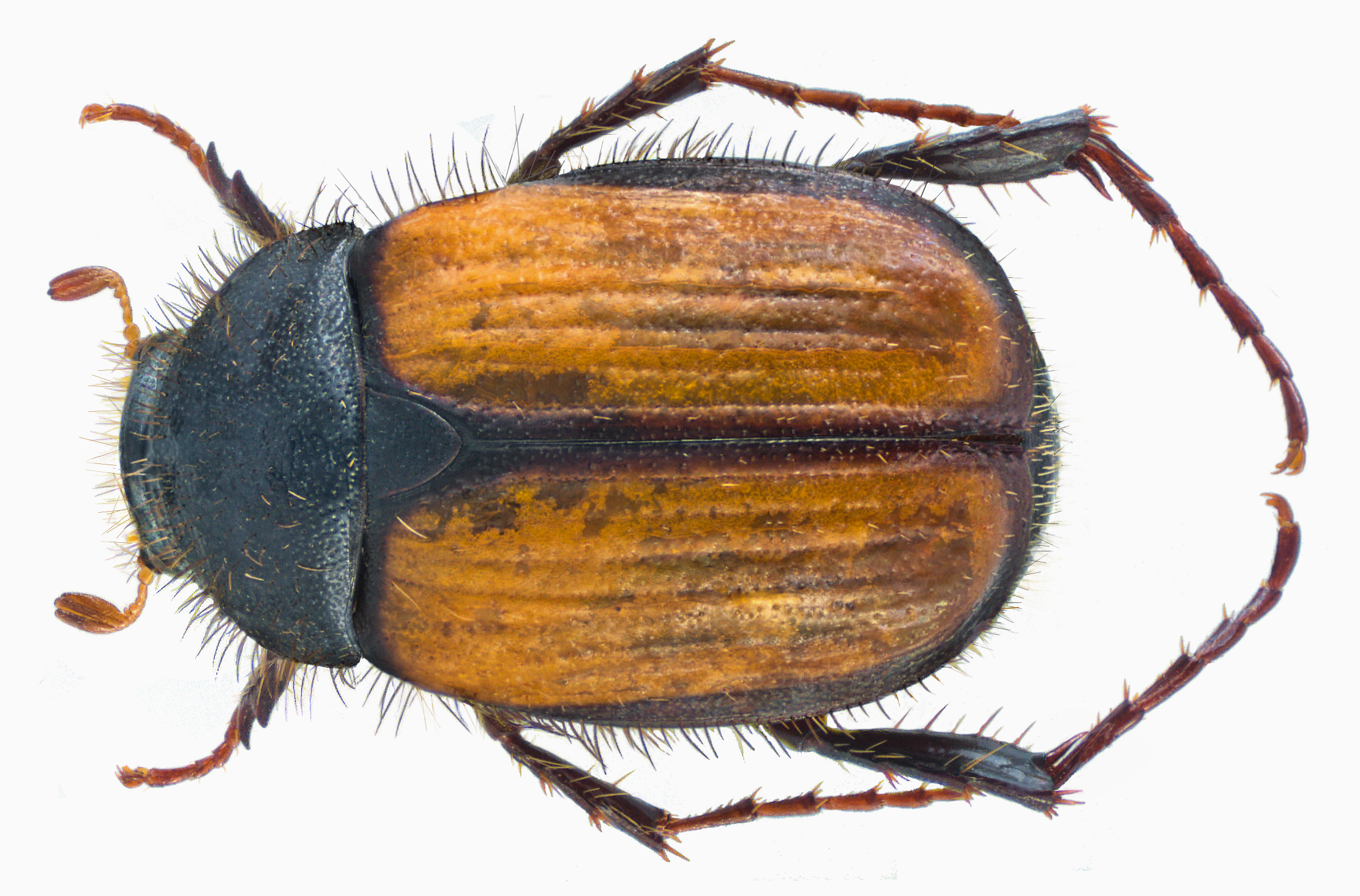

Scientific classification
- Kingdom: Animalia
- Phylum: Arthropoda
- Class: Insecta
- Order: Coleoptera
- Suborder: Polyphaga
- Infraorder: Scarabaeiformia
- Family: Scarabaeidae
- Genus: Omaloplia
- Species: O. ruricola

Binomial name
- Omaloplia ruricola (Fabricius, 1775)

Synonyms
- Melolontha ruricola Fabricius, 1775; Homaloplia svanetica Medvedev & Dzambazishvili, 1973; Homaloplia marginata atrata Baraud, 1965; Homaloplia nicolasi tergestina Baraud, 1965; Homaloplia arnoldii Medvedev, 1952; Homaloplia kiritshenkoi Medvedev, 1952; Homaloplia marginata nigra Mikšić, 1949; Homaloplia fritschi Reitter, 1905; Homaloplia populi Gistel, 1857; Homaloplia pruinosa Küster, 1849; Brachyphylla ruricola disca Mulsant, 1842; Brachyphylla ruricola immarginata Mulsant, 1842; Brachyphylla ruricola obscura Mulsant, 1842; Scarabaeus atratus Fourcroy, 1785; Melolontha floricola Laicharting, 1781; Melolontha humeralis Fabricius, 1775; Scarabaeus marginatus Fuessly, 1775; Homaloplia nicolasi Baraud, 1965; Homaloplia epirota Baraud, 1965

= Omaloplia ruricola =

Species of beetle

Omaloplia ruricola is a species of beetle of the family Scarabaeidae. It is found in Albania, Austria, Belarus, Belgium, Bosnia Herzegovina, Bulgaria, Crimea, Croatia, Czech Republic, France, Georgia, Germany, Great Britain, Greece, Hungary, Italy, Kosovo, Lithuania, Macedonia, Montenegro, Romania, Russia, Serbia, Slovakia, Slovenia, Spain, Switzerland, Turkey, Ukraine.

== Description ==
Adults reach a length of about 5.1-7.8 mm. The body and legs are black. The upper surface is slightly shiny. The antennae are yellowish-brown with a dark club, or (rarely) entirely yellowish-brown. The hairs are either light or dark.

== Subspecies ==
- Omaloplia ruricola ruricola (Albania, Austria, Belarus, Belgium, Bosnia Herzegovina, Bulgaria, Crimea, Croatia, Czech Republic, France, Georgia, Germany, Great Britain, Greece, Hungary, Italy, Kosovo, Lithuania, Macedonia, Montenegro, Romania, Russia, Serbia, Slovakia, Slovenia, Spain, Switzerland, Turkey, Ukraine)
- Omaloplia ruricola nicolasi (Baraud, 1965) (Albania, France, Italy)
