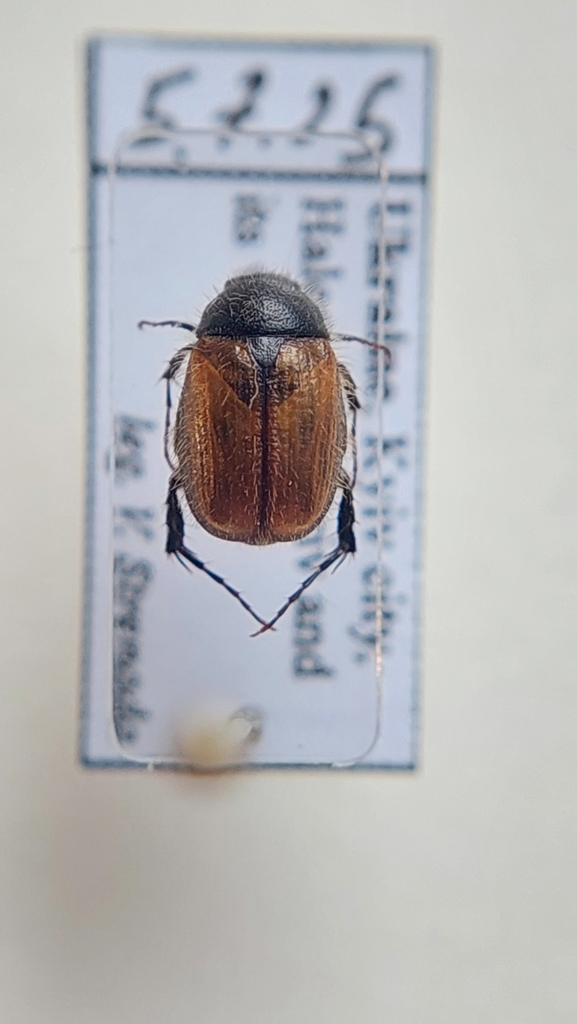

Scientific classification
- Kingdom: Animalia
- Phylum: Arthropoda
- Class: Insecta
- Order: Coleoptera
- Suborder: Polyphaga
- Infraorder: Scarabaeiformia
- Family: Scarabaeidae
- Genus: Omaloplia
- Species: O. nigromarginata

Binomial name
- Omaloplia nigromarginata (Herbst, 1786)

Synonyms
- Melolontha nigromarginata Herbst, 1786; Homaloplia alternata occidentalis Baraud, 1965

= Omaloplia nigromarginata =

Species of beetle

Omaloplia nigromarginata is a species of beetle of the family Scarabaeidae. It is found in Austria, Bulgaria, the Czech Republic, Denmark, France, Germany, Hungary, Latvia, Lithuania, Mongolia, Poland, Romania, Russia, Serbia, Siberia, Slovakia, Slovenia, Switzerland and Ukraine.

== Description ==
Adults reach a length of about 4.9–7.2 mm. The body and legs are black. The upper surface is slightly shiny. The antennae are yellowish-brown with a dark club. The hairs are yellowish.
