= Omaloplia vittata =

Scientific classification
- Kingdom: Animalia
- Phylum: Arthropoda
- Clade: Pancrustacea
- Class: Insecta
- Order: Coleoptera
- Suborder: Polyphaga
- Infraorder: Scarabaeiformia
- Family: Scarabaeidae
- Genus: Omaloplia
- Species: O. vittata

Binomial name
- Omaloplia vittata Guérin-Méneville, 1847

Species of beetle

Omaloplia vittata is a species of beetle of the family Scarabaeidae. It is found in Ethiopia and South Africa (KwaZulu-Natal).

== Description ==
Adults reach a length of about 6 mm. They have an oval, dull black body with a silky sheen. The head and thorax are finely punctured, with a few sparse black setae. The elytra are yellowish-white, with the sulcus, three longitudinal bars, and the outer margin black. The underside and legs are almost black.
