= Omaloplia irideomicans =

Scientific classification
- Kingdom: Animalia
- Phylum: Arthropoda
- Class: Insecta
- Order: Coleoptera
- Suborder: Polyphaga
- Infraorder: Scarabaeiformia
- Family: Scarabaeidae
- Genus: Omaloplia
- Species: O. irideomicans

Binomial name
- Omaloplia irideomicans (Fairmaire, 1884)

Synonyms
- Homaloplia irideomicans Fairmaire, 1884

Species of beetle

Omaloplia irideomicans is a species of beetle of the family Scarabaeidae. It is found in Somalia.

== Description ==
Adults reach a length of about 6 mm. They have an oval, convex, black, shiny body. The elytra with a slight iridescent sheen and with red hairs. The head is densely punctate.
