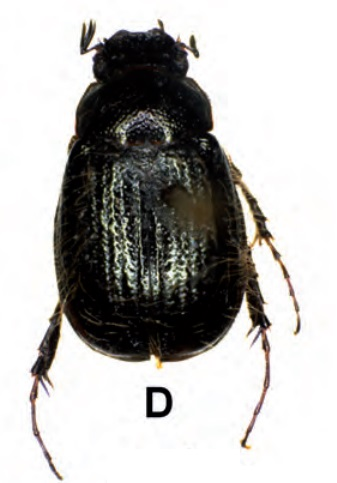

Scientific classification
- Kingdom: Animalia
- Phylum: Arthropoda
- Class: Insecta
- Order: Coleoptera
- Suborder: Polyphaga
- Infraorder: Scarabaeiformia
- Family: Scarabaeidae
- Genus: Archeohomaloplia
- Species: A. frolovi

Binomial name
- Archeohomaloplia frolovi Ahrens, 2011

= Archeohomaloplia frolovi =

Species of beetle

Archeohomaloplia frolovi is a species of beetle of the family Scarabaeidae. It is found in China (Sichuan).

== Description ==
Adults reach a length of about 5.1–5.4 mm. They have a black, oblong body. The antennae are black and the dorsal surface is shiny. The elytra is densely setose.

== Etymology ==
The species is named in honour of Andrey Frolov.
