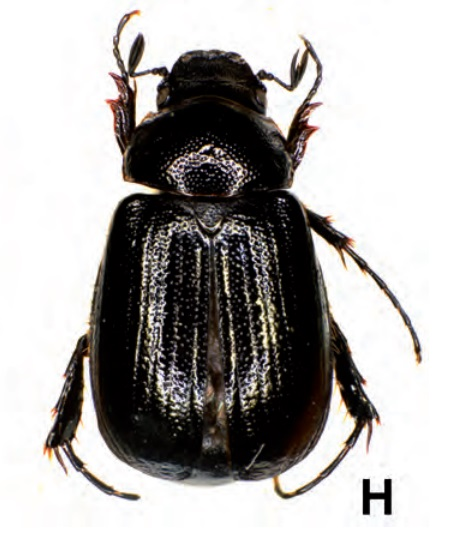

Scientific classification
- Kingdom: Animalia
- Phylum: Arthropoda
- Class: Insecta
- Order: Coleoptera
- Suborder: Polyphaga
- Infraorder: Scarabaeiformia
- Family: Scarabaeidae
- Genus: Archeohomaloplia
- Species: A. mingi

Binomial name
- Archeohomaloplia mingi Ahrens, 2011

= Archeohomaloplia mingi =

Species of beetle

Archeohomaloplia mingi is a species of beetle of the family Scarabaeidae. It is found in China (Sichuan).

== Description ==
Adults reach a length of about 5.4–6.3 mm. They have a black, oblong body. The antennae are black and the dorsal surface is shiny and almost glabrous.

== Etymology ==
The species is named after the Chinese scarab specialist Ming Bai.
