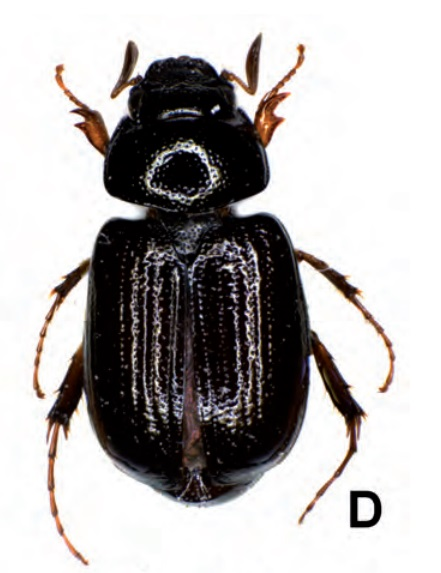

Scientific classification
- Kingdom: Animalia
- Phylum: Arthropoda
- Clade: Pancrustacea
- Class: Insecta
- Order: Coleoptera
- Suborder: Polyphaga
- Infraorder: Scarabaeiformia
- Family: Scarabaeidae
- Genus: Archeohomaloplia
- Species: A. taunggyiensis

Binomial name
- Archeohomaloplia taunggyiensis Ahrens, 2011

= Archeohomaloplia taunggyiensis =

Species of beetle

Archeohomaloplia taunggyiensis is a species of beetle of the family Scarabaeidae. It is found in Myanmar.

== Description ==
Adults reach a length of about 4.3–4.8 mm. They have a black, oblong body. The elytra are dark brown and the legs and antennae are yellowish-brown. The surface is shiny and almost glabrous.

== Etymology ==
The species name refers to its occurrence in Taunggyi.
