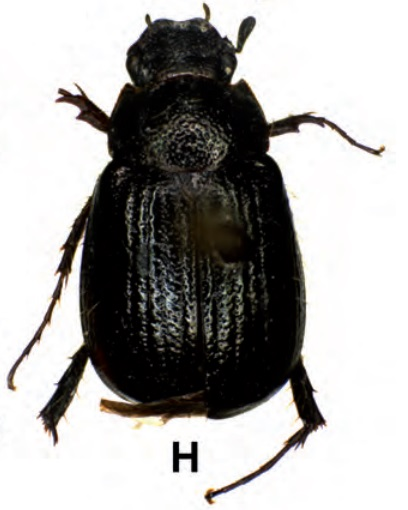

Scientific classification
- Kingdom: Animalia
- Phylum: Arthropoda
- Class: Insecta
- Order: Coleoptera
- Suborder: Polyphaga
- Infraorder: Scarabaeiformia
- Family: Scarabaeidae
- Genus: Archeohomaloplia
- Species: A. nikolajevi

Binomial name
- Archeohomaloplia nikolajevi Ahrens, 2011

= Archeohomaloplia nikolajevi =

Species of beetle

Archeohomaloplia nikolajevi is a species of beetle of the family Scarabaeidae. It is found in China (Sichuan).

== Description ==
Adults reach a length of about 5.2 mm. Its body us oblong and black, the antennae is black, and the dorsal surface is shiny. The elytra is densely setose.

== Etymology ==
The species is named in honour of Georgi Nikolajev, who revised the genus for first time.
