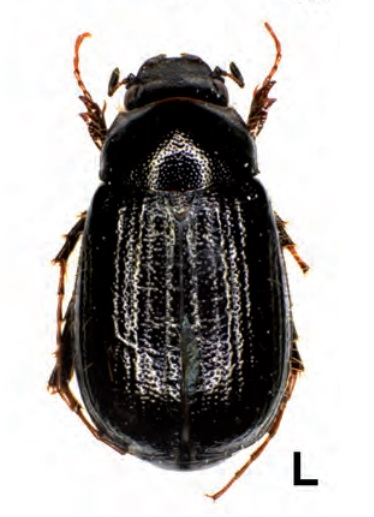

Scientific classification
- Kingdom: Animalia
- Phylum: Arthropoda
- Clade: Pancrustacea
- Class: Insecta
- Order: Coleoptera
- Suborder: Polyphaga
- Infraorder: Scarabaeiformia
- Family: Scarabaeidae
- Genus: Archeohomaloplia
- Species: A. safraneki

Binomial name
- Archeohomaloplia safraneki Ahrens, 2011

= Archeohomaloplia safraneki =

Species of beetle

Archeohomaloplia safraneki is a species of beetle of the family Scarabaeidae. It is found in China (Xizang).

== Description ==
Adults reach a length of about 6.1–6.3 mm. They have a black, oblong body. The antennae are brown and the tarsi are yellowish brown. The dorsal surface is shiny and almost glabrous.

== Etymology ==
The species is named after one of its collectors, Ondřej Šafránek.
