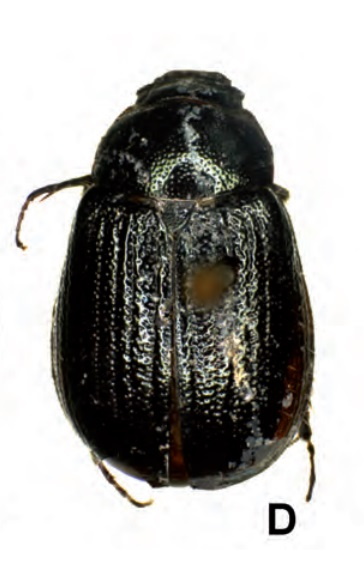

Scientific classification
- Kingdom: Animalia
- Phylum: Arthropoda
- Class: Insecta
- Order: Coleoptera
- Suborder: Polyphaga
- Infraorder: Scarabaeiformia
- Family: Scarabaeidae
- Genus: Archeohomaloplia
- Species: A. abbreviata

Binomial name
- Archeohomaloplia abbreviata (Fairmaire, 1897)

Synonyms
- Homaloplia abbreviata Fairmaire, 1897; Archeohomaloplia potanini Nikolajev, 1982

= Archeohomaloplia abbreviata =

Species of beetle

Archeohomaloplia abbreviata is a species of beetle of the family Scarabaeidae. It is found in China (Sichuan).

== Description ==
Adults reach a length of about 7.3 mm. They have a black, oblong body. The antennae are black, the dorsal surface is shiny and the elytra are very sparsely setose.
