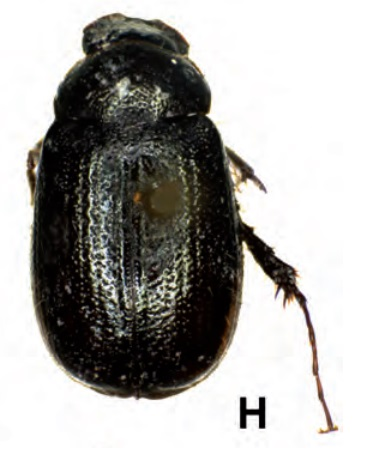

Scientific classification
- Kingdom: Animalia
- Phylum: Arthropoda
- Class: Insecta
- Order: Coleoptera
- Suborder: Polyphaga
- Infraorder: Scarabaeiformia
- Family: Scarabaeidae
- Genus: Archeohomaloplia
- Species: A. medvedevi

Binomial name
- Archeohomaloplia medvedevi Nikolajev, 1982

= Archeohomaloplia medvedevi =

Species of beetle

Archeohomaloplia medvedevi is a species of beetle of the family Scarabaeidae. It is found in China (Sichuan).

== Description ==
Adults reach a length of about 5.3 mm. They have a black, oblong body. The antennae are black, the dorsal surface is shiny and the elytra are very sparsely setose.
