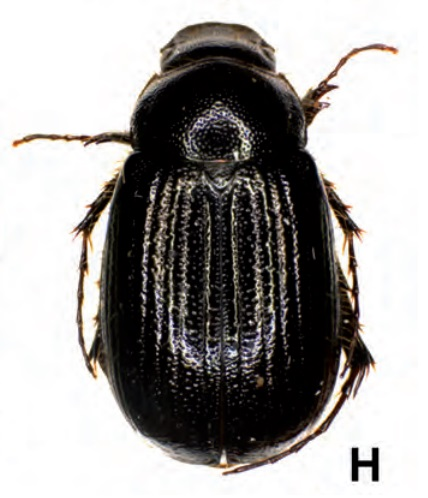

Scientific classification
- Kingdom: Animalia
- Phylum: Arthropoda
- Class: Insecta
- Order: Coleoptera
- Suborder: Polyphaga
- Infraorder: Scarabaeiformia
- Family: Scarabaeidae
- Genus: Archeohomaloplia
- Species: A. yunnana

Binomial name
- Archeohomaloplia yunnana (Miyake & Yamaya, 2001)

Synonyms
- Melanomaladera yunnana Miyake & Yamaya, 2001

= Archeohomaloplia yunnana =

Species of beetle

Archeohomaloplia yunnana is a species of beetle of the family Scarabaeidae. It is found in China (Yunnan).
