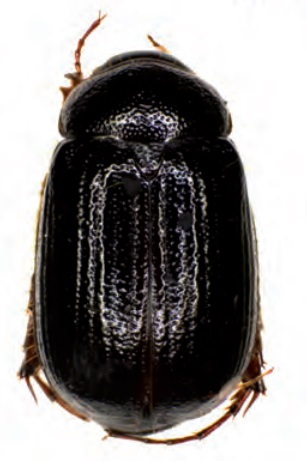

Scientific classification
- Kingdom: Animalia
- Phylum: Arthropoda
- Class: Insecta
- Order: Coleoptera
- Suborder: Polyphaga
- Infraorder: Scarabaeiformia
- Family: Scarabaeidae
- Genus: Archeohomaloplia
- Species: A. hebashana

Binomial name
- Archeohomaloplia hebashana Ahrens, 2011

= Archeohomaloplia hebashana =

Species of beetle

Archeohomaloplia hebashana is a species of beetle of the family Scarabaeidae. It is found in China (Yunnan).

== Description ==
Adults reach a length of about 5.1–5.3 mm. They have a black, oblong body. The antennae are black and the dorsal surface is shiny and almost glabrous.

== Etymology ==
The species name refers to its occurrence in the Heba Shan Mountains.
