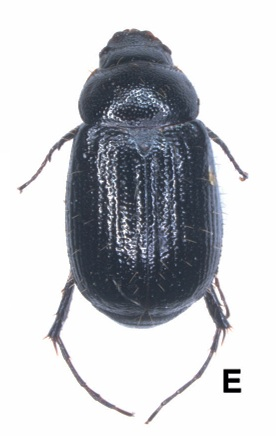

Scientific classification
- Kingdom: Animalia
- Phylum: Arthropoda
- Class: Insecta
- Order: Coleoptera
- Suborder: Polyphaga
- Infraorder: Scarabaeiformia
- Family: Scarabaeidae
- Genus: Archeohomaloplia
- Species: A. xiajuan

Binomial name
- Archeohomaloplia xiajuan Ahrens, 2023

= Archeohomaloplia xiajuan =

Species of beetle

Archeohomaloplia xiajuan is a species of beetle of the family Scarabaeidae. It is found in China (Yunnan).

== Description ==
Adults reach a length of about 4.9 mm. They have a black, oblong body. The antennae are black and the dorsal surface is shiny, with sparse and evenly spaced long, erect setae.

== Etymology ==
The species is named according to its occurrence near Xiajuan.
