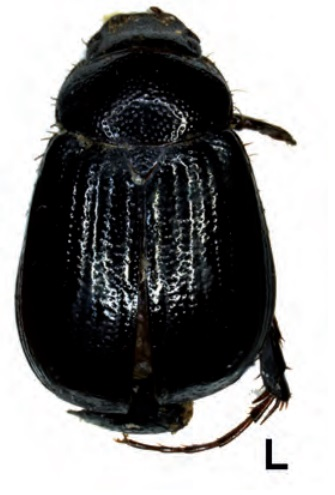

Scientific classification
- Kingdom: Animalia
- Phylum: Arthropoda
- Class: Insecta
- Order: Coleoptera
- Suborder: Polyphaga
- Infraorder: Scarabaeiformia
- Family: Scarabaeidae
- Genus: Archeohomaloplia
- Species: A. yaregongensis

Binomial name
- Archeohomaloplia yaregongensis Ahrens, 2011

= Archeohomaloplia yaregongensis =

Species of beetle

Archeohomaloplia yaregongensis is a species of beetle of the family Scarabaeidae. It is found in China (Xizang).

== Description ==
Adults reach a length of about 5–5.6 mm. They have a black, oblong body. The dorsal surface is shiny and almost glabrous.

== Etymology ==
The species is named after its type locality, Yarégong at the Tibetan-Sichuan border.
