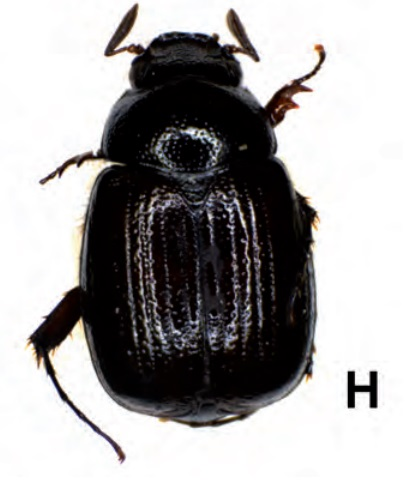

Scientific classification
- Kingdom: Animalia
- Phylum: Arthropoda
- Class: Insecta
- Order: Coleoptera
- Suborder: Polyphaga
- Infraorder: Scarabaeiformia
- Family: Scarabaeidae
- Genus: Archeohomaloplia
- Species: A. acuta

Binomial name
- Archeohomaloplia acuta Ahrens, 2011

= Archeohomaloplia acuta =

Species of beetle

Archeohomaloplia acuta is a species of beetle of the family Scarabaeidae. It is found in Myanmar.

== Description ==
Adults reach a length of about 4–4.2 mm. They have a black, oblong body. The elytra are dark brown and the legs and antennae are brown. The surface is shiny and almost glabrous.

== Etymology ==
The species name refers to the sharply pointed dorsal apophysis of the phallobasis.
