= Archeohomaloplia =

Scientific classification
- Kingdom: Animalia
- Phylum: Arthropoda
- Clade: Pancrustacea
- Class: Insecta
- Order: Coleoptera
- Suborder: Polyphaga
- Infraorder: Scarabaeiformia
- Family: Scarabaeidae
- Subfamily: Sericinae
- Tribe: Sericini
- Genus: Archeohomaloplia; Nikolajev, 1982

Synonyms
- Melanomaladera Miyake & Yamaya, 2001

Genus of leaf beetles

Archeohomaloplia is a genus of beetles belonging to the family Scarabaeidae.

== Species ==
- Archeohomaloplia abbreviata (Fairmaire, 1897)
- Archeohomaloplia acuta Ahrens, 2011
- Archeohomaloplia frolovi Ahrens, 2011
- Archeohomaloplia ganhaiziensis Ahrens, 2011
- Archeohomaloplia hebashana Ahrens, 2011
- Archeohomaloplia kalabi Ahrens, 2011
- Archeohomaloplia medvedevi Nikolajev, 1982
- Archeohomaloplia mingi Ahrens, 2011
- Archeohomaloplia nikolajevi Ahrens, 2011
- Archeohomaloplia safraneki Ahrens, 2011
- Archeohomaloplia taunggyiensis Ahrens, 2011
- Archeohomaloplia volkovitchi Ahrens, 2023
- Archeohomaloplia xiajuan Ahrens, 2023
- Archeohomaloplia yaregongensis Ahrens, 2011
- Archeohomaloplia yunnana (Miyake & Yamaya, 2001)
