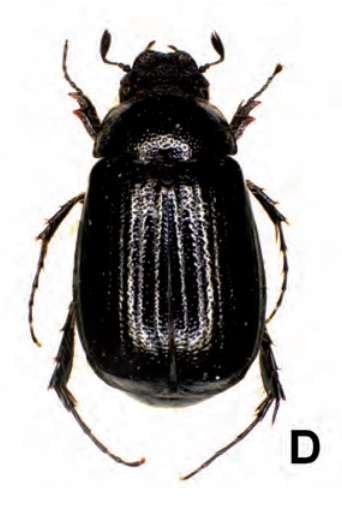

Scientific classification
- Kingdom: Animalia
- Phylum: Arthropoda
- Class: Insecta
- Order: Coleoptera
- Suborder: Polyphaga
- Infraorder: Scarabaeiformia
- Family: Scarabaeidae
- Genus: Archeohomaloplia
- Species: A. ganhaiziensis

Binomial name
- Archeohomaloplia ganhaiziensis Ahrens, 2011

= Archeohomaloplia ganhaiziensis =

Species of beetle

Archeohomaloplia ganhaiziensis is a species of beetle of the family Scarabaeidae. It is found in China (Yunnan).

== Description ==
Adults reach a length of about 5.8–6.6 mm. They have a black, oblong body. The dorsal surface is shiny and almost glabrous.

== Etymology ==
The species is named after its occurrence in the Ganhaizi pass.
