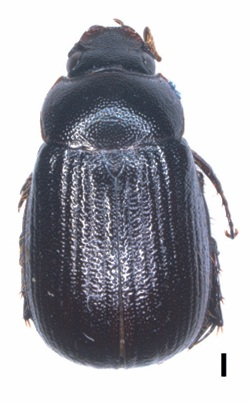

Scientific classification
- Kingdom: Animalia
- Phylum: Arthropoda
- Class: Insecta
- Order: Coleoptera
- Suborder: Polyphaga
- Infraorder: Scarabaeiformia
- Family: Scarabaeidae
- Genus: Archeohomaloplia
- Species: A. volkovitchi

Binomial name
- Archeohomaloplia volkovitchi Ahrens, 2023

= Archeohomaloplia volkovitchi =

Species of beetle

Archeohomaloplia volkovitchi is a species of beetle of the family Scarabaeidae. It is found in China (Yunnan).

== Description ==
Adults reach a length of about 5.9–6.1 mm. They have a black, oblong body. The antennae are black and the dorsal surface is shiny, with a few sparse short setae on the elytra, but otherwise glabrous.

== Etymology ==
The species is named in honour of its collector, V. Volkovitch.
