= Anomalophylla mawi =

Scientific classification
- Kingdom: Animalia
- Phylum: Arthropoda
- Class: Insecta
- Order: Coleoptera
- Suborder: Polyphaga
- Infraorder: Scarabaeiformia
- Family: Scarabaeidae
- Genus: Anomalophylla
- Species: A. mawi

Binomial name
- Anomalophylla mawi (Arrow, 1946)

Synonyms
- Microserica mawi Arrow, 1946

Species of beetle

Anomalophylla mawi is a species of beetle of the family Scarabaeidae. It is found in China (Sichuan).

== Description ==
Adults reach a length of about 5.2–5.7 mm. They have an oval body. The elytra and legs are reddish brown. The dorsal surface is dull, the head with a few erect setae, but the elytra almost glabrous. The hairs on the head, pronotum and elytra are yellow.
