= Anomalophylla huashanica =

Scientific classification
- Kingdom: Animalia
- Phylum: Arthropoda
- Class: Insecta
- Order: Coleoptera
- Suborder: Polyphaga
- Infraorder: Scarabaeiformia
- Family: Scarabaeidae
- Genus: Anomalophylla
- Species: A. huashanica

Binomial name
- Anomalophylla huashanica Ahrens, 2005

Species of beetle

Anomalophylla huashanica is a species of beetle of the family Scarabaeidae. It is found in China (Shaanxi, Shanxi, Sichuan).

== Description ==
Adults reach a length of about 5.4–6.7 mm. They have an oblong body. The legs are black and the elytra and one basomedial and two lateral spots on the pronotum are reddish brown. The dorsal surface is dull. There are long, dense, erect, brown setae on the head and pronotum. The hairs on the elytra are sparse and brown.

== Etymology ==
The species is named after the type locality, Hua Shan.
