= Anomalophylla tristicula =

Scientific classification
- Kingdom: Animalia
- Phylum: Arthropoda
- Class: Insecta
- Order: Coleoptera
- Suborder: Polyphaga
- Infraorder: Scarabaeiformia
- Family: Scarabaeidae
- Genus: Anomalophylla
- Species: A. tristicula

Binomial name
- Anomalophylla tristicula Reitter, 1887

Synonyms
- Anomalophylla moupinea unicolor Balthasar, 1932; Anomalophylla (Xorema) thibetana Reitter, 1902; Melaserica thibetana Brenske, 1898; Homaloplia discoidalis Fairmaire, 1897

Species of beetle

Anomalophylla tristicula is a species of beetle of the family Scarabaeidae. It is found in China (Gansu, Ningxia, Qinghai, Sichuan, Xizang, Yunnan) and Mongolia.

== Description ==
Adults reach a length of about 5.2–6.5 mm. They have a black, oblong body. The dorsal surface is dull with long, dense, erect setae. Most hairs are black, but the setae on the elytra and sometimes also those on the pronotum are white.
