= Anomalophylla kozlovi =

Scientific classification
- Kingdom: Animalia
- Phylum: Arthropoda
- Class: Insecta
- Order: Coleoptera
- Suborder: Polyphaga
- Infraorder: Scarabaeiformia
- Family: Scarabaeidae
- Genus: Anomalophylla
- Species: A. kozlovi

Binomial name
- Anomalophylla kozlovi Medvedev, 1952

Species of beetle

Anomalophylla kozlovi is a species of beetle of the family Scarabaeidae. It is found in China (Beijing, Ningxia).

== Description ==
Adults reach a length of about 4.8 mm. They have an oblong body. The legs are blackish brown, the pronotum is reddish brown and the elytra are yellowish with dark lateral borders. The dorsal surface is dull and there are brown hairs on the head, pronotum and elytra.
