= Anomalophylla hispidulosa =

Scientific classification
- Kingdom: Animalia
- Phylum: Arthropoda
- Class: Insecta
- Order: Coleoptera
- Suborder: Polyphaga
- Infraorder: Scarabaeiformia
- Family: Scarabaeidae
- Genus: Anomalophylla
- Species: A. hispidulosa

Binomial name
- Anomalophylla hispidulosa Ahrens, 2005

Species of beetle

Anomalophylla hispidulosa is a species of beetle of the family Scarabaeidae. It is found in China (Gansu).

== Description ==
Adults reach a length of about 4.7–7 mm. They have a black, oblong body. The dorsal surface is dull and has long, dense, erect setae. The hairs are black, but the setae on the elytra and sometimes those on the pronotum are white at the base.

== Etymology ==
The species name is derived from Latin hispidulosus (meaning setose).
