= Anomalophylla qinlingensis =

Scientific classification
- Kingdom: Animalia
- Phylum: Arthropoda
- Class: Insecta
- Order: Coleoptera
- Suborder: Polyphaga
- Infraorder: Scarabaeiformia
- Family: Scarabaeidae
- Genus: Anomalophylla
- Species: A. qinlingensis

Binomial name
- Anomalophylla qinlingensis Ahrens, 2005

Species of beetle

Anomalophylla qinlingensis is a species of beetle of the family Scarabaeidae. It is found in China (Shaanxi).

== Description ==
Adults reach a length of about 6.3 mm. They have an oblong body. The legs are black. The dorsal surface is dull, with long, dense, erect setae on the head and pronotum. The hairs on the elytra are sparse. All hairs are brown.

== Etymology ==
The species is named after the type locality, the Qinling mountains.
