= Anomalophylla bicolor =

Scientific classification
- Kingdom: Animalia
- Phylum: Arthropoda
- Class: Insecta
- Order: Coleoptera
- Suborder: Polyphaga
- Infraorder: Scarabaeiformia
- Family: Scarabaeidae
- Genus: Anomalophylla
- Species: A. bicolor

Binomial name
- Anomalophylla bicolor Ahrens, 2005

Synonyms
- Anomalophylla moupinea ab. bicolor Balthasar, 1932

Species of beetle

Anomalophylla bicolor is a species of beetle of the family Scarabaeidae. It is found in China (Sichuan).

== Description ==
Adults reach a length of about 5.5–5.8 mm. They have a black, oblong body. The elytra are reddish brown with dark borders. The dorsal surface is dull. The head and pronotum have long, dense, erect black setae, while the hairs on the elytra are dark yellow and moderately dense.
