= Anomalophylla subcarinata =

Scientific classification
- Kingdom: Animalia
- Phylum: Arthropoda
- Class: Insecta
- Order: Coleoptera
- Suborder: Polyphaga
- Infraorder: Scarabaeiformia
- Family: Scarabaeidae
- Genus: Anomalophylla
- Species: A. subcarinata

Binomial name
- Anomalophylla subcarinata Ahrens, 2005

Species of beetle

Anomalophylla subcarinata is a species of beetle of the family Scarabaeidae. It is found in China (Sichuan, Yunnan).

== Description ==
Adults reach a length of about 5.7–6.7 mm. They have a black, oblong body. The dorsal surface is dull with long, dense, erect setae. The hairs are mostly black, but the setae on the elytra and sometimes also on the pronotum are white.

== Etymology ==
The species name is derived from Latin sub (meaning fairly) and carinatus (meaning carinate).
