= Anomalophylla tsangpoana =

Scientific classification
- Kingdom: Animalia
- Phylum: Arthropoda
- Class: Insecta
- Order: Coleoptera
- Suborder: Polyphaga
- Infraorder: Scarabaeiformia
- Family: Scarabaeidae
- Genus: Anomalophylla
- Species: A. tsangpoana

Binomial name
- Anomalophylla tsangpoana Ahrens, 2005

Species of beetle

Anomalophylla tsangpoana is a species of beetle of the family Scarabaeidae. It is found in China (Xizang).

== Description ==
Adults reach a length of about 5.4–6.8 mm. They have a black, oblong body. The elytra are reddish brown with dark borders. The dorsal surface is dull with long, dense, erect setae.

== Etymology ==
The species is named after the Tsangpo River.
