= Anomalophylla kangdingensis =

Scientific classification
- Kingdom: Animalia
- Phylum: Arthropoda
- Class: Insecta
- Order: Coleoptera
- Suborder: Polyphaga
- Infraorder: Scarabaeiformia
- Family: Scarabaeidae
- Genus: Anomalophylla
- Species: A. kangdingensis

Binomial name
- Anomalophylla kangdingensis Ahrens, 2005

Species of beetle

Anomalophylla kangdingensis is a species of beetle of the family Scarabaeidae. It is found in China (Sichuan).

== Description ==
Adults reach a length of about 5.8 mm. They have an oblong body. The legs are black. The dorsal surface is dull, with long, dense, yellowish brown, erect setae on the head and pronotum.

== Etymology ==
The species name refers to its occurrence near to the city Kangding.
