= Anomalophylla liciata =

Scientific classification
- Kingdom: Animalia
- Phylum: Arthropoda
- Class: Insecta
- Order: Coleoptera
- Suborder: Polyphaga
- Infraorder: Scarabaeiformia
- Family: Scarabaeidae
- Genus: Anomalophylla
- Species: A. liciata

Binomial name
- Anomalophylla liciata Ahrens, 2005

Species of beetle

Anomalophylla liciata is a species of beetle of the family Scarabaeidae. It is found in China (Yunnan).

== Description ==
Adults reach a length of about 5–5.9 mm. They have a black, oblong body. The elytra are reddish brown with broadly black borders. The dorsal surface is dull and has long, dense, erect setae. The hairs on the head and anterior pronotum are black, and those on the base of the pronotum and elytra are dark yellow.

== Etymology ==
The species name is derived from Latin liciatus (meaning with stripes).
