= Anomalophylla wulingshanica =

Scientific classification
- Kingdom: Animalia
- Phylum: Arthropoda
- Class: Insecta
- Order: Coleoptera
- Suborder: Polyphaga
- Infraorder: Scarabaeiformia
- Family: Scarabaeidae
- Genus: Anomalophylla
- Species: A. wulingshanica

Binomial name
- Anomalophylla wulingshanica Ahrens, 2005

Species of beetle

Anomalophylla wulingshanica is a species of beetle of the family Scarabaeidae. It is found in China (Hunan).

== Description ==
Adults reach a length of about 5.2–7 mm. They have a black, oblong body. The dorsal surface is dull and there are long, dense, erect setae on the head and pronotum. The hairs on the elytra are sparse. All hairs are brown.

== Etymology ==
The species is named after the type locality, Wulingshan.
