= Anomalophylla mandhatensis =

Scientific classification
- Kingdom: Animalia
- Phylum: Arthropoda
- Class: Insecta
- Order: Coleoptera
- Suborder: Polyphaga
- Infraorder: Scarabaeiformia
- Family: Scarabaeidae
- Genus: Anomalophylla
- Species: A. mandhatensis

Binomial name
- Anomalophylla mandhatensis Ahrens, 2004

Species of beetle

Anomalophylla mandhatensis is a species of beetle of the family Scarabaeidae. It is found in Tibet.

== Description ==
Adults reach a length of about 5.1-6.4 mm. They have a black, oblong body, although the elytra are sometimes dark brown. The upper surface is mostly dull and loosely to densely haired, with long hairs.

== Etymology ==
The species is named for the type locality, Gurla Mandhata.
