= Anomalophylla ganhaiziensis =

Scientific classification
- Kingdom: Animalia
- Phylum: Arthropoda
- Class: Insecta
- Order: Coleoptera
- Suborder: Polyphaga
- Infraorder: Scarabaeiformia
- Family: Scarabaeidae
- Genus: Anomalophylla
- Species: A. ganhaiziensis

Binomial name
- Anomalophylla ganhaiziensis Ahrens, 2005

Species of beetle

Anomalophylla ganhaiziensis is a species of beetle of the family Scarabaeidae. It is found in China (Yunnan).

== Description ==
Adults reach a length of about 6.1 mm. They have a black, oblong body. The elytra are mostly dark brown, but the anterior one-third is reddish-brown. The dorsal surface is dull and there are long, dense, erect setae on the head and pronotum. The hairs on the elytra sparse. The hairs on the head and anterior pronotum are black, while those on the elytra are yellowish brown.

== Etymology ==
The species is named after the type locality, Ganhaizi.
