= Anomalophylla dongchuanensis =

Scientific classification
- Kingdom: Animalia
- Phylum: Arthropoda
- Class: Insecta
- Order: Coleoptera
- Suborder: Polyphaga
- Infraorder: Scarabaeiformia
- Family: Scarabaeidae
- Genus: Anomalophylla
- Species: A. dongchuanensis

Binomial name
- Anomalophylla dongchuanensis Ahrens, 2005

Species of beetle

Anomalophylla dongchuanensis is a species of beetle of the family Scarabaeidae. It is found in China (Yunnan).

== Description ==
Adults reach a length of about 4.3–6.7 mm. They have an oblong body. The dorsal surface and legs are brown, the antennae are yellow and the pronotum, apex of the elytra and ventral surface are black. The dorsal surface is dull with long, dense, erect setae on the head and pronotum. The hairs on the elytra sparse. The hairs on the head, pronotum and elytra are all yellow.

== Etymology ==
The species is named after the type locality, Dongchuan.
