= Anomalophylla majori =

Scientific classification
- Kingdom: Animalia
- Phylum: Arthropoda
- Class: Insecta
- Order: Coleoptera
- Suborder: Polyphaga
- Infraorder: Scarabaeiformia
- Family: Scarabaeidae
- Genus: Anomalophylla
- Species: A. majori

Binomial name
- Anomalophylla majori Ahrens, 2005

Species of beetle

Anomalophylla majori is a species of beetle of the family Scarabaeidae. It is found in China (Gansu).

== Description ==
Adults reach a length of about 5.3–5.6 mm. They have a black, oblong body. The elytra are indistinctly defined dark brown laterally. The dorsal surface is dull and has long, dense, erect setae. The hairs are mostly black, while the setae on the elytra and some on the pronotum are white at the base.

== Etymology ==
The species is named after the collector of the type series, V. Major.
