= Anomalophylla plagipennis =

Scientific classification
- Kingdom: Animalia
- Phylum: Arthropoda
- Class: Insecta
- Order: Coleoptera
- Suborder: Polyphaga
- Infraorder: Scarabaeiformia
- Family: Scarabaeidae
- Genus: Anomalophylla
- Species: A. plagipennis

Binomial name
- Anomalophylla plagipennis Ahrens, 2005

Species of beetle

Anomalophylla plagipennis is a species of beetle of the family Scarabaeidae. It is found in China (Yunnan).

== Description ==
Adults reach a length of about 4.8 mm. They have a black, oblong body. The legs and elytra are reddish brown, the latter with the apical half, sutural and lateral intervals black. The dorsal surface is dull, with long, dense, erect setae on the head and pronotum. The hairs on the elytra are moderately dense. All hairs are yellowish brown.

== Etymology ==
The species name is derived from Latin plaga (meaning stain) and penna (meaning wing).
