= Anomalophylla moupinea =

Scientific classification
- Kingdom: Animalia
- Phylum: Arthropoda
- Class: Insecta
- Order: Coleoptera
- Suborder: Polyphaga
- Infraorder: Scarabaeiformia
- Family: Scarabaeidae
- Genus: Anomalophylla
- Species: A. moupinea

Binomial name
- Anomalophylla moupinea Fairmaire, 1891

Species of beetle

Anomalophylla moupinea is a species of beetle of the family Scarabaeidae. It is found in China (Sichuan).

== Description ==
Adults reach a length of about 5.1 mm. They have a black, oblong body. The elytra are dark reddish brown. The dorsal surface is dull with long, dense, erect setae. The hairs are mostly black, but the setae on the elytra and sometimes also on the pronotum are white.
