= Anomalophylla =

Scientific classification
- Kingdom: Animalia
- Phylum: Arthropoda
- Clade: Pancrustacea
- Class: Insecta
- Order: Coleoptera
- Suborder: Polyphaga
- Infraorder: Scarabaeiformia
- Family: Scarabaeidae
- Subfamily: Sericinae
- Tribe: Sericini
- Genus: Anomalophylla; Reitter, 1887

Synonyms
- Melaserica Brenske, 1897; Xorema Reitter, 1901

Genus of leaf beetles

Anomalophylla is a genus of beetles belonging to the family Scarabaeidae.

== Species ==
- Anomalophylla bicolor Ahrens, 2005
- Anomalophylla dongchuanensis Ahrens, 2005
- Anomalophylla ganhaiziensis Ahrens, 2005
- Anomalophylla hispidulosa Ahrens, 2005
- Anomalophylla huashanica Ahrens, 2005
- Anomalophylla kangdingensis Ahrens, 2005
- Anomalophylla kozlovi Medvedev, 1952
- Anomalophylla liciata Ahrens, 2005
- Anomalophylla majori Ahrens, 2005
- Anomalophylla mandhatensis Ahrens, 2004
- Anomalophylla mawi (Arrow, 1946)
- Anomalophylla morula Ahrens, 2005
- Anomalophylla moupinea Fairmaire, 1891
- Anomalophylla moxiensis Ahrens, 2005
- Anomalophylla obscuripennis Ahrens, 2005
- Anomalophylla plagipennis Ahrens, 2005
- Anomalophylla qinlingensis Ahrens, 2005
- Anomalophylla stoetzneri Ahrens, 2005
- Anomalophylla subcarinata Ahrens, 2005
- Anomalophylla subfastuosa Ahrens, 2005
- Anomalophylla tristicula Reitter, 1887
- Anomalophylla tsangpoana Ahrens, 2005
- Anomalophylla vidua Ahrens, 2005
- Anomalophylla wulingshanica Ahrens, 2005
