= Anomalophylla moxiensis =

Scientific classification
- Kingdom: Animalia
- Phylum: Arthropoda
- Class: Insecta
- Order: Coleoptera
- Suborder: Polyphaga
- Infraorder: Scarabaeiformia
- Family: Scarabaeidae
- Genus: Anomalophylla
- Species: A. moxiensis

Binomial name
- Anomalophylla moxiensis Ahrens, 2005

Species of beetle

Anomalophylla moxiensis is a species of beetle of the family Scarabaeidae. It is found in China (Sichuan).

== Description ==
Adults reach a length of about 6.1–7.6 mm. They have a black, oblong body. The dorsal surface is dull, with long, dense, erect setae on the head and pronotum, while the hairs on the elytra are sparse. All hairs are brown.

== Etymology ==
The species is named after the type locality, Moxi.
