= Anomalophylla vidua =

Scientific classification
- Kingdom: Animalia
- Phylum: Arthropoda
- Class: Insecta
- Order: Coleoptera
- Suborder: Polyphaga
- Infraorder: Scarabaeiformia
- Family: Scarabaeidae
- Genus: Anomalophylla
- Species: A. vidua

Binomial name
- Anomalophylla vidua Ahrens, 2005

Species of beetle

Anomalophylla vidua is a species of beetle of the family Scarabaeidae. It is found in China (Sichuan).

== Description ==
Adults reach a length of about 5.4–7 mm. They have a black, oblong body. The dorsal surface is dull and has long, dense, erect setae. The hairs are mostly black, while the setae on the elytra and sometimes those on the posterior portion of the pronotum are white.

== Etymology ==
The species name is derived from Latin viduus (meaning single or solitary).
