= Anomalophylla stoetzneri =

Scientific classification
- Kingdom: Animalia
- Phylum: Arthropoda
- Class: Insecta
- Order: Coleoptera
- Suborder: Polyphaga
- Infraorder: Scarabaeiformia
- Family: Scarabaeidae
- Genus: Anomalophylla
- Species: A. stoetzneri

Binomial name
- Anomalophylla stoetzneri Ahrens, 2005

Species of beetle

Anomalophylla stoetzneri is a species of beetle of the family Scarabaeidae. It is found in China (Sichuan).

== Description ==
Adults reach a length of about 4.9 mm. They have a black, oblong body. The elytra are reddish brown with broadly black borders. The dorsal surface is dull and has long, dense, erect setae. The hairs on the head and anterior pronotum are black, and those on the posterior pronotum and elytra are dark yellow.

== Etymology ==
The species is named after Walter Stoetzner, who led the expedition during which the holotype was collected.
