= Raysymmela costaricensis =

Scientific classification
- Kingdom: Animalia
- Phylum: Arthropoda
- Clade: Pancrustacea
- Class: Insecta
- Order: Coleoptera
- Suborder: Polyphaga
- Infraorder: Scarabaeiformia
- Family: Scarabaeidae
- Genus: Raysymmela
- Species: R. costaricensis

Binomial name
- Raysymmela costaricensis (Moser, 1924)

Synonyms
- Symmela costaricensis Moser, 1924

Species of beetle

Raysymmela costaricensis is a species of beetle of the family Scarabaeidae. It is found in Costa Rica.

== Description ==
Adults reach a length of about 5.4 mm. The head is black and iridescent, with upright sparse setae. The labroclypeus has a rim of dense short setae behind the anterior margin. The antennal club is blackish. Both the pronotum and elytra are iridescent and black.
