= Raysymmela pallipes =

Scientific classification
- Kingdom: Animalia
- Phylum: Arthropoda
- Class: Insecta
- Order: Coleoptera
- Suborder: Polyphaga
- Infraorder: Scarabaeiformia
- Family: Scarabaeidae
- Genus: Raysymmela
- Species: R. pallipes

Binomial name
- Raysymmela pallipes (Blanchard, 1850)

Synonyms
- Symmela pallipes Blanchard, 1850; Symmela boliviensis Moser, 1919

Species of beetle

Raysymmela pallipes is a species of beetle of the family Scarabaeidae. It is found in Bolivia and Peru.

== Description ==
Adults reach a length of about 5.4 mm. The head is black and iridescent, with upright sparse setae. The labroclypeus has a rim of dense short setae behind anterior margin. The antennal club is blackish. The pronotum is iridescent, while the elytra are yellowish-brown with blackish margins.
