= Raysymmela curtula =

Scientific classification
- Kingdom: Animalia
- Phylum: Arthropoda
- Class: Insecta
- Order: Coleoptera
- Suborder: Polyphaga
- Infraorder: Scarabaeiformia
- Family: Scarabaeidae
- Genus: Raysymmela
- Species: R. curtula

Binomial name
- Raysymmela curtula (Erichson, 1835)

Synonyms
- Symmela curtula Erichson, 1835

Species of beetle

Raysymmela curtula is a species of beetle of the family Scarabaeidae. It is found in Brazil and Paraguay.

== Description ==
Adults reach a length of about 4.4 mm. The head is black and iridescent, with upright sparse setae. The antennal club is yellowish. The pronotum is shiny and black, while the elytra are yellowish-brown with blackish margins.
