= Raysymmela varians =

Scientific classification
- Kingdom: Animalia
- Phylum: Arthropoda
- Class: Insecta
- Order: Coleoptera
- Suborder: Polyphaga
- Infraorder: Scarabaeiformia
- Family: Scarabaeidae
- Genus: Raysymmela
- Species: R. varians

Binomial name
- Raysymmela varians (Erichson, 1847)

Synonyms
- Symmela varians Erichson, 1847

Species of beetle

Raysymmela varians is a species of beetle of the family Scarabaeidae. It is found in Peru.

== Description ==
Adults reach a length of about 5.2 mm. The head is black and iridescent, with upright sparse setae. The labroclypeus has a rim of dense short setae behind anterior margin. The antennal club is blackish. The pronotum is dull, iridescent and black, while the elytra are black.
