= Raysymmela seticollis =

Scientific classification
- Kingdom: Animalia
- Phylum: Arthropoda
- Clade: Pancrustacea
- Class: Insecta
- Order: Coleoptera
- Suborder: Polyphaga
- Infraorder: Scarabaeiformia
- Family: Scarabaeidae
- Genus: Raysymmela
- Species: R. seticollis

Binomial name
- Raysymmela seticollis (Moser, 1921)

Synonyms
- Symmela seticollis Moser, 1921

Species of beetle

Raysymmela seticollis is a species of beetle of the family Scarabaeidae. It is found in Brazil (Mato Grosso) and Paraguay.

== Description ==
Adults reach a length of about 4.9 mm. The head is black and iridescent, with upright sparse setae. The labroclypeus has a rim of dense short setae behind anterior margin. The antennal club is blackish. The pronotum is dull, iridescent and black, while the elytra are black with blackish margins.
