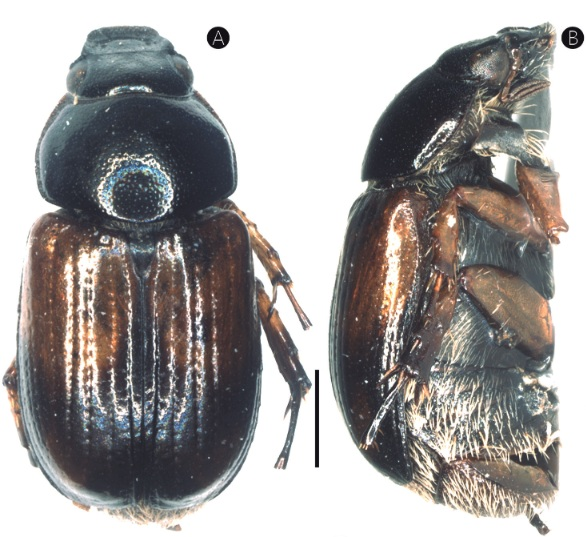

Scientific classification
- Kingdom: Animalia
- Phylum: Arthropoda
- Clade: Pancrustacea
- Class: Insecta
- Order: Coleoptera
- Suborder: Polyphaga
- Infraorder: Scarabaeiformia
- Family: Scarabaeidae
- Genus: Raysymmela
- Species: R. hajeki

Binomial name
- Raysymmela hajeki Pacheco & Ahrens, 2026

= Raysymmela hajeki =

Species of beetle

Raysymmela hajeki is a species of beetle of the family Scarabaeidae. It is found in Peru.

== Description ==
Adults reach a length of about 5–5.8 mm (0.20–0.23 in). The body is black and strongly shiny. The elytra are yellow, but darker brown in the apical half. The head and pronotum are without copper iridescent shine. The head is shiny and glabrous.

== Etymology ==
The species is dedicated to Jiří Hájek, beetle curator at NMPC.
