= Raysymmela erwini =

Scientific classification
- Kingdom: Animalia
- Phylum: Arthropoda
- Class: Insecta
- Order: Coleoptera
- Suborder: Polyphaga
- Infraorder: Scarabaeiformia
- Family: Scarabaeidae
- Genus: Raysymmela
- Species: R. erwini

Binomial name
- Raysymmela erwini Pacheco, Wipfler, Monné & Ahrens, 2022

Species of beetle

Raysymmela erwini is a species of beetle of the family Scarabaeidae. It is found in Bolivia.

== Description ==
Adults reach a length of about 4.2 mm. The head is black, dull and iridescent, with upright sparse setae. The labroclypeus has a rim of dense short setae behind anterior margin. The antennal club is blackish. The pronotum is iridescent and black, while the elytra are black with the posterior half dark.

== Etymology ==
The species is named after the entomologist Terry Erwin.
