= Raysymmela =

Scientific classification
- Kingdom: Animalia
- Phylum: Arthropoda
- Clade: Pancrustacea
- Class: Insecta
- Order: Coleoptera
- Suborder: Polyphaga
- Infraorder: Scarabaeiformia
- Family: Scarabaeidae
- Subfamily: Sericinae
- Tribe: Sericini
- Genus: Raysymmela; Saylor, 1947

Genus of leaf beetles

Raysymmela is a genus of beetles belonging to the family Scarabaeidae.

== Species ==
- Raysymmela bruchi (Moser, 1924)
- Raysymmela costaricensis (Moser, 1924)
- Raysymmela curtula (Erichson, 1835)
- Raysymmela equatorialis Pacheco, Wipfler, Monné & Ahrens, 2022
- Raysymmela erwini Pacheco, Wipfler, Monné & Ahrens, 2022
- Raysymmela hajeki Pacheco & Ahrens, 2026
- Raysymmela huanuca Saylor, 1947
- Raysymmela pallipes (Blanchard, 1850)
- Raysymmela seticollis (Moser, 1921)
- Raysymmela tarapoto Pacheco & Ahrens, 2026
- Raysymmela varians (Erichson, 1847)
