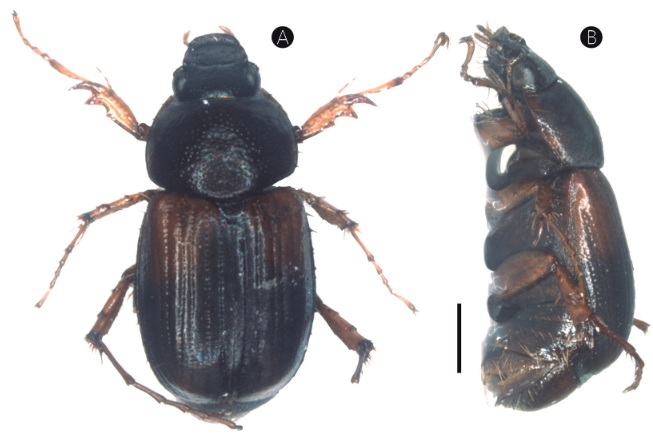

Scientific classification
- Kingdom: Animalia
- Phylum: Arthropoda
- Clade: Pancrustacea
- Class: Insecta
- Order: Coleoptera
- Suborder: Polyphaga
- Infraorder: Scarabaeiformia
- Family: Scarabaeidae
- Genus: Raysymmela
- Species: R. tarapoto

Binomial name
- Raysymmela tarapoto Pacheco & Ahrens, 2026

= Raysymmela tarapoto =

Species of beetle

Raysymmela tarapoto is a species of beetle of the family Scarabaeidae. It is found in Peru.

== Description ==
Adults reach a length of about 5.3–5.8 mm (0.21–0.23 in). The body is black and strongly shiny. The elytra are yellow, but darker brown in the apical half. The head and pronotum are without copper iridescent shine. The head is shiny and glabrous.

== Etymology ==
The species is named after its type locality, Tarapoto.
