= Raysymmela equatorialis =

Scientific classification
- Kingdom: Animalia
- Phylum: Arthropoda
- Class: Insecta
- Order: Coleoptera
- Suborder: Polyphaga
- Infraorder: Scarabaeiformia
- Family: Scarabaeidae
- Genus: Raysymmela
- Species: R. equatorialis

Binomial name
- Raysymmela equatorialis Pacheco, Wipfler, Monné & Ahrens, 2022

Species of beetle

Raysymmela equatorialis is a species of beetle of the family Scarabaeidae. It is found in Ecuador.

== Description ==
Adults reach a length of about 5.4–6.9 mm. The head is black and shiny, with upright sparse setae. The labroclypeus has a rim of dense short setae behind anterior margin. The antennal club is blackish. The pronotum is shiny and blackish-brown, while the elytra are yellowish-brown with blackish margins.

== Etymology ==
The species is named after the equatorial geographic position, close to Equator line.
