= Raysymmela bruchi =

Scientific classification
- Kingdom: Animalia
- Phylum: Arthropoda
- Clade: Pancrustacea
- Class: Insecta
- Order: Coleoptera
- Suborder: Polyphaga
- Infraorder: Scarabaeiformia
- Family: Scarabaeidae
- Genus: Raysymmela
- Species: R. bruchi

Binomial name
- Raysymmela bruchi (Moser, 1924)

Synonyms
- Symmela bruchi Moser, 1924

Species of beetle

Raysymmela bruchi is a species of beetle of the family Scarabaeidae. It is found in Argentina and Bolivia.

== Description ==
Adults reach a length of about 5.2 mm. The head is black and shiny, with upright sparse setae. The labroclypeus has a rim of dense short setae behind the anterior margin. The antennal club is blackish. The elytra are mostly reddish-brown, but the posterior half is dark.
