= Raysymmela huanuca =

Scientific classification
- Kingdom: Animalia
- Phylum: Arthropoda
- Class: Insecta
- Order: Coleoptera
- Suborder: Polyphaga
- Infraorder: Scarabaeiformia
- Family: Scarabaeidae
- Genus: Raysymmela
- Species: R. huanuca

Binomial name
- Raysymmela huanuca Saylor, 1947

Species of beetle

Raysymmela huanuca is a species of beetle of the family Scarabaeidae. It is found in Peru.

== Description ==
Adults reach a length of about 5.1 mm. The head is black and iridescent, with upright sparse setae. The labroclypeus has a rim of dense short setae behind anterior margin. The antennal club is blackish. The pronotum is iridescent and blackish-brown, while the elytra are yellowish-brown with blackish margins.
