= Doxocalia superba =

Scientific classification
- Kingdom: Animalia
- Phylum: Arthropoda
- Clade: Pancrustacea
- Class: Insecta
- Order: Coleoptera
- Suborder: Polyphaga
- Infraorder: Scarabaeiformia
- Family: Scarabaeidae
- Genus: Doxocalia
- Species: D. superba

Binomial name
- Doxocalia superba Brenske, 1901

Species of beetle

Doxocalia superba is a species of beetle of the family Scarabaeidae. It is found in Gabon, the Democratic Republic of the Congo and the Republic of the Congo.

== Description ==
Adults reach a length of about 8.5 mm. They are reddish-brown underneath and dull greenish above with variegated stripes reminiscent of the markings of Bilga species. The frons is finely punctured, with a few weak bristle-like punctures on the vertex. The pronotum is densely and finely punctate with tiny hairs. The scutellum is very broad at the base, with an almost heart-shaped, rounded, smooth apex, densely punctate. The elytra have only fine rows of punctures, which border the alternately raised intervals. Sutures 2, 4, and 6 are more raised and lighter, with yellow spots. Sutures 1, 3, 5, and 7 are darker with yellow, rounded spots, which form almost four transverse rows. The apex is a blurred yellowish color.
