= Bilga kameruna =

Scientific classification
- Kingdom: Animalia
- Phylum: Arthropoda
- Class: Insecta
- Order: Coleoptera
- Suborder: Polyphaga
- Infraorder: Scarabaeiformia
- Family: Scarabaeidae
- Genus: Bilga
- Species: B. kameruna

Binomial name
- Bilga kameruna Brenske, 1901

Species of beetle

Bilga kameruna is a species of beetle of the family Scarabaeidae. It is found in Cameroon.

== Description ==
Adults reach a length of about 10 mm. They are similar to Bilga ficosa. The setae on the anterior margin of the clypeus are coarse and the pronotal bulge at the lateral margin is somewhat angular.
