= Bilga conradti =

Scientific classification
- Kingdom: Animalia
- Phylum: Arthropoda
- Class: Insecta
- Order: Coleoptera
- Suborder: Polyphaga
- Infraorder: Scarabaeiformia
- Family: Scarabaeidae
- Genus: Bilga
- Species: B. conradti

Binomial name
- Bilga conradti Brenske, 1901

Species of beetle

Bilga conradti is a species of beetle of the family Scarabaeidae. It is found in Cameroon.

== Description ==
Adults reach a length of about 8.5 mm. They are dull and brownish-green. They are similar to Bilga pictipennis, but with slightly fewer yellow spots at the base of the elytra and with slightly wider smooth and narrower variegated stripes.
