= Doxocalia tenuipes =

Scientific classification
- Kingdom: Animalia
- Phylum: Arthropoda
- Clade: Pancrustacea
- Class: Insecta
- Order: Coleoptera
- Suborder: Polyphaga
- Infraorder: Scarabaeiformia
- Family: Scarabaeidae
- Genus: Doxocalia
- Species: D. tenuipes

Binomial name
- Doxocalia tenuipes Moser, 1917

Species of beetle

Doxocalia tenuipes is a species of beetle of the family Scarabaeidae. It is found in Angola.

== Description ==
Adults reach a length of about 10 mm. They are dull and black above with rust-colored spots. The underside is blackish-brown, while the middle of the thorax and the legs are brown. The head is black and the frons is quite widely covered with short-bristled punctures. The antennae are brown. The pronotum is black, and indistinctly brown-spotted at the sides. The punctures are irregularly spaced and minutely punctured, setate, and a central spot is puncture-free. The scutellum is punctured except for the middle and tip. The elytra are black and brown-spotted. They have regular rows of punctures and the weakly convex intervals are only very sparsely punctured. All punctures have short setae.
