= Bilga tomeensis =

Scientific classification
- Kingdom: Animalia
- Phylum: Arthropoda
- Class: Insecta
- Order: Coleoptera
- Suborder: Polyphaga
- Infraorder: Scarabaeiformia
- Family: Scarabaeidae
- Genus: Bilga
- Species: B. tomeensis

Binomial name
- Bilga tomeensis Lacroix, Coache & Filippi, 2023

Species of beetle

Bilga tomeensis is a species of beetle of the family Scarabaeidae. It is found in São Tomé and Príncipe.

== Description ==
Adults reach a length of about 9 mm. The upper surface is dull, velvety and blackish-brown with numerous large yellow spots on the elytra.

== Etymology ==
The species name refers to its occurrence in Sao Tomé & Principe.
