= Doxocalia katangensis =

Scientific classification
- Kingdom: Animalia
- Phylum: Arthropoda
- Clade: Pancrustacea
- Class: Insecta
- Order: Coleoptera
- Suborder: Polyphaga
- Infraorder: Scarabaeiformia
- Family: Scarabaeidae
- Genus: Doxocalia
- Species: D. katangensis

Binomial name
- Doxocalia katangensis Burgeon, 1942

Species of beetle

Doxocalia katangensis is a species of beetle of the family Scarabaeidae. It is found in the Democratic Republic of the Congo and Gabon.
