= Bilga ficosa =

Scientific classification
- Kingdom: Animalia
- Phylum: Arthropoda
- Class: Insecta
- Order: Coleoptera
- Suborder: Polyphaga
- Infraorder: Scarabaeiformia
- Family: Scarabaeidae
- Genus: Bilga
- Species: B. ficosa

Binomial name
- Bilga ficosa Brenske, 1901

Species of beetle

Bilga ficosa is a species of beetle of the family Scarabaeidae. It is found in the Republic of the Congo.

== Description ==
Adults reach a length of about 10 mm. They are similar to Bilga togoana, but the pygidium and segments are without red spots.
