= Doxocalia =

Scientific classification
- Kingdom: Animalia
- Phylum: Arthropoda
- Clade: Pancrustacea
- Class: Insecta
- Order: Coleoptera
- Suborder: Polyphaga
- Infraorder: Scarabaeiformia
- Family: Scarabaeidae
- Subfamily: Sericinae
- Tribe: Sericini
- Genus: Doxocalia; Brenske, 1897

Genus of leaf beetles

Doxocalia is a genus of beetles belonging to the family Scarabaeidae.

== Species ==
- Doxocalia katangensis Burgeon, 1942
- Doxocalia kivuensis Burgeon, 1942
- Doxocalia superba Brenske, 1901
- Doxocalia tenuipes Moser, 1917
