= Bilga rufomaculata =

Scientific classification
- Kingdom: Animalia
- Phylum: Arthropoda
- Class: Insecta
- Order: Coleoptera
- Suborder: Polyphaga
- Infraorder: Scarabaeiformia
- Family: Scarabaeidae
- Genus: Bilga
- Species: B. rufomaculata

Binomial name
- Bilga rufomaculata Brenske, 1901

Species of beetle

Bilga rufomaculata is a species of beetle of the family Scarabaeidae. It is found in Gabon.

== Description ==
Adults reach a length of about 10 mm. They have faintly red-spotted sides and the punctation on the hind coxae and thorax is coarser and more widespread than in related species.
