= Bilga togoana =

Scientific classification
- Kingdom: Animalia
- Phylum: Arthropoda
- Class: Insecta
- Order: Coleoptera
- Suborder: Polyphaga
- Infraorder: Scarabaeiformia
- Family: Scarabaeidae
- Genus: Bilga
- Species: B. togoana

Binomial name
- Bilga togoana Brenske, 1901

Species of beetle

Bilga togoana is a species of beetle of the family Scarabaeidae. It is found in Togo.

== Description ==
Adults reach a length of about 10-10.5 mm. The sides of the abdominal segments are red-spotted and the pygidium has two red spots. The fifth interval on the elytra is spotted.
