= Bilga pictipennis =

Scientific classification
- Kingdom: Animalia
- Phylum: Arthropoda
- Class: Insecta
- Order: Coleoptera
- Suborder: Polyphaga
- Infraorder: Scarabaeiformia
- Family: Scarabaeidae
- Genus: Bilga
- Species: B. pictipennis

Binomial name
- Bilga pictipennis Fairmaire, 1893

Species of beetle

Bilga pictipennis is a species of beetle of the family Scarabaeidae. It is found in the Democratic Republic of the Congo and the Republic of the Congo.

== Description ==
Adults reach a length of about 8–9 mm. The frons and vertex are dull, brownish-greenish and very finely punctate with microscopically tiny hairs in the punctures. The pronotum is dull, brownish-greenish, deeply emarginate at the anterior margin, with pointed, angularly projecting anterior angles. From these, the sides initially run outwards in a straight line, then with a slight curve to the finely rounded posterior angles. The lateral margin is finely bordered, in the anterior part distinctly depressed with tiny hairs in the densely spaced punctures there, but without marginal setae. The surface is convex, flat and broadly impressed in front of the posterior angles, finely and widely punctate with tiny hairs. The elytra are quite peculiarly striped. The suture, the 2nd, 4th, and 6th spaces, as well as the 8th and 9th spaces next to the margin, are solid greenish-brown, distinctly convex, without punctures. The 1st, 3rd, 5th, and 7th spaces are yellowish-red with elongated, black, velvety spots of varying lengths. This pattern is irregular and differs between specimens.
