= Bilga (beetle) =

Scientific classification
- Kingdom: Animalia
- Phylum: Arthropoda
- Class: Insecta
- Order: Coleoptera
- Suborder: Polyphaga
- Infraorder: Scarabaeiformia
- Family: Scarabaeidae
- Subfamily: Sericinae
- Tribe: Sericini
- Genus: Bilga; Fairmaire, 1893

Genus of leaf beetles

Bilga is a genus of beetles belonging to the family Scarabaeidae.

== Species ==
- Bilga conradti Brenske, 1901
- Bilga ficosa Brenske, 1901
- Bilga kameruna Brenske, 1901
- Bilga pictipennis Fairmaire, 1893
- Bilga rufomaculata Brenske, 1901
- Bilga togoana Brenske, 1901
- Bilga tomeensis Lacroix, Coache & Filippi, 2023
