= Parautoserica =

Scientific classification
- Kingdom: Animalia
- Phylum: Arthropoda
- Class: Insecta
- Order: Coleoptera
- Suborder: Polyphaga
- Infraorder: Scarabaeiformia
- Family: Scarabaeidae
- Subfamily: Sericinae
- Tribe: Sericini
- Genus: Parautoserica; Lacroix, Coache & Filippi, 2022

Genus of leaf beetles

Parautoserica is a genus of beetles belonging to the family Scarabaeidae.

== Species ==
- Parautoserica barclayi Lacroix, Coache & Filippi, 2023
- Parautoserica deffontainesi Lacroix, Coache & Filippi, 2023
- Parautoserica deschampsi Lacroix, Coache & Filippi, 2022
- Parautoserica louisae Lacroix, Coache & Filippi, 2023
- Parautoserica martinsae Lacroix, Coache & Filippi, 2023
- Parautoserica mendesi Lacroix, Coache & Filippi, 2022
- Parautoserica monteironi Lacroix, Coache & Filippi, 2023
- Parautoserica smithi Lacroix, Coache & Filippi, 2023
- Parautoserica turneri Lacroix, Coache & Filippi, 2023
