= Parautoserica barclayi =

Scientific classification
- Kingdom: Animalia
- Phylum: Arthropoda
- Class: Insecta
- Order: Coleoptera
- Suborder: Polyphaga
- Infraorder: Scarabaeiformia
- Family: Scarabaeidae
- Genus: Parautoserica
- Species: P. barclayi

Binomial name
- Parautoserica barclayi Lacroix, Coache & Filippi, 2023

Species of beetle

Parautoserica barclayi is a species of beetle of the family Scarabaeidae. It is found in São Tomé and Príncipe.

== Description ==
Adults reach a length of about 8 mm. They have a short, oval body. The upper surface is reddish-brown without spots and with very fine hairs.

== Etymology ==
The species is named after Max Barclay.
