= Parautoserica deschampsi =

Scientific classification
- Kingdom: Animalia
- Phylum: Arthropoda
- Class: Insecta
- Order: Coleoptera
- Suborder: Polyphaga
- Infraorder: Scarabaeiformia
- Family: Scarabaeidae
- Genus: Parautoserica
- Species: P. deschampsi

Binomial name
- Parautoserica deschampsi Lacroix, Coache & Filippi, 2022

Species of beetle

Parautoserica deschampsi is a species of beetle of the family Scarabaeidae. It is found in São Tomé and Príncipe.

== Description ==
Adults reach a length of about 7.2 mm. They have a slightly elongated, rather oval body. The upper surface is dull and light brown, with darker spots on the elytra. The appendages are orange-yellow and shiny.

== Etymology ==
The species is named after Pascal Deschamps.
