= Parautoserica mendesi =

Scientific classification
- Kingdom: Animalia
- Phylum: Arthropoda
- Class: Insecta
- Order: Coleoptera
- Suborder: Polyphaga
- Infraorder: Scarabaeiformia
- Family: Scarabaeidae
- Genus: Parautoserica
- Species: P. mendesi

Binomial name
- Parautoserica mendesi Lacroix, Coache & Filippi, 2022

Species of beetle

Parautoserica mendesi is a species of beetle of the family Scarabaeidae. It is found in São Tomé and Príncipe.

== Description ==
Adults reach a length of about 10.2 mm. They have a short body. The upper surface is dull and dark brown, with numerous, large blackish spots. The appendages are light brown.

== Etymology ==
The species is named after Mr. José Luis Xavier Mendes.
