= Parautoserica deffontainesi =

Scientific classification
- Kingdom: Animalia
- Phylum: Arthropoda
- Class: Insecta
- Order: Coleoptera
- Suborder: Polyphaga
- Infraorder: Scarabaeiformia
- Family: Scarabaeidae
- Genus: Parautoserica
- Species: P. deffontainesi

Binomial name
- Parautoserica deffontainesi Lacroix, Coache & Filippi, 2023

Species of beetle

Parautoserica deffontainesi is a species of beetle of the family Scarabaeidae. It is found in São Tomé and Príncipe.

== Description ==
Adults reach a length of about 7 mm. The upper surface is dark reddish-brown.

== Etymology ==
The species is named after Jean Baptiste Deffontaines.
