= Allokotarsa clypeata =

Scientific classification
- Kingdom: Animalia
- Phylum: Arthropoda
- Clade: Pancrustacea
- Class: Insecta
- Order: Coleoptera
- Suborder: Polyphaga
- Infraorder: Scarabaeiformia
- Family: Scarabaeidae
- Genus: Allokotarsa
- Species: A. clypeata

Binomial name
- Allokotarsa clypeata Péringuey, 1904

Species of beetle

Allokotarsa clypeata is a species of beetle of the family Scarabaeidae. It is found in Namibia.

== Description ==
Adults reach a length of about 5.25–6.5 mm. They are very similar to Allokotarsa rotundicollis. The colour is the same, but the head is not infuscate and the clypeus is more declivous. In the anterior part, the lateral angles of the anterior margin are as sharp as the median aculeate part, which is not the case in A. rotundicollis, and the prothorax, which is also more closely punctured, is slightly yet plainly attenuate laterally in the anterior, but not at all in the posterior part the basal angles of which are quite distinct, although not sharp, while in A. rotwndicollis, the basal angles are conspicuously broadly rounded. The shape and sculpture of the elytra are similar in both species.
