= Allokotarsa =

Scientific classification
- Kingdom: Animalia
- Phylum: Arthropoda
- Clade: Pancrustacea
- Class: Insecta
- Order: Coleoptera
- Suborder: Polyphaga
- Infraorder: Scarabaeiformia
- Family: Scarabaeidae
- Subfamily: Sericinae
- Tribe: Sericini
- Genus: Allokotarsa; Péringuey, 1904

Synonyms
- Arraphytarsa Péringuey 1904

Genus of leaf beetles

Allokotarsa is a genus of beetles belonging to the family Scarabaeidae.

== Species ==
- Allokotarsa clypeata Péringuey, 1904
- Allokotarsa damarina (Péringuey, 1904)
- Allokotarsa griqua Arrow, 1925
- Allokotarsa nigriceps Moser, 1924
- Allokotarsa rotundicollis Péringuey, 1904
