= Allokotarsa damarina =

Scientific classification
- Kingdom: Animalia
- Phylum: Arthropoda
- Clade: Pancrustacea
- Class: Insecta
- Order: Coleoptera
- Suborder: Polyphaga
- Infraorder: Scarabaeiformia
- Family: Scarabaeidae
- Genus: Allokotarsa
- Species: A. damarina

Binomial name
- Allokotarsa damarina (Péringuey, 1904)

Synonyms
- Arraphytarsa damarina Péringuey, 1904; Arrhaphytarsa kadleci Frey, 1969

Species of beetle

Allokotarsa damarina is a species of beetle of the family Scarabaeidae. It is found in Namibia.

== Description ==
Adults reach a length of about 6 mm. The upper and lower surfaces are dark yellow, with the tibiae somewhat darker. The sides of the pronotum and elytra, as well as the first antennal segment, all have pale cilia. The pronotum is densely and evenly punctate and there are spotted bands on the elytra.
