= Allokotarsa nigriceps =

Scientific classification
- Kingdom: Animalia
- Phylum: Arthropoda
- Clade: Pancrustacea
- Class: Insecta
- Order: Coleoptera
- Suborder: Polyphaga
- Infraorder: Scarabaeiformia
- Family: Scarabaeidae
- Genus: Allokotarsa
- Species: A. nigriceps

Binomial name
- Allokotarsa nigriceps Moser, 1924

Species of beetle

Allokotarsa nigriceps is a species of beetle of the family Scarabaeidae. It is found in Tanzania.

== Description ==
Adults reach a length of about 4.5 mm. They are yellow and shiny, with a black head. The antennae are yellow.
