= Allokotarsa rotundicollis =

Scientific classification
- Kingdom: Animalia
- Phylum: Arthropoda
- Clade: Pancrustacea
- Class: Insecta
- Order: Coleoptera
- Suborder: Polyphaga
- Infraorder: Scarabaeiformia
- Family: Scarabaeidae
- Genus: Allokotarsa
- Species: A. rotundicollis

Binomial name
- Allokotarsa rotundicollis Péringuey, 1904

Species of beetle

Allokotarsa rotundicollis is a species of beetle of the family Scarabaeidae. It is found in Namibia, South Africa (Northern Cape) and Zimbabwe.

== Description ==
Adults reach a length of about 5–6 mm. They are pale testaceous, sometimes light brick-red. The head is usually darker than the body and very often black. The club of the antennae is flavous.
