= Lepidoserica polyphylla =

Scientific classification
- Kingdom: Animalia
- Phylum: Arthropoda
- Class: Insecta
- Order: Coleoptera
- Suborder: Polyphaga
- Infraorder: Scarabaeiformia
- Family: Scarabaeidae
- Genus: Lepidoserica
- Species: L. polyphylla

Binomial name
- Lepidoserica polyphylla (Moser, 1920)

Synonyms
- Pachyserica polyphylla Moser, 1920

Species of beetle

Lepidoserica polyphylla is a species of beetle of the family Scarabaeidae. It is found in India (Assam, Khasi Hills).

== Description ==
Adults reach a length of about 8.6-9.9 mm. They have a dark brown, elongate-oval body. The antennae, legs and underside are yellowish with some dark brown parts. The upperside is dull, the head, pronotum and elytra with a greenish sheen, the upperside is also somewhat hairy, with some isolated white scales.
