= Lepidoserica =

Scientific classification
- Kingdom: Animalia
- Phylum: Arthropoda
- Class: Insecta
- Order: Coleoptera
- Suborder: Polyphaga
- Infraorder: Scarabaeiformia
- Family: Scarabaeidae
- Subfamily: Sericinae
- Tribe: Sericini
- Genus: Lepidoserica; Nikolaev, 1979

Genus of leaf beetles

Lepidoserica is a genus of beetles belonging to the family Scarabaeidae.

== Species ==
- Lepidoserica barapaniensis Chandra, Ahrens, Bhunia, Sreedevi & Gupta, 2021
- Lepidoserica maculifera (Brenske, 1894)
- Lepidoserica polyphylla (Moser, 1920)
