= Lepidoserica barapaniensis =

Scientific classification
- Kingdom: Animalia
- Phylum: Arthropoda
- Class: Insecta
- Order: Coleoptera
- Suborder: Polyphaga
- Infraorder: Scarabaeiformia
- Family: Scarabaeidae
- Genus: Lepidoserica
- Species: L. barapaniensis

Binomial name
- Lepidoserica barapaniensis Chandra, Ahrens, Bhunia, Sreedevi & Gupta, 2021

Species of beetle

Lepidoserica barapaniensis is a species of beetle of the family Scarabaeidae. It is found in India (Meghalaya).

== Description ==
Adults reach a length of about 8.3 mm. They have a yellowish-brown, shiny, oblong body. The dorsal surface has dense darker spots of different sizes. The dark spots and dark frons have some greenish shine. The antennae are yellow. The dorsal surface is sparsely setose, with fine minute and white scales on the elytra and pronotum.

== Etymology ==
The species is named after its type locality, Barapani.
