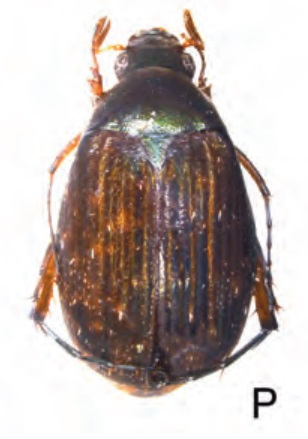

Scientific classification
- Kingdom: Animalia
- Phylum: Arthropoda
- Class: Insecta
- Order: Coleoptera
- Suborder: Polyphaga
- Infraorder: Scarabaeiformia
- Family: Scarabaeidae
- Genus: Lepidoserica
- Species: L. maculifera

Binomial name
- Lepidoserica maculifera (Brenske, 1894)

Synonyms
- Serica maculifera Brenske, 1894

= Lepidoserica maculifera =

Species of beetle

Lepidoserica maculifera is a species of beetle of the family Scarabaeidae. It is found in India (Meghalaya).

== Description ==
Adults reach a length of about 8.3-8.7 mm. They have a dark brown, elongate-oval body. The antennae, legs and underside are yellowish with some dark brown parts. The upperside is dull, the head and pronotum with a greenish sheen, the upperside is also somewhat hairy, with some isolated white scales.
