= Tamnoserica lucidula =

Scientific classification
- Kingdom: Animalia
- Phylum: Arthropoda
- Clade: Pancrustacea
- Class: Insecta
- Order: Coleoptera
- Suborder: Polyphaga
- Infraorder: Scarabaeiformia
- Family: Scarabaeidae
- Genus: Tamnoserica
- Species: T. lucidula

Binomial name
- Tamnoserica lucidula (Blanchard, 1850)

Synonyms
- Emphania lucidula Blanchard, 1850

Species of beetle

Tamnoserica lucidula is a species of beetle of the family Scarabaeidae. It is found in Madagascar.

== Description ==
Adults reach a length of about 3.5 mm. They are very similar to Tamnoserica mutans. They are reddish-cuprous and shiny, with a punctate head and red antennae with a black club. The pronotum is broad, punctate, smooth and shiny. The elytra are punctately sulcate, with smooth interstices.
