= Tamnoserica laevigata =

Scientific classification
- Kingdom: Animalia
- Phylum: Arthropoda
- Clade: Pancrustacea
- Class: Insecta
- Order: Coleoptera
- Suborder: Polyphaga
- Infraorder: Scarabaeiformia
- Family: Scarabaeidae
- Genus: Tamnoserica
- Species: T. laevigata

Binomial name
- Tamnoserica laevigata (Blanchard, 1850)

Synonyms
- Emphania laevigata Blanchard, 1850

Species of beetle

Tamnoserica laevigata is a species of beetle of the family Scarabaeidae. It is found in Madagascar.

== Description ==
Adults reach a length of about 4 mm. They have a rounded-oval, very glossy body. They are metallic blackish-green above, and brownish below, with some dull spots on the sides. The frons is finely and widely punctate with a smooth longitudinal line in the middle. The pronotum is relatively large and rounded, with the anterior angles pointed, the posterior angles broadly rounded, and the surface very finely, almost sparsely punctate. The scutellum is small and narrow. The elytra are punctate-striate, the striations consisting of a row of coarse punctures.
