= Tamnoserica =

Scientific classification
- Kingdom: Animalia
- Phylum: Arthropoda
- Clade: Pancrustacea
- Class: Insecta
- Order: Coleoptera
- Suborder: Polyphaga
- Infraorder: Scarabaeiformia
- Family: Scarabaeidae
- Subfamily: Sericinae
- Tribe: Sericini
- Genus: Tamnoserica; Brenske, 1899

Genus of leaf beetles

Tamnoserica is a genus of beetles belonging to the family Scarabaeidae.

== Species ==
- Tamnoserica laevigata (Blanchard, 1850)
- Tamnoserica lucidula (Blanchard, 1850)
- Tamnoserica mutans (Blanchard, 1850)
