= Tamnoserica mutans =

Scientific classification
- Kingdom: Animalia
- Phylum: Arthropoda
- Clade: Pancrustacea
- Class: Insecta
- Order: Coleoptera
- Suborder: Polyphaga
- Infraorder: Scarabaeiformia
- Family: Scarabaeidae
- Genus: Tamnoserica
- Species: T. mutans

Binomial name
- Tamnoserica mutans (Blanchard, 1850)

Synonyms
- Emphania mutans Blanchard, 1850; Serica pumila Burmeister, 1855

Species of beetle

Tamnoserica mutans is a species of beetle of the family Scarabaeidae. It is found in Madagascar.

== Description ==
Adults reach a length of about 3.5 mm. They have a rounded-oval, dull, iridescent body. They are dark above with a reddish colouration, while the underside is brownish. The legs are somewhat lighter. The pronotum is very broadly rounded at the posterior angles, the posterior margin slightly folded and somewhat projecting in front of the scutellum. The elytra are coarsely punctate in rows with a row of punctures, the intervals distinctly convex, so that the ribs are very noticeable despite the dense tomentum.
