= Microtrochalus hexaphyllus =

Scientific classification
- Kingdom: Animalia
- Phylum: Arthropoda
- Clade: Pancrustacea
- Class: Insecta
- Order: Coleoptera
- Suborder: Polyphaga
- Infraorder: Scarabaeiformia
- Family: Scarabaeidae
- Genus: Microtrochalus
- Species: M. hexaphyllus

Binomial name
- Microtrochalus hexaphyllus Moser, 1924

Species of beetle

Microtrochalus hexaphyllus is a species of beetle of the family Scarabaeidae. It is found in the Democratic Republic of the Congo.

== Description ==
Adults reach a length of about 5 mm. They are yellow and opaque, with the head, anterior part of the pronotum, scutellum and under surface more or less greenish. The elytra have a black border and centre. The antennae are yellow.
