= Microtrochalus plagiger =

Scientific classification
- Kingdom: Animalia
- Phylum: Arthropoda
- Class: Insecta
- Order: Coleoptera
- Suborder: Polyphaga
- Infraorder: Scarabaeiformia
- Family: Scarabaeidae
- Genus: Microtrochalus
- Species: M. plagiger

Binomial name
- Microtrochalus plagiger (Péringuey, 1892)

Synonyms
- Trochalus plagiger Péringuey, 1892; Microtrochalus bipunctatus Brenske, 1902

Species of beetle

Microtrochalus plagiger is a species of beetle of the family Scarabaeidae. It is found in Mozambique, Namibia, the Democratic Republic of the Congo, South Africa (KwaZulu-Natal) and Zimbabwe.

== Description ==
Adults reach a length of about 4 mm. They have an almost spherical body. The lower surface is dull black. The elytra are yellow with a small, rounded black spot in the middle. The elytral suture is narrow, with a broadly blackish-orange margin. The head and pronotum are dark greenish. The dark body parts have a dull silky sheen.
