= Microtrochalus xanthocerus =

Scientific classification
- Kingdom: Animalia
- Phylum: Arthropoda
- Class: Insecta
- Order: Coleoptera
- Suborder: Polyphaga
- Infraorder: Scarabaeiformia
- Family: Scarabaeidae
- Genus: Microtrochalus
- Species: M. xanthocerus

Binomial name
- Microtrochalus xanthocerus (Burmeister, 1855)

Synonyms
- Trochalus xanthocerus Burmeister, 1855

Species of beetle

Microtrochalus xanthocerus is a species of beetle of the family Scarabaeidae. It is found in South Africa (KwaZulu-Natal).

== Description ==
They have a black, ovate, moderately convex body. The elytra are remotely punctured, distinctly striated, and have a coppery sheen. The under side and legs are shiny and have bronze-green iridescence. The antennae are testaceous-yellow.
