= Microtrochalus =

Scientific classification
- Kingdom: Animalia
- Phylum: Arthropoda
- Class: Insecta
- Order: Coleoptera
- Suborder: Polyphaga
- Infraorder: Scarabaeiformia
- Family: Scarabaeidae
- Subfamily: Sericinae
- Tribe: Sericini
- Genus: Microtrochalus; Brenske, 1900

Genus of leaf beetles

Microtrochalus is a genus of beetles belonging to the family Scarabaeidae.

== Species ==
- Microtrochalus hexaphyllus Moser, 1924
- Microtrochalus plagiger (Péringuey, 1892)
- Microtrochalus xanthocerus (Burmeister, 1855)
