= Onychoserica longifoliata =

Scientific classification
- Kingdom: Animalia
- Phylum: Arthropoda
- Clade: Pancrustacea
- Class: Insecta
- Order: Coleoptera
- Suborder: Polyphaga
- Infraorder: Scarabaeiformia
- Family: Scarabaeidae
- Genus: Onychoserica
- Species: O. longifoliata

Binomial name
- Onychoserica longifoliata Moser, 1916

Species of beetle

Onychoserica longifoliata is a species of beetle of the family Scarabaeidae. It is found in the Democratic Republic of the Congo.

== Description ==
Adults reach a length of about 6–7 mm. They are very similar to Onychoserica flabellata in colour and size. The frons is widely punctate and somewhat dull. The elytra are slightly ribbed and rather sparsely punctate. The punctures with tiny setae, with some setae larger.
