= Onychoserica citrina =

Scientific classification
- Kingdom: Animalia
- Phylum: Arthropoda
- Clade: Pancrustacea
- Class: Insecta
- Order: Coleoptera
- Suborder: Polyphaga
- Infraorder: Scarabaeiformia
- Family: Scarabaeidae
- Genus: Onychoserica
- Species: O. citrina

Binomial name
- Onychoserica citrina Moser, 1924

Species of beetle

Onychoserica citrina is a species of beetle of the family Scarabaeidae. It is found in Tanzania.

== Description ==
Adults reach a length of about 5.5 mm. They are yellow and opaque, with punctures on the head.
