= Onychoserica =

Scientific classification
- Kingdom: Animalia
- Phylum: Arthropoda
- Clade: Pancrustacea
- Class: Insecta
- Order: Coleoptera
- Suborder: Polyphaga
- Infraorder: Scarabaeiformia
- Family: Scarabaeidae
- Subfamily: Sericinae
- Tribe: Sericini
- Genus: Onychoserica; Moser, 1916

Genus of leaf beetles

Onychoserica is a genus of beetles belonging to the family Scarabaeidae.

== Species ==
- Onychoserica brevifoliata Burgeon, 1947
- Onychoserica citrina Moser, 1924
- Onychoserica flabellata Moser, 1916
- Onychoserica longifoliata Moser, 1916
- Onychoserica quadrifoliata Burgeon, 1947
