= Onychoserica flabellata =

Scientific classification
- Kingdom: Animalia
- Phylum: Arthropoda
- Clade: Pancrustacea
- Class: Insecta
- Order: Coleoptera
- Suborder: Polyphaga
- Infraorder: Scarabaeiformia
- Family: Scarabaeidae
- Genus: Onychoserica
- Species: O. flabellata

Binomial name
- Onychoserica flabellata Moser, 1916

Species of beetle

Onychoserica flabellata is a species of beetle of the family Scarabaeidae. It is found in the Democratic Republic of the Congo.

== Description ==
Adults reach a length of about 7 mm. They are dull. The head is quite strongly punctate, while the pronotum is moderately punctate, with bristle-bearing lateral margins.
