= Cyrtotrochalus nitens =

Scientific classification
- Kingdom: Animalia
- Phylum: Arthropoda
- Class: Insecta
- Order: Coleoptera
- Suborder: Polyphaga
- Infraorder: Scarabaeiformia
- Family: Scarabaeidae
- Genus: Cyrtotrochalus
- Species: C. nitens

Binomial name
- Cyrtotrochalus nitens Frey, 1968

Species of beetle

Cyrtotrochalus nitens is a species of beetle of the family Scarabaeidae. It is found in Guinea.

== Description ==
Adults reach a length of about 10–11 mm. The upper and lower surfaces are dark brown (but the antennae are yellow) and shiny, the upper surface without hairs and the underside with a few ventral setae. The pronotum and scutellum are rather densely and finely punctate. The elytra are equally finely, but somewhat less densely punctate, with clearly visible striae.
