= Cyrtotrochalus =

Scientific classification
- Kingdom: Animalia
- Phylum: Arthropoda
- Class: Insecta
- Order: Coleoptera
- Suborder: Polyphaga
- Infraorder: Scarabaeiformia
- Family: Scarabaeidae
- Subfamily: Sericinae
- Tribe: Sericini
- Genus: Cyrtotrochalus; Brenske, 1900

Genus of leaf beetles

Cyrtotrochalus is a genus of beetles belonging to the family Scarabaeidae.

== Species ==
- Cyrtotrochalus magnus Moser, 1916
- Cyrtotrochalus nitens Frey, 1968
- Cyrtotrochalus opacus Brenske, 1902
