= Cyrtotrochalus opacus =

Scientific classification
- Kingdom: Animalia
- Phylum: Arthropoda
- Class: Insecta
- Order: Coleoptera
- Suborder: Polyphaga
- Infraorder: Scarabaeiformia
- Family: Scarabaeidae
- Genus: Cyrtotrochalus
- Species: C. opacus

Binomial name
- Cyrtotrochalus opacus Brenske, 1902

Species of beetle

Cyrtotrochalus opacus is a species of beetle of the family Scarabaeidae. It is found in Angola, Cameroon and Nigeria.

== Description ==
Adults reach a length of about 7 mm. They have a dark greenish, ovate body. The elytra have ten distinct puncture rows, the spaces between them are finely punctate.
