= Phyllotrochalus montanus =

Scientific classification
- Kingdom: Animalia
- Phylum: Arthropoda
- Class: Insecta
- Order: Coleoptera
- Suborder: Polyphaga
- Infraorder: Scarabaeiformia
- Family: Scarabaeidae
- Genus: Phyllotrochalus
- Species: P. montanus

Binomial name
- Phyllotrochalus montanus Brenske, 1902

Species of beetle

Phyllotrochalus montanus is a species of beetle of the family Scarabaeidae. It is found in the Democratic Republic of the Congo and Togo.

== Description ==
Adults reach a length of about 7.4 mm. They have a shiny, reddish-brown, egg-shaped body. The under surface is slightly redder. The pronotum is finely punctate. The elytra are covered with 5–6 fine rows of punctures.
