= Phyllotrochalus =

Scientific classification
- Kingdom: Animalia
- Phylum: Arthropoda
- Class: Insecta
- Order: Coleoptera
- Suborder: Polyphaga
- Infraorder: Scarabaeiformia
- Family: Scarabaeidae
- Subfamily: Sericinae
- Tribe: Sericini
- Genus: Phyllotrochalus; Brenske, 1900

Genus of leaf beetles

Phyllotrochalus is a genus of beetles belonging to the family Scarabaeidae.

== Species ==
- Phyllotrochalus colini Moser, 1916
- Phyllotrochalus montanus Brenske, 1902
- Phyllotrochalus pentaphyllus Burgeon, 1943
