= List of Maladera species =

These species belong to Maladera, a genus of May beetles and junebugs in the family Scarabaeidae.

== Maladera species ==
- Amaladera Reitter, 1896
  - Maladera cobosi Baraud, 1964
  - Maladera espagnoli Baraud, 1964
  - Maladera euphorbiae (Burmeister, 1855)
  - Maladera golovjankoi Medvedev, 1952
  - Maladera longipennis (Verdu, Mico & Galante, 1997)
- Aserica Lewis, 1895
  - Maladera secreta (Brenske, 1898)
  - Maladera shaowuensis Ahrens, Fabrizi & Liu, 2021
- Cycloserica Reitter, 1896
  - Maladera arenicola (Solsky, 1876)
  - Maladera caspia (Faldermann, 1836)
  - Maladera excisiceps (Reitter, 1896)
  - Maladera kerleyi Ahrens, 2004
  - Maladera mechiana Ahrens, 2004
  - Maladera paraquinquidens Ahrens, 2004
  - Maladera quinquidens (Brenske, 1896)
  - Maladera ustinovi (Gusakov, 2021)
- Eumaladera Nomura, 1967
  - Maladera fencli Ahrens, Fabrizi & Liu, 2021
  - Maladera fushanica (Ahrens, 2002)
  - Maladera gravida Ahrens, 2006
  - Maladera latitibia Nomura, 1974
  - Maladera loi (Kobayashi, 1991)
  - Maladera nitidiceps Nomura, 1967
  - Maladera nitididorsis Nomura, 1967
  - Maladera opaciventris (Moser, 1915)
  - Maladera paralatitibia (Ahrens, 2002)
  - Maladera planiuscula Nomura, 1974
  - Maladera puliensis (Ahrens, 2002)
  - Maladera robustula Ahrens, Fabrizi & Liu, 2021
  - Maladera subrugata (Moser, 1926)
  - Maladera wipfleri Ahrens, Fabrizi & Liu, 2021
  - Maladera yonaguniensis Kobayashi, Kusui & Imasaka, 2006
- Eusericula Reitter, 1902
  - Maladera ahrensi Keith, 2005
  - Maladera farsensis Petrovitz, 1980
  - Maladera frischi Keith, 2011
  - Maladera girardi Keith & Ahrens, 2002
  - Maladera hodkovae Nikodým & Král, 1998
  - Maladera jiraskovae Sehnal, 2008
  - Maladera kermanensis Fabrizi, Rößner & Ahrens, 2018
  - Maladera mirzayansi Montreuil & Keith, 2009
  - Maladera modesta (Fairmaire, 1881)
  - Maladera mofidii Montreuil & Keith, 2009
  - Maladera schnitteri Ahrens, Fabrizi & Rössner, 2016
  - Maladera sinaica Ahrens, 2000
- Hemiserica Brenske, 1894
  - Maladera armipes (Arrow, 1945)
  - Maladera ballariensis Ahrens & Fabrizi, 2016
  - Maladera bilobata (Arrow, 1945)
  - Maladera brevis (Blanchard, 1850)
  - Maladera eshanensis Ahrens, Fabrizi & Liu, 2021
  - Maladera fangchengensis Ahrens, Fabrizi & Liu, 2021
  - Maladera hsui Ahrens, Fabrizi & Liu, 2021
  - Maladera lorenzi Ahrens & Fabrizi, 2016
  - Maladera mutabilis (Fabricius, 1775)
  - Maladera nasuta (Brenske, 1894)
  - Maladera nasutella (Ahrens, 2004)
  - Maladera rufopaca Ahrens, Fabrizi & Liu, 2021
  - Maladera severini (Brenske, 1896)
  - Maladera subinaequalis Sreedevi & Ahrens, 2025
  - Maladera trilobata (Khan & Ghai, 1980)
- Macroserica Medvedev, 1952
  - Maladera allemandi Keith, 1998
  - Maladera angusta Baraud, 1990
  - Maladera apfelbecki Petrovitz, 1969
  - Maladera armeniaca Reitter, 1896
  - Maladera attaliensis Petrovitz, 1969
  - Maladera baluchestanica Petrovitz, 1971
  - Maladera besucheti Baraud, 1990
  - Maladera bruschii Sabatinelli, 1977
  - Maladera cerrutii Sabatinelli, 1977
  - Maladera dentipenis Sehnal & Simandl, 2008
  - Maladera fusconitens (Fairmaire, 1892)
  - Maladera iraqensis Keith, 2000
  - Maladera kermanica Montreuil, 2016
  - Maladera khuzestanica Montreuil, 2016
  - Maladera krueperi Petrovitz, 1969
  - Maladera lodosi Baraud, 1975
  - Maladera loebli Baraud, 1990
  - Maladera lyciensis Petrovitz, 1969
  - Maladera miliouensis Keith & Miessen, 2009
  - Maladera ollivieri Keith, 1998
  - Maladera phoenicica Petrovitz, 1969
  - Maladera punctatissima (Faldermann, 1836)
  - Maladera rugosa (Blanchard, 1850)
  - Maladera seleuciensis Petrovitz, 1969
  - Maladera syriaca Petrovitz, 1969
  - Maladera taurica Petrovitz, 1969
  - Maladera vignai Sabatinelli, 1977
  - Maladera wewalkai Petrovitz, 1969
- Maladera
  - Maladera alibagensis Ahrens & Fabrizi, 2016
  - Maladera allonitens Ahrens, Fabrizi & Liu, 2021
  - Maladera allopruinosa (Ahrens, 1998)
  - Maladera alloservitrita Sreedevi, Speer, Fabrizi & Ahrens, 2018
  - Maladera amamiana Nomura, 1959
  - Maladera amboliensis Ahrens & Fabrizi, 2016
  - Maladera anaimalaiensis Ahrens & Fabrizi, 2016
  - Maladera analis (Brenske, 1899)
  - Maladera andamana (Brenske, 1899)
  - Maladera anderssoni Fabrizi & Ahrens, 2014
  - Maladera andrewesi Ahrens & Fabrizi, 2016
  - Maladera annamensis (Moser, 1915)
  - Maladera antispinosa Ahrens & Fabrizi, 2016
  - Maladera apicalis Ahrens, Fabrizi & Liu, 2021
  - Maladera aptera Ahrens, Fabrizi & Liu, 2021
  - Maladera assamica (Moser, 1915)
  - Maladera aureola (Murayama, 1938)
  - Maladera badullana Fabrizi & Ahrens, 2014
  - Maladera bagmatiensis Ahrens, 2004
  - Maladera baii Ahrens, Fabrizi & Liu, 2021
  - Maladera baishaoensis Ahrens, Fabrizi & Liu, 2021
  - Maladera bakeri (Moser, 1915)
  - Maladera balphakramensis Ahrens & Fabrizi, 2016
  - Maladera bandarwelana Fabrizi & Ahrens, 2014
  - Maladera bansongchana Ahrens, Fabrizi & Liu, 2021
  - Maladera baoxingensis Ahrens, Fabrizi & Liu, 2021
  - Maladera barasingha Gupta, Bhunia, Ahrens & Chandra, 2025
  - Maladera basalis (Moser, 1915)
  - Maladera bawanglingana Ahrens, Fabrizi & Liu, 2021
  - Maladera bawanglingensis Ahrens, Fabrizi & Liu, 2021
  - Maladera beibengensis Ahrens, Fabrizi & Liu, 2021
  - Maladera beidouensis Ahrens, Fabrizi & Liu, 2021
  - Maladera bengalensis (Brenske, 1899)
  - Maladera bezdeki Bhunia, Gupta, Sarkar & Ahrens, 2023
  - Maladera bhutanensis (Frey, 1975)
  - Maladera bikouensis Ahrens, Fabrizi & Liu, 2021
  - Maladera bismarckiana (Brenske, 1899)
  - Maladera bisornata Fabrizi & Ahrens, 2014
  - Maladera botrytibia Nomura, 1974
  - Maladera breviata (Brenske, 1899)
  - Maladera breviatella Fabrizi & Ahrens, 2014
  - Maladera breviclava Ahrens, Fabrizi & Liu, 2021
  - Maladera brevistylis Ahrens, 2004
  - Maladera brincki Fabrizi & Ahrens, 2014
  - Maladera brunnescens (Frey, 1972)
  - Maladera bubengensis Ahrens, Fabrizi & Liu, 2021
  - Maladera burmeisteri (Brenske, 1899)
  - Maladera calcarata (Brenske, 1899)
  - Maladera calicutensis (Frey, 1972)
  - Maladera cambodjana (Frey, 1972)
  - Maladera cardamomensis Ahrens & Fabrizi, 2016
  - Maladera celebensis (Moser, 1915)
  - Maladera cervicornis Ranasinghe, Eberle, Benjamin & Ahrens, 2020
  - Maladera champhaiensis Gupta, Bhunia, Ahrens & Chandra, 2025
  - Maladera chenzhouana Ahrens, Fabrizi & Liu, 2021
  - Maladera chinensis (Moser, 1915)
  - Maladera chiruwae Ahrens, 2004
  - Maladera clavata (Frey, 1972)
  - Maladera coimbatoreensis Ahrens & Fabrizi, 2016
  - Maladera comosa (Brenske, 1899)
  - Maladera conspicua Ahrens, 2004
  - Maladera constans Ahrens & Fabrizi, 2016
  - Maladera constellata Ahrens, Fabrizi & Liu, 2021
  - Maladera consularis Ahrens & Fabrizi, 2009
  - Maladera contracta (Brenske, 1899)
  - Maladera costigera (Blanchard, 1850)
  - Maladera coxalis (Moser, 1915)
  - Maladera crenatotibialis Ahrens, Fabrizi & Liu, 2021
  - Maladera crenolatipes Ahrens, Fabrizi & Liu, 2021
  - Maladera crinifrons (Brenske, 1899)
  - Maladera curtipes (Moser, 1915)
  - Maladera daanensis Ahrens, Fabrizi & Liu, 2021
  - Maladera dadongshanica Ahrens, Fabrizi & Liu, 2021
  - Maladera dahanshana Kobayashi, 2016
  - Maladera dajuensis Ahrens, Fabrizi & Liu, 2021
  - Maladera dambullana Ranasinghe, Eberle, Athukorala, Benjamin & Ahrens, 2022
  - Maladera danfengensis Ahrens, Fabrizi & Liu, 2021
  - Maladera davaoana (Moser, 1921)
  - Maladera dayaoshanica Ahrens, Fabrizi & Liu, 2021
  - Maladera declarata Ahrens & Fabrizi, 2016
  - Maladera decolor Ahrens & Fabrizi, 2016
  - Maladera deenstana Ranasinghe, Eberle, Athukorala, Benjamin & Ahrens, 2022
  - Maladera densipilosa Ahrens & Fabrizi, 2016
  - Maladera detersa (Erichson, 1834)
  - Maladera diaolinensis Ahrens, Fabrizi & Liu, 2021
  - Maladera dimidiata Ahrens & Fabrizi, 2016
  - Maladera distincta (Moser, 1915)
  - Maladera diyalumana Fabrizi & Ahrens, 2014
  - Maladera drescheri (Moser, 1913)
  - Maladera dubia (Arrow, 1916)
  - Maladera duvivieri (Brenske, 1896)
  - Maladera eclogaria (Brenske, 1899)
  - Maladera egregia (Arrow, 1946)
  - Maladera ejimai Miyake & Imasaka, 1987
  - Maladera eluctabilis (Brenske, 1899)
  - Maladera emeifengensis Ahrens, Fabrizi & Liu, 2021
  - Maladera engana (Brenske, 1902)
  - Maladera eremita (Brenske, 1899)
  - Maladera erlangshanica Ahrens, Fabrizi & Liu, 2021
  - Maladera eusericina Ahrens & Fabrizi, 2016
  - Maladera excisiceps (Frey, 1972)
  - Maladera excisilabrata Ahrens, Fabrizi & Liu, 2021
  - Maladera exigua (Brenske, 1894)
  - Maladera eximia (Arrow, 1946)
  - Maladera fangana Ahrens, Fabrizi & Liu, 2021
  - Maladera fasciculata (Moser, 1922)
  - Maladera fastuosa Ahrens & Fabrizi, 2016
  - Maladera fatigata Ahrens, 2004
  - Maladera femorata (Brenske, 1899)
  - Maladera fengyangshanica Ahrens, Fabrizi & Liu, 2021
  - Maladera ferekanarana Ahrens & Fabrizi, 2016
  - Maladera fereobscurata Ahrens, Fabrizi & Liu, 2021
  - Maladera ferruginea (Kollar & Redtenbacher, 1848)
  - Maladera festina (Brenske, 1899)
  - Maladera filigraniforceps Ahrens, Fabrizi & Liu, 2021
  - Maladera fistulosa (Brenske, 1899)
  - Maladera flammea (Brenske, 1899)
  - Maladera flavipennis Ahrens, Fabrizi & Liu, 2021
  - Maladera flinti Fabrizi & Ahrens, 2014
  - Maladera floresina (Brenske, 1899)
  - Maladera freyi Ahrens & Fabrizi, 2016
  - Maladera fuanensis Ahrens, Fabrizi & Liu, 2021
  - Maladera fulgida (Brenske, 1899)
  - Maladera fuliginosa (Burmeister, 1855)
  - Maladera fumosa (Brenske, 1899)
  - Maladera fuscescens (Moser, 1917)
  - Maladera fuscipes (Moser, 1915)
  - Maladera futschauana (Brenske, 1898)
  - Maladera galdaththana Ranasinghe, Eberle, Benjamin & Ahrens, 2020
  - Maladera ganglbaueri (Brenske, 1899)
  - Maladera gansuensis (Miyake & Yamaya, 2001)
  - Maladera garoana Ahrens & Fabrizi, 2016
  - Maladera geniculata Ahrens & Fabrizi, 2016
  - Maladera gibbiventris (Brenske, 1898)
  - Maladera gopaldharae Ahrens, 2004
  - Maladera gorkhae Ahrens, 2004
  - Maladera granigera Ahrens & Fabrizi, 2016
  - Maladera granuligera (Blanchard, 1850)
  - Maladera guangzhaishanica Ahrens, Fabrizi & Liu, 2021
  - Maladera guanxianensis Ahrens, Fabrizi & Liu, 2021
  - Maladera guanxiensis Ahrens, Fabrizi & Liu, 2021
  - Maladera guomenshanica Ahrens, Fabrizi & Liu, 2021
  - Maladera gusakovi Ahrens, Fabrizi & Liu, 2021
  - Maladera guttula (Sharp, 1876)
  - Maladera haba Ahrens, Fabrizi & Liu, 2021
  - Maladera habashanensis Ahrens, Fabrizi & Liu, 2021
  - Maladera haldwaniensis Ahrens, 2004
  - Maladera hampsoni Ahrens & Fabrizi, 2016
  - Maladera haniel Ranasinghe, Eberle, Athukorala, Benjamin & Ahrens, 2022
  - Maladera hansmalickyi Ahrens, Fabrizi & Liu, 2021
  - Maladera harmonica (Brenske, 1898)
  - Maladera hastata Fabrizi & Ahrens, 2014
  - Maladera hauseri (Brenske, 1899)
  - Maladera hayashii Hirasawa, 1991
  - Maladera heveli Fabrizi & Ahrens, 2014
  - Maladera hiemalis Kobayashi, 2014
  - Maladera hiyarensis Ranasinghe, Eberle, Athukorala, Benjamin & Ahrens, 2022
  - Maladera hmong Ahrens, 2004
  - Maladera holosericea (Scopoli, 1772)
  - Maladera holzschuhi Ahrens, 2004
  - Maladera hongyuanensis Ahrens, Fabrizi & Liu, 2021
  - Maladera horii (Kobayashi, 2010)
  - Maladera hortonensis Fabrizi & Ahrens, 2014
  - Maladera houzhenziensis Ahrens, Fabrizi & Liu, 2021
  - Maladera howdeni Ahrens, 2003
  - Maladera huanianensis Ahrens, Fabrizi & Liu, 2021
  - Maladera hubeiensis Ahrens, Fabrizi & Liu, 2021
  - Maladera hui Ahrens, Fabrizi & Liu, 2021
  - Maladera hunanensis Ahrens, Fabrizi & Liu, 2021
  - Maladera hunliensis Ahrens & Fabrizi, 2016
  - Maladera hunuguensis Ahrens, Fabrizi & Liu, 2021
  - Maladera hutiaoensis Ahrens, Fabrizi & Liu, 2021
  - Maladera iliganica (Moser, 1917)
  - Maladera imasakai Miyake & Yamaya, 1995
  - Maladera imbella Reitter, 1898
  - Maladera impressithorax Nomura, 1973
  - Maladera impubis Ahrens, 2004
  - Maladera inadai (Kobayashi, 2010)
  - Maladera inaequabilis (Brenske, 1899)
  - Maladera indica (Blanchard, 1850)
  - Maladera inermis (Brenske, 1899)
  - Maladera inimica (Brenske, 1899)
  - Maladera initialis Ahrens & Fabrizi, 2016
  - Maladera inornata (Brenske, 1899)
  - Maladera insularis (Brenske, 1899)
  - Maladera invenusta (Moser, 1918)
  - Maladera iridicauda (Fairmaire, 1893)
  - Maladera irididorsis Ahrens, 2004
  - Maladera isarogensis (Moser, 1922)
  - Maladera iuga Fabrizi & Ahrens, 2014
  - Maladera jaintiaensis Ahrens & Fabrizi, 2016
  - Maladera japonica (Motschulsky, 1860)
  - Maladera jaroslavi Ahrens, Fabrizi & Liu, 2021
  - Maladera jatuai Ahrens, Fabrizi & Liu, 2021
  - Maladera jiangi Ahrens, Fabrizi & Liu, 2021
  - Maladera jingdongensis Ahrens, Fabrizi & Liu, 2021
  - Maladera jinggangshanica Ahrens, Fabrizi & Liu, 2021
  - Maladera jinghongensis Ahrens, Fabrizi & Liu, 2021
  - Maladera jiucailingensis Ahrens, Fabrizi & Liu, 2021
  - Maladera jizuana Ahrens, Fabrizi & Liu, 2021
  - Maladera judithae Sreedevi & Ahrens, 2025
  - Maladera kaimurensis Chandra, Ahrens, Bhunia, Sreedevi & Gupta, 2021
  - Maladera kalawensis Ahrens, Fabrizi & Liu, 2021
  - Maladera kallarensis Ahrens & Fabrizi, 2016
  - Maladera kamiyai (Sawada, 1937)
  - Maladera kanarana (Moser, 1918)
  - Maladera kandyensis Fabrizi & Ahrens, 2014
  - Maladera kaohsiungensis Kobayashi, 2023
  - Maladera karunaratnae Ranasinghe, Eberle, Athukorala, Benjamin & Ahrens, 2022
  - Maladera kasigurana (Moser, 1922)
  - Maladera kawaharai (Kobayashi, 2010)
  - Maladera kazirangae Ahrens, 2004
  - Maladera keralensis (Frey, 1972)
  - Maladera kinabaluensis (Brenske, 1899)
  - Maladera kishi Ranasinghe, Eberle, Athukorala, Benjamin & Ahrens, 2022
  - Maladera kobayashii Nomura, 1974
  - Maladera kolasibensis Sreedevi, Speer, Fabrizi & Ahrens, 2018
  - Maladera kolkataensis Bhunia, Gupta, Sarkar & Ahrens, 2023
  - Maladera kottagudiensis Chandra, Ahrens, Bhunia, Sreedevi & Gupta, 2021
  - Maladera krali Ahrens, 2004
  - Maladera kreyenbergi (Moser, 1918)
  - Maladera kryschanowskii Ahrens, Fabrizi & Liu, 2021
  - Maladera kubeceki Ahrens, Fabrizi & Liu, 2021
  - Maladera kubotai Nomura & Kobayashi, 1979
  - Maladera kumilyensis Ahrens & Fabrizi, 2016
  - Maladera kunigami Kobayashi, Kusui & Imasaka, 2006
  - Maladera kuruwitana Fabrizi & Ahrens, 2014
  - Maladera kusuii Miyake, 1986
  - Maladera laminifera (Moser, 1916)
  - Maladera lanae Kobayashi, 2012
  - Maladera laocaiensis Ahrens, Fabrizi & Liu, 2021
  - Maladera lata (Brenske, 1902)
  - Maladera laticrus (Moser, 1915)
  - Maladera levis (Frey, 1972)
  - Maladera lianxianensis Ahrens, Fabrizi & Liu, 2021
  - Maladera liaochengensis Ahrens, Fabrizi & Liu, 2021
  - Maladera lindulana Fabrizi & Ahrens, 2014
  - Maladera liwenzhui Ahrens, Fabrizi & Liu, 2021
  - Maladera lonaviaensis Ahrens & Fabrizi, 2016
  - Maladera longruiensis Ahrens, Fabrizi & Liu, 2021
  - Maladera lugubris (Brenske, 1896)
  - Maladera lukjanovitschi (Medvedev, 1966)
  - Maladera lumlaensis Gupta, Bhunia, Ahrens & Chandra, 2025
  - Maladera luoxiangensis Ahrens, Fabrizi & Liu, 2021
  - Maladera lushanensis Ahrens, Fabrizi & Liu, 2021
  - Maladera lushuiensis Ahrens, Fabrizi & Liu, 2021
  - Maladera madurensis (Moser, 1915)
  - Maladera maedai Nomura, 1974
  - Maladera magnicornis (Moser, 1920)
  - Maladera magnidentata Miyake & Yamaguchi, 1998
  - Maladera maguanensis Ahrens, Fabrizi & Liu, 2021
  - Maladera malabarensis Ahrens & Fabrizi, 2016
  - Maladera malangeana (Brenske, 1902)
  - Maladera malaya (Brenske, 1899)
  - Maladera manipurana (Brenske, 1899)
  - Maladera maoershana Ahrens, Fabrizi & Liu, 2021
  - Maladera marginella (Hope, 1831)
  - Maladera mavilluensis Fabrizi & Ahrens, 2014
  - Maladera maxima (Brenske, 1899)
  - Maladera mekong Miyake & Yamaguchi, 1998
  - Maladera merkli Ahrens, 2004
  - Maladera minops Ahrens & Fabrizi, 2016
  - Maladera mizoramensis Sreedevi, Speer, Fabrizi & Ahrens, 2018
  - Maladera mjobergi (Moser, 1932)
  - Maladera modestula (Brenske, 1902)
  - Maladera moebiusi (Brenske, 1899)
  - Maladera motschulskyi (Brenske, 1898)
  - Maladera mupingensis Ahrens, Fabrizi & Liu, 2021
  - Maladera murzini Ahrens, 2004
  - Maladera muscula (Frey, 1972)
  - Maladera mussardi Ahrens & Fabrizi, 2016
  - Maladera mussooriensis Ahrens, 2004
  - Maladera mutabilis (Fabricius, 1781)
  - Maladera mysoreensis Ahrens & Fabrizi, 2016
  - Maladera nabanensis Ahrens, Fabrizi & Liu, 2021
  - Maladera naduvatamensis Ahrens & Fabrizi, 2016
  - Maladera namborensis Ahrens & Fabrizi, 2016
  - Maladera nanlingensis Ahrens, Fabrizi & Liu, 2021
  - Maladera nanpingensis Ahrens, Fabrizi & Liu, 2021
  - Maladera nantouensis Kobayashi, 2022
  - Maladera naveeni Sreedevi, Ranasinghe, Fabrizi & Ahrens, 2019
  - Maladera neotridentipes Ahrens & Fabrizi, 2016
  - Maladera nigrobrunnea (Moser, 1926)
  - Maladera nigrolucida Ahrens & Fabrizi, 2016
  - Maladera nigromicans (Frey, 1973)
  - Maladera nigrorubra (Brenske, 1894)
  - Maladera nilaveliensis Fabrizi & Ahrens, 2014
  - Maladera ninglangensis Ahrens, Fabrizi & Liu, 2021
  - Maladera nitens (Moser, 1915)
  - Maladera nitidipes (Moser, 1915)
  - Maladera nomurai Hirasawa, 1991
  - Maladera obscurata (Moser, 1915)
  - Maladera okinawaensis Kobayashi, 1978
  - Maladera okinoerabuana Kobayashi, 1978
  - Maladera onam Gupta, Bhunia, Ahrens & Chandra, 2025
  - Maladera opaca (Moser, 1924)
  - Maladera opacifrons (Fairmaire, 1891)
  - Maladera opima Nomura, 1967
  - Maladera ostentatrix (Brenske, 1899)
  - Maladera padaviyaensis Ahrens & Fabrizi, 2016
  - Maladera pallida (Burmeister, 1855)
  - Maladera palona (Brenske, 1899)
  - Maladera panyuensis Ahrens, Fabrizi & Liu, 2021
  - Maladera parabikouensis Zhao & Ahrens, 2023
  - Maladera parabrunnescens Ahrens, Fabrizi & Liu, 2021
  - Maladera paradaanensis Liu, Ahrens, Li & Yang, 2024
  - Maladera paradetersa Ahrens, Fabrizi & Liu, 2021
  - Maladera paranantouensis Kobayashi, 2022
  - Maladera paranitens Ahrens, Fabrizi & Liu, 2021
  - Maladera paraserripes Ahrens, Fabrizi & Liu, 2021
  - Maladera paris Ahrens, 2004
  - Maladera parobscurata Ahrens, Fabrizi & Liu, 2021
  - Maladera parva (Moser, 1908)
  - Maladera pauper Ahrens & Fabrizi, 2016
  - Maladera peguana (Brenske, 1899)
  - Maladera peregoi Ahrens, Fabrizi & Liu, 2021
  - Maladera philippinensis (Blanchard, 1850)
  - Maladera philippinica (Brenske, 1894)
  - Maladera phuntsholingensis Ahrens, 2004
  - Maladera piceola (Moser, 1915)
  - Maladera pieli Ahrens, Fabrizi & Liu, 2021
  - Maladera pingchuanensis Ahrens, Fabrizi & Liu, 2021
  - Maladera placida (Frey, 1972)
  - Maladera pokharae Ahrens, 2004
  - Maladera polunini Ahrens, 2004
  - Maladera poonensis (Khan & Ghai, 1980)
  - Maladera poonmudi (Frey, 1975)
  - Maladera poyagana Fabrizi & Ahrens, 2014
  - Maladera praviforceps Ahrens & Fabrizi, 2016
  - Maladera prenai Ahrens, 2004
  - Maladera profana Ahrens & Fabrizi, 2016
  - Maladera propagator Ahrens & Fabrizi, 2016
  - Maladera proxima (Burmeister, 1855)
  - Maladera pseudoconsularis Ahrens, Fabrizi & Liu, 2021
  - Maladera pseudoegregia Ahrens, Fabrizi & Liu, 2021
  - Maladera pseudoexima Ahrens, Fabrizi & Liu, 2021
  - Maladera pseudofuscipes Ahrens, Fabrizi & Liu, 2021
  - Maladera pseudonitens Ahrens, Fabrizi & Liu, 2021
  - Maladera pseudosenta Ahrens, Fabrizi & Liu, 2021
  - Maladera pubescens (Arrow, 1916)
  - Maladera pui Ahrens, Fabrizi & Liu, 2021
  - Maladera punctulata (Frey, 1972)
  - Maladera putaodiensis Ahrens, Fabrizi & Liu, 2021
  - Maladera qianqingtangensis Ahrens, Fabrizi & Liu, 2021
  - Maladera queinneci Ahrens, Fabrizi & Liu, 2021
  - Maladera raptiensis Ahrens, 2004
  - Maladera reichenowi (Brenske, 1902)
  - Maladera renardi (Ballion, 1871)
  - Maladera reyaensis Bhunia, Chandra, Gupta & Ahrens, 2021
  - Maladera rolciki Ahrens, 2004
  - Maladera romanoi Fabrizi & Ahrens, 2014
  - Maladera rosettae (Frey, 1972)
  - Maladera rotunda (Arrow, 1946)
  - Maladera rotundata (Walker, 1859)
  - Maladera rubida (Moser, 1915)
  - Maladera rubriventris Ahrens, Fabrizi & Liu, 2021
  - Maladera rudimentalis Ahrens & Fabrizi, 2016
  - Maladera rudis (Brenske, 1899)
  - Maladera rufescens (Nonfried, 1894)
  - Maladera ruficollis (Brenske, 1899)
  - Maladera rufodorsata (Fairmaire, 1888)
  - Maladera rufonitida Ahrens, Fabrizi & Liu, 2021
  - Maladera rufoplagiata (Fairmaire, 1893)
  - Maladera rufotestacea (Moser, 1915)
  - Maladera rustica (Brenske, 1896)
  - Maladera saginata (Brenske, 1899)
  - Maladera sagittula Ahrens & Fabrizi, 2016
  - Maladera saitoi (Niijima & Kinoshita, 1927)
  - Maladera sancta (Brenske, 1899)
  - Maladera sanqingshanica Ahrens, Fabrizi & Liu, 2021
  - Maladera sapitana (Moser, 1916)
  - Maladera satrapa (Brenske, 1899)
  - Maladera schenklingi (Moser, 1918)
  - Maladera schereri (Frey, 1975)
  - Maladera schintlmeisteri Fabrizi & Ahrens, 2014
  - Maladera schoenwitzae Ahrens & Fabrizi, 2016
  - Maladera sedula Ahrens & Fabrizi, 2016
  - Maladera sempiterna (Brenske, 1899)
  - Maladera sempiternella Ahrens & Fabrizi, 2016
  - Maladera senfti Ahrens & Fabrizi, 2016
  - Maladera senta (Brenske, 1898)
  - Maladera seriatoguttata Ahrens & Fabrizi, 2016
  - Maladera sericella (Brenske, 1899)
  - Maladera serratiforceps Ahrens, Fabrizi & Liu, 2021
  - Maladera serripes (Moser, 1915)
  - Maladera servitrita (Brenske, 1899)
  - Maladera setifera (Gyllenhal, 1817)
  - Maladera setosa (Brenske, 1896)
  - Maladera setosiventris (Moser, 1916)
  - Maladera shaluishanica Ahrens, Fabrizi & Liu, 2021
  - Maladera shangraoensis Ahrens, Fabrizi & Liu, 2021
  - Maladera shenglongi Ahrens, Fabrizi & Liu, 2021
  - Maladera shengqiaoae Ahrens, Fabrizi & Liu, 2021
  - Maladera shihzitouensis Kobayashi, 2002
  - Maladera shikengkongensis Zhao & Ahrens, 2023
  - Maladera shiruguanensis Ahrens, Fabrizi & Liu, 2021
  - Maladera shiwandashanensis Ahrens, Fabrizi & Liu, 2021
  - Maladera shouchiana Kobayashi & Yu, 1997
  - Maladera shoumanensis Ahrens, Fabrizi & Liu, 2021
  - Maladera siamensis (Nonfried, 1891)
  - Maladera siargaoensis (Moser, 1922)
  - Maladera signatitarsis (Brenske, 1899)
  - Maladera significabilis (Brenske, 1902)
  - Maladera significans (Brenske, 1899)
  - Maladera sikkimensis (Brenske, 1899)
  - Maladera silviae Sreedevi & Ahrens, 2025
  - Maladera silviafabriziae Chandra, Ahrens, Bhunia, Sreedevi & Gupta, 2021
  - Maladera sincera (Brenske, 1899)
  - Maladera siniaevi Ahrens, 2004
  - Maladera sinica (Hope, 1842)
  - Maladera sinistra (Brenske, 1898)
  - Maladera sinobiloba Ahrens, Fabrizi & Liu, 2021
  - Maladera sinuosa (Brenske, 1899)
  - Maladera siwalikiana Ahrens, 2004
  - Maladera snizeki Ahrens, Fabrizi & Liu, 2021
  - Maladera solida (Brenske, 1899)
  - Maladera songi Ahrens, Fabrizi & Liu, 2021
  - Maladera songsakensis Ahrens & Fabrizi, 2016
  - Maladera sordida (Brenske, 1899)
  - Maladera sparsesetosa (Moser, 1922)
  - Maladera spatulata Ahrens, 2006
  - Maladera spei Ahrens, 2004
  - Maladera spinifemorata Kobayashi, 1993
  - Maladera spinifera (Brenske, 1899)
  - †Maladera spinitibialis Statz, 1952
  - Maladera spinosa (Brenske, 1899)
  - Maladera spiralis Ahrens, 2003
  - Maladera spissa (Brenske, 1899)
  - Maladera spissigrada (Brenske, 1898)
  - Maladera staturosa (Brenske, 1899)
  - Maladera stipidosa (Brenske, 1899)
  - Maladera stolida (Brenske, 1899)
  - Maladera straba (Brenske, 1899)
  - Maladera straminea (Moser, 1915)
  - Maladera stricta (Brenske, 1899)
  - Maladera stridula (Brenske, 1898)
  - Maladera strumina (Brenske, 1899)
  - Maladera subaana (Moser, 1922)
  - Maladera submucronata Ahrens & Fabrizi, 2016
  - Maladera subtruncata (Fairmaire, 1887)
  - Maladera sujitrae Sreedevi, Ranasinghe, Fabrizi & Ahrens, 2019
  - Maladera sumbana (Moser, 1915)
  - Maladera sumbawana (Brenske, 1899)
  - Maladera sylhetensis Ahrens & Fabrizi, 2016
  - Maladera taiheii Kobayashi, 2016
  - Maladera taiwana Nomura, 1974
  - Maladera taiwanensis Kobayashi, 2022
  - Maladera taiyal Kobayashi, 2002
  - Maladera taiyangheensis Ahrens, Fabrizi & Liu, 2021
  - Maladera taoyuanensis Kobayashi, 1991
  - Maladera teinzoana (Brenske, 1899)
  - Maladera tempestiva Ahrens & Fabrizi, 2016
  - Maladera tengchongensis Ahrens, Fabrizi & Liu, 2021
  - Maladera thandigudiensis Sreedevi & Ahrens, 2025
  - Maladera theresae Ahrens & Fabrizi, 2016
  - Maladera thirthahalliensis Sreedevi, Ranasinghe, Fabrizi & Ahrens, 2019
  - Maladera thomsoni (Brenske, 1894)
  - Maladera tiachiensis Ahrens, Fabrizi & Liu, 2021
  - Maladera tiammushanica Ahrens, Fabrizi & Liu, 2021
  - Maladera tiani Ahrens, Fabrizi & Liu, 2021
  - Maladera tianqiae Liu, Ahrens, Li & Yang, 2024
  - Maladera tianzhushanica Ahrens, Fabrizi & Liu, 2021
  - Maladera tibialis (Brenske, 1899)
  - Maladera tienchihna Kobayashi, 1988
  - Maladera tienhsiangensis Kobayashi, 2007
  - Maladera tokunoshimana Kobayashi, Kusui & Imasaka, 2006
  - Maladera tongzhongensis Ahrens, Fabrizi & Liu, 2021
  - Maladera tranquebarica (Brenske, 1899)
  - Maladera trichotibialis Ahrens, 2004
  - Maladera tricuspidata Fabrizi & Ahrens, 2014
  - Maladera tridentipes Nomura, 1974
  - Maladera trifidiforceps Ahrens, Fabrizi & Liu, 2021
  - Maladera tripuraensis Chandra, Ahrens, Bhunia, Sreedevi & Gupta, 2021
  - Maladera trivandrumensis Ahrens & Fabrizi, 2016
  - Maladera trochaloides Ahrens & Fabrizi, 2016
  - Maladera tubulata Ahrens & Fabrizi, 2016
  - Maladera tumida Ahrens, 2004
  - Maladera uggalkaltotaensis Fabrizi & Ahrens, 2014
  - Maladera uhligi Ahrens, 2004
  - Maladera ukerewensis (Moser, 1917)
  - Maladera umbilicata (Brenske, 1899)
  - Maladera umbratica (Brenske, 1899)
  - Maladera uncipenis Ahrens, Fabrizi & Liu, 2021
  - Maladera unguicularis (Brenske, 1899)
  - Maladera utacamanda (Brenske, 1899)
  - Maladera varia (Brenske, 1899)
  - Maladera ventralis (Brenske, 1898)
  - Maladera ventriosa (Brenske, 1894)
  - Maladera vernacula Ahrens & Fabrizi, 2016
  - Maladera versuta Ahrens & Fabrizi, 2016
  - Maladera vethi (Moser, 1916)
  - Maladera viraktamathi Sreedevi, Ranasinghe, Fabrizi & Ahrens, 2019
  - Maladera wandingana Ahrens, Fabrizi & Liu, 2021
  - Maladera watanabei Kobayashi, 2002
  - Maladera weigeli Ahrens, 2004
  - Maladera weligamana (Brenske, 1900)
  - Maladera windy Ranasinghe, Eberle, Athukorala, Benjamin & Ahrens, 2022
  - Maladera wolfgangdierli Ahrens, 2004
  - Maladera woodi Fabrizi & Ahrens, 2014
  - Maladera wulaoshanica Ahrens, Fabrizi & Liu, 2021
  - Maladera wupingensis Ahrens, Fabrizi & Liu, 2021
  - Maladera xanthoptera Ahrens & Fabrizi, 2016
  - Maladera xingkeyangi Ahrens, Fabrizi & Liu, 2021
  - Maladera xinqiaoensis Ahrens, Fabrizi & Liu, 2021
  - Maladera xuezhongi Ahrens, Fabrizi & Liu, 2021
  - Maladera yaeyamana Nomura, 1963
  - Maladera yakouensis Ahrens, Fabrizi & Liu, 2021
  - Maladera yakushimana Kobayashi, Kusui & Imasaka, 2006
  - Maladera yalaensis Fabrizi & Ahrens, 2014
  - Maladera yangi Ahrens, Fabrizi & Liu, 2021
  - Maladera yipinglangensis Ahrens, Fabrizi & Liu, 2021
  - Maladera yongrenensis Ahrens, Fabrizi & Liu, 2021
  - Maladera yunnanica Ahrens, Fabrizi & Liu, 2021
  - Maladera zeta (Dalla Torre, 1912)
  - Maladera zhanchaoi Zhao & Ahrens, 2023
  - Maladera zhejiangensis Ahrens, Fabrizi & Liu, 2021
- Omaladera Reitter, 1901
  - Maladera affinis (Blanchard, 1850)
  - Maladera allolaterita Ahrens & Fabrizi, 2016
  - Maladera anhuiensis Ahrens, Fabrizi & Liu, 2021
  - Maladera bangaloreensis Ahrens & Fabrizi, 2016
  - Maladera beata (Brenske, 1902)
  - Maladera boettcheri (Moser, 1926)
  - Maladera bombycina (Karsch, 1882)
  - Maladera bombycinoides Ahrens & Fabrizi, 2016
  - Maladera businskyorum Ahrens, Fabrizi & Liu, 2021
  - Maladera caifensis (Brenske, 1898)
  - Maladera cardoni (Brenske, 1896)
  - Maladera cariniceps (Moser, 1915)
  - Maladera carinifrons (Brenske, 1896)
  - Maladera cinnaberina (Brenske, 1899)
  - Maladera clypeata (Fairmaire, 1887)
  - Maladera dahongshanica Ahrens, Fabrizi & Liu, 2021
  - Maladera dierli (Frey, 1969)
  - Maladera diversipes Moser, 1915
  - Maladera dunhindaensis Ahrens & Fabrizi, 2016
  - Maladera ekisi Fabrizi & Ahrens, 2014
  - Maladera emmrichi Ahrens, 2004
  - Maladera enigma Ahrens, Fabrizi & Liu, 2021
  - Maladera faceta Ahrens & Fabrizi, 2016
  - Maladera formosae (Brenske, 1899)
  - Maladera fusca (Frey, 1972)
  - Maladera gardneri Ahrens, 2004
  - Maladera globosa (Frey, 1972)
  - Maladera guangdongana Ahrens, Fabrizi & Liu, 2021
  - Maladera guomenshanensis Ahrens, Fabrizi & Liu, 2021
  - Maladera hajeki Ahrens, Fabrizi & Liu, 2021
  - Maladera hiekei (Frey, 1972)
  - Maladera himalayica (Brenske, 1896)
  - Maladera hongkongica (Brenske, 1899)
  - Maladera ignava (Brenske, 1894)
  - Maladera infuscata (Moser, 1915)
  - Maladera insanabilis (Brenske, 1894)
  - Maladera iridescens (Blanchard, 1850)
  - Maladera joachimi Ahrens, 2004
  - Maladera johannesi Ahrens & Fabrizi, 2016
  - Maladera juntongi Ahrens, Fabrizi & Liu, 2021
  - Maladera kawaii (Kobayashi, 2010)
  - Maladera kostali Ahrens & Fabrizi, 2016
  - Maladera krombeini Fabrizi & Ahrens, 2014
  - Maladera kumei Kobayashi, 1990
  - Maladera lateritia (Moser, 1915)
  - Maladera lignicolor (Fairmaire, 1887)
  - Maladera lishana Miyake, 1989
  - Maladera longiclava (Moser, 1926)
  - Maladera luteola (Moser, 1918)
  - Maladera masumotoi Nomura, 1974
  - Maladera mollis (Walker, 1859)
  - Maladera mulmeina (Brenske, 1899)
  - Maladera nagporeana (Brenske, 1899)
  - Maladera nakamurai Miyake, 1991
  - Maladera nanshanchiana Nomura, 1974
  - Maladera nilgirina (Frey, 1972)
  - Maladera omanica (Ahrens, 2000)
  - Maladera orientalis (Motschulsky, 1857)
  - Maladera oshimana Nomura, 1962
  - Maladera ovatula (Fairmaire, 1891)
  - Maladera paraprabangana Ahrens & Fabrizi, 2016
  - Maladera perniciosa (Brenske, 1899)
  - Maladera prabangana (Brenske, 1899)
  - Maladera pseudohongkongica Ahrens & Fabrizi, 2016
  - Maladera pseudomollis Fabrizi & Ahrens, 2014
  - Maladera riberai Ahrens, Fabrizi & Liu, 2021
  - Maladera rufocuprea (Blanchard, 1850)
  - Maladera satoi Nomura, 1961
  - Maladera sauteri (Moser, 1918)
  - Maladera shimogana Ahrens & Fabrizi, 2016
  - Maladera shiniushanensis Ahrens, Fabrizi & Liu, 2021
  - Maladera shiva Ahrens & Fabrizi, 2016
  - Maladera simlana (Brenske, 1899)
  - Maladera slateri Ahrens & Fabrizi, 2016
  - Maladera sontica (Brenske, 1899)
  - Maladera sprecherae Ahrens, 2004
  - Maladera stevensi Ahrens, 2004
  - Maladera subabbreviata Ahrens & Fabrizi, 2016
  - Maladera sunaiensis Ahrens & Fabrizi, 2016
  - Maladera tiefermanni Ahrens & Fabrizi, 2016
  - Maladera tomentosa (Frey, 1972)
  - Maladera tridentata (Moser, 1918)
  - Maladera tridenticeps (Moser, 1915)
  - Maladera tyrannica (Brenske, 1894)
  - Maladera vulpecula (Arrow, 1946)
  - Maladera weni Ahrens, Fabrizi & Liu, 2021
  - Maladera westermanni (Brenske, 1899)
  - Maladera wuliangshanensis Ahrens, Fabrizi & Liu, 2021
  - Maladera xingkei Ahrens, Fabrizi & Liu, 2021
  - Maladera yasutoshii Nomura, 1974
  - Maladera yibini Ahrens, Fabrizi & Liu, 2021
- subgenus unassigned
  - Maladera conchinchinae (Brenske, 1899)

== Selected former species ==
- Maladera distincta (Moser, 1915)^{c}
- Maladera insubida (Brenske, 1898)^{c g}
- Maladera liotibia Nomura, 1974^{c g}
- Maladera major (Arrow, 1946)^{c g}
- Maladera schoenfeldti (Murayama, 1937)^{c g}
- Maladera subspinosa (Brenske, 1898)^{c g}
