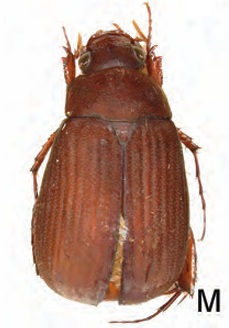

Scientific classification
- Kingdom: Animalia
- Phylum: Arthropoda
- Class: Insecta
- Order: Coleoptera
- Suborder: Polyphaga
- Infraorder: Scarabaeiformia
- Family: Scarabaeidae
- Genus: Maladera
- Species: M. perniciosa

Binomial name
- Maladera perniciosa (Brenske, 1899)

Synonyms
- Autoserica perniciosa Brenske, 1899; Autoserica rubescens Moser, 1908

= Maladera perniciosa =

Species of beetle

Maladera perniciosa is a species of beetle of the family Scarabaeidae. It is found in Laos, Thailand, Vietnam, China (Shaanxi, Sichuan, Xizang, Yunnan) and Nepal.

== Description ==
Adults reach a length of about 7.6–9.7 mm. They have a light or dark reddish-brown, oblong-oval body. The upper surface is mostly dull (sometimes with an iridescent sheen) and glabrous, except for some setae on the head and the lateral cilia of the pronotum and elytra.
