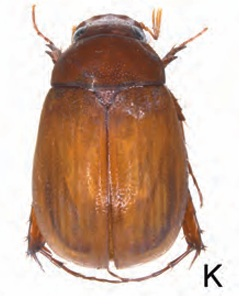

Scientific classification
- Kingdom: Animalia
- Phylum: Arthropoda
- Class: Insecta
- Order: Coleoptera
- Suborder: Polyphaga
- Infraorder: Scarabaeiformia
- Family: Scarabaeidae
- Genus: Maladera
- Species: M. kostali

Binomial name
- Maladera kostali Ahrens & Fabrizi, 2016

= Maladera kostali =

Species of beetle

Maladera kostali is a species of beetle of the family Scarabaeidae. It is found in India (Tamil Nadu) and Sri Lanka.

== Description ==
Adults reach a length of about 6.5–6.9 mm. They have a reddish brown, oblong-oval body, with the elytra slightly lighter and the antennae yellowish. The dorsal surface is mostly dull and nearly glabrous, except for a few short setae on sides of the elytra.

== Etymology ==
The species is named after one of its collectors, Mr. Kostal.
