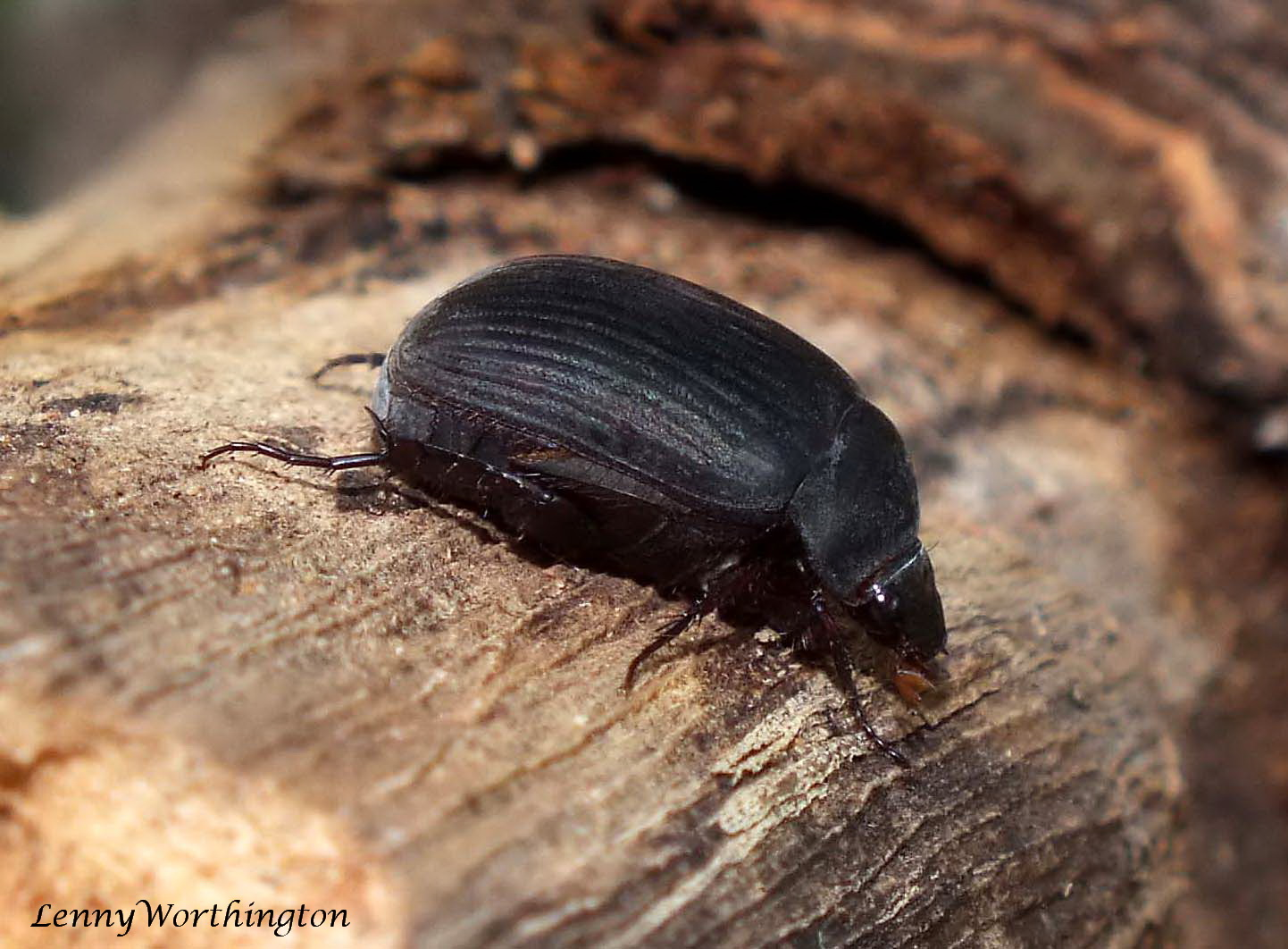

Scientific classification
- Kingdom: Animalia
- Phylum: Arthropoda
- Class: Insecta
- Order: Coleoptera
- Suborder: Polyphaga
- Infraorder: Scarabaeiformia
- Family: Scarabaeidae
- Genus: Maladera
- Species: M. fusca

Binomial name
- Maladera fusca (Frey, 1972)

Synonyms
- Autoserica fusca Frey, 1972

= Maladera fusca =

Species of beetle

Maladera fusca is a species of beetle of the family Scarabaeidae. It is found in China (Fujian, Guangdong, Guangxi, Henan, Hubei, Hunan, Jiangsu, Jiangxi), Taiwan and Vietnam.

== Description ==
Adults reach a length of about 9.6 mm. They have a dark reddish brown, oblong-oval body. The antennae are yellowish. The surface is dull (but the labroclypeus is shiny) and glabrous, except a few short setae at the margins of the pronotum and elytra.
