= Maladera invenusta =

Scientific classification
- Kingdom: Animalia
- Phylum: Arthropoda
- Clade: Pancrustacea
- Class: Insecta
- Order: Coleoptera
- Suborder: Polyphaga
- Infraorder: Scarabaeiformia
- Family: Scarabaeidae
- Genus: Maladera
- Species: M. invenusta

Binomial name
- Maladera invenusta (Moser, 1918)

Synonyms
- Autoserica invenusta Moser, 1918

Species of beetle

Maladera invenusta is a species of beetle of the family Scarabaeidae. It is found in China (Anhui, Guangxi), Taiwan, Laos and Vietnam.

== Description ==
Adults reach a length of about 6.8 mm. They have a black to blacking brown, oval body. The antennae are yellow with a brown antennal club. The dorsal surface is dull and nearly glabrous, except for some single setae on the head.
