= Maladera shenglongi =

Scientific classification
- Kingdom: Animalia
- Phylum: Arthropoda
- Class: Insecta
- Order: Coleoptera
- Suborder: Polyphaga
- Infraorder: Scarabaeiformia
- Family: Scarabaeidae
- Genus: Maladera
- Species: M. shenglongi

Binomial name
- Maladera shenglongi Ahrens, Fabrizi & Liu, 2021

Species of beetle

Maladera shenglongi is a species of beetle of the family Scarabaeidae. It is found in China (Fujian, Zhejiang).

== Description ==
Adults reach a length of about 8.1–8.6 mm. They have a dark brown, oval body, with yellowish antennae. The labroclypeus is shiny, but the remainder of the dorsal surface is dull and glabrous, except for a few long setae on the head, pronotum and elytra.

== Etymology ==
The species is named after its collector, Liu Shenglong.
