= Maladera opacifrons =

Scientific classification
- Kingdom: Animalia
- Phylum: Arthropoda
- Class: Insecta
- Order: Coleoptera
- Suborder: Polyphaga
- Infraorder: Scarabaeiformia
- Family: Scarabaeidae
- Genus: Maladera
- Species: M. opacifrons

Binomial name
- Maladera opacifrons (Fairmaire, 1891)

Synonyms
- Serica opacifrons Fairmaire, 1891

Species of beetle

Maladera opacifrons is a species of beetle of the family Scarabaeidae. It is found in China (Hubei, Sichuan).

== Description ==
Adults reach a length of about 9 mm. They have a dark brown, oblong-oval body, with yellow antennae. They are shiny and the dorsal surface is nearly glabrous.
