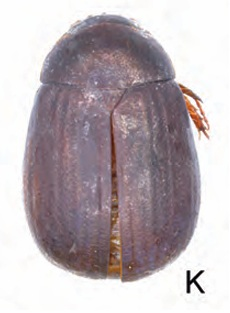

Scientific classification
- Kingdom: Animalia
- Phylum: Arthropoda
- Class: Insecta
- Order: Coleoptera
- Suborder: Polyphaga
- Infraorder: Scarabaeiformia
- Family: Scarabaeidae
- Genus: Maladera
- Species: M. propagator

Binomial name
- Maladera propagator Ahrens & Fabrizi, 2016

= Maladera propagator =

Species of beetle

Maladera propagator is a species of beetle of the family Scarabaeidae. It is found in India (Karnataka).

== Description ==
Adults reach a length of about 7.6–8 mm. They have an oval body. The dorsal and ventral surface are dark brown and the antennae are yellowish. The dorsal surface is dull and nearly glabrous, except for some setae on the head.

== Etymology ==
The species name is derived from Latin propagator (meaning propagator).
