= Maladera bakeri =

Scientific classification
- Kingdom: Animalia
- Phylum: Arthropoda
- Clade: Pancrustacea
- Class: Insecta
- Order: Coleoptera
- Suborder: Polyphaga
- Infraorder: Scarabaeiformia
- Family: Scarabaeidae
- Genus: Maladera
- Species: M. bakeri

Binomial name
- Maladera bakeri (Moser, 1915)

Synonyms
- Autoserica bakeri Moser, 1915

Species of beetle

Maladera bakeri is a species of beetle of the family Scarabaeidae. It is found in the Philippines (Palawan).

== Description ==
Adults reach a length of about 9 mm. The head is quite widely punctate. On the frons, the punctures are very fine due to the dense tomentum covering and a few setae are present beside the eyes. The antennae are brown. The pronotum is moderately densely covered with minute punctures with setae. The lateral margins and anterior margin also have setae. The elytra have regular rows of punctures, with the spaces between the hairs very slightly convex and widely punctured. The punctures are covered with tiny setae, occasionally with longer setae.
