= Maladera fengyangshanica =

Scientific classification
- Kingdom: Animalia
- Phylum: Arthropoda
- Class: Insecta
- Order: Coleoptera
- Suborder: Polyphaga
- Infraorder: Scarabaeiformia
- Family: Scarabaeidae
- Genus: Maladera
- Species: M. fengyangshanica

Binomial name
- Maladera fengyangshanica Ahrens, Fabrizi & Liu, 2021

Species of beetle

Maladera fengyangshanica is a species of beetle of the family Scarabaeidae. It is found in China (Zhejiang).

== Description ==
Adults reach a length of about 8.9 mm. They have a dark brown, oval body. The antennae are brown. The labroclypeus is weakly shiny, but the remainder of the dorsal surface is dull and glabrous.

== Etymology ==
The species is named after its type locality, the Fengyangshan mountains.
