= Maladera hsui =

Scientific classification
- Kingdom: Animalia
- Phylum: Arthropoda
- Class: Insecta
- Order: Coleoptera
- Suborder: Polyphaga
- Infraorder: Scarabaeiformia
- Family: Scarabaeidae
- Genus: Maladera
- Species: M. hsui

Binomial name
- Maladera hsui Ahrens, Fabrizi & Liu, 2021

Species of beetle

Maladera hsui is a species of beetle of the family Scarabaeidae. It is found in China (Yunnan).

== Description ==
Adults reach a length of about 9–9.6 mm. They have a short oval, dark reddish brown body, with yellow antennae.

== Etymology ==
The species is named after one of its collectors, Y.F. Hsu.
