= Maladera sparsesetosa =

Scientific classification
- Kingdom: Animalia
- Phylum: Arthropoda
- Clade: Pancrustacea
- Class: Insecta
- Order: Coleoptera
- Suborder: Polyphaga
- Infraorder: Scarabaeiformia
- Family: Scarabaeidae
- Genus: Maladera
- Species: M. sparsesetosa

Binomial name
- Maladera sparsesetosa (Moser, 1922)

Synonyms
- Autoserica sparsesetosa Moser, 1922

Species of beetle

Maladera sparsesetosa is a species of beetle of the family Scarabaeidae. It is found in the Philippines (Mindanao).

== Description ==
Adults reach a length of about 7.5 mm. They have a brown, opaque, oblong-oval body. The head, pronotum and scutellum are usually tawny, and the elytra are sometimes black. The frons is covered with few setae after the suture. The pronotum has ciliated sides and has a few suberect setae. The elytra are slightly furrowed, with punctures in the furrows.
