= Maladera shangraoensis =

Scientific classification
- Kingdom: Animalia
- Phylum: Arthropoda
- Class: Insecta
- Order: Coleoptera
- Suborder: Polyphaga
- Infraorder: Scarabaeiformia
- Family: Scarabaeidae
- Genus: Maladera
- Species: M. shangraoensis

Binomial name
- Maladera shangraoensis Ahrens, Fabrizi & Liu, 2021

Species of beetle

Maladera shangraoensis is a species of beetle of the family Scarabaeidae. It is found in China (Fujian, Jiangxi).

== Description ==
Adults reach a length of about 10.6 mm. They have a light brown, oval body, the frons with some greenish tomentum. The labroclypeus is shiny, while the remainder of the dorsal surface is dull and, except a few small setae on the head and elytra, glabrous.

== Etymology ==
The species is named after its type locality, Shangrao.
