= Maladera opaciventris =

Scientific classification
- Kingdom: Animalia
- Phylum: Arthropoda
- Clade: Pancrustacea
- Class: Insecta
- Order: Coleoptera
- Suborder: Polyphaga
- Infraorder: Scarabaeiformia
- Family: Scarabaeidae
- Genus: Maladera
- Species: M. opaciventris

Binomial name
- Maladera opaciventris (Moser, 1915)

Synonyms
- Autoserica opaciventris Moser, 1915; Eumaladera opaciventris; Aserica opaciventris; Maladera coreana Kim & Kim, 2003

Species of beetle

Maladera opaciventris is a species of beetle of the family Scarabaeidae. It is found in China (Anhui, Sichuan, Zhejiang) and Korea.

== Description ==
Adults reach a length of about 8.1 mm. They have an oblong-oval, dark reddish brown body with yellow antennae.
