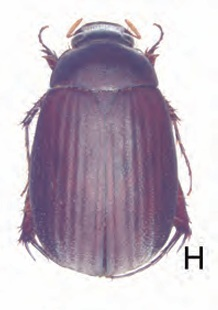

Scientific classification
- Kingdom: Animalia
- Phylum: Arthropoda
- Class: Insecta
- Order: Coleoptera
- Suborder: Polyphaga
- Infraorder: Scarabaeiformia
- Family: Scarabaeidae
- Genus: Maladera
- Species: M. tempestiva

Binomial name
- Maladera tempestiva Ahrens & Fabrizi, 2016

= Maladera tempestiva =

Species of beetle

Maladera tempestiva is a species of beetle of the family Scarabaeidae. It is found in India (Meghalaya).

== Description ==
Adults reach a length of about 10–10.9 mm. They have a dark brown, oval body. The dorsal and ventral surface are mostly dull, although the head and anterior pronotum are somewhat shiny. They are also nearly glabrous, except for the lateral setae of the elytra and pronotum.

== Etymology ==
The species name is derived from Latin tempestivus (meaning seasonal) and refers to the seasonal occurrence of the species in the pre-monsoon period (May).
