= Maladera chenzhouana =

Scientific classification
- Kingdom: Animalia
- Phylum: Arthropoda
- Class: Insecta
- Order: Coleoptera
- Suborder: Polyphaga
- Infraorder: Scarabaeiformia
- Family: Scarabaeidae
- Genus: Maladera
- Species: M. chenzhouana

Binomial name
- Maladera chenzhouana Ahrens, Fabrizi & Liu, 2021

Species of beetle

Maladera chenzhouana is a species of beetle of the family Scarabaeidae. It is found in China (Hunan).

== Description ==
Adults reach a length of about 9.5 mm. They have an oblong, blackish brown body. The antennae are yellowish and the surface is dull.

== Etymology ==
The species is named after its type locality, Chenzhou.
