= Maladera fasciculata =

Scientific classification
- Kingdom: Animalia
- Phylum: Arthropoda
- Clade: Pancrustacea
- Class: Insecta
- Order: Coleoptera
- Suborder: Polyphaga
- Infraorder: Scarabaeiformia
- Family: Scarabaeidae
- Genus: Maladera
- Species: M. fasciculata

Binomial name
- Maladera fasciculata (Moser, 1922)

Synonyms
- Autoserica fasciculata Moser, 1922

Species of beetle

Maladera fasciculata is a species of beetle of the family Scarabaeidae. It is found in the Philippines (Luzon).

== Description ==
Adults reach a length of about 9 mm. They are opaque, blackish-brown above and rufous-brown beneath. The antennae are reddish-yellow.
