= Maladera staturosa =

Scientific classification
- Kingdom: Animalia
- Phylum: Arthropoda
- Class: Insecta
- Order: Coleoptera
- Suborder: Polyphaga
- Infraorder: Scarabaeiformia
- Family: Scarabaeidae
- Genus: Maladera
- Species: M. staturosa

Binomial name
- Maladera staturosa (Brenske, 1899)

Synonyms
- Autoserica staturosa Brenske, 1899

Species of beetle

Maladera staturosa is a species of beetle of the family Scarabaeidae. It is found in Thailand.

== Description ==
Adults reach a length of about 11 mm. They are dark brown, dull, and blackish-brown above with a silky sheen. The back of the head and pronotum have a greenish sheen. The clypeus is broad, distinctly margined, the corners rounded, wrinkled-punctate, slightly convex in the middle and without setae. The pronotum is not projecting anteriorly, the sides slightly rounded anteriorly, wider posteriorly with minute hairs within the punctures. The scutellum is large. The elytra are striate in rows, the intervals raised, sparsely punctured, the first interval next to the suture distinctly wider, punctation clearly visible, with minute hairs and, at the base, more distinct, small, pale scale-like hairs. The pygidium is rounded and very densely punctate.
