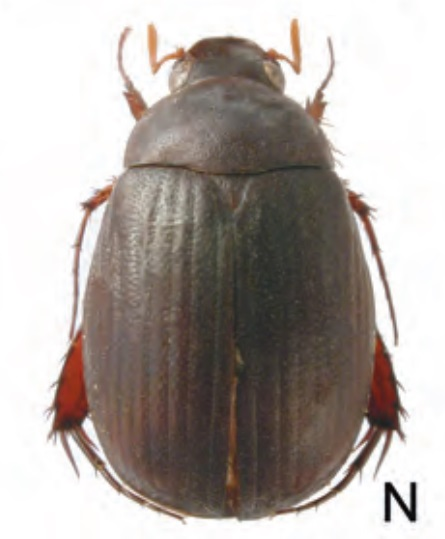

Scientific classification
- Kingdom: Animalia
- Phylum: Arthropoda
- Class: Insecta
- Order: Coleoptera
- Suborder: Polyphaga
- Infraorder: Scarabaeiformia
- Family: Scarabaeidae
- Genus: Maladera
- Species: M. siniaevi

Binomial name
- Maladera siniaevi Ahrens, 2004

= Maladera siniaevi =

Species of beetle

Maladera siniaevi is a species of beetle of the family Scarabaeidae. It is found in India (Assam, Bihar, Chhattisgarh, Madhya Pradesh, Meghalaya, Nagaland, West Bengal, Arunachal Pradesh, Sikkim), Myanmar, Bhutan and China (Xizang).

== Description ==
Adults reach a length of about 11.7–12.8 mm. They have a dark brown, oval body. The upper surface is mostly dull and glabrous, except for the lateral cilia of the pronotum and elytra.

== Etymology ==
The species is named after its collector, V. Sinaev.
