= Maladera rufonitida =

Scientific classification
- Kingdom: Animalia
- Phylum: Arthropoda
- Class: Insecta
- Order: Coleoptera
- Suborder: Polyphaga
- Infraorder: Scarabaeiformia
- Family: Scarabaeidae
- Genus: Maladera
- Species: M. rufonitida

Binomial name
- Maladera rufonitida Ahrens, Fabrizi & Liu, 2021

Species of beetle

Maladera rufonitida is a species of beetle of the family Scarabaeidae. It is found in China (Guangxi, Hunan).

== Description ==
Adults reach a length of about 8.1–8.9 mm. They have a reddish brown, oblong-oval body. The antennae are yellow. They are shiny and the dorsal surface is nearly glabrous.

== Etymology ==
The species name is derived from Latin rufus (meaning red) and nitidus (meaning shiny).
