= Maladera nagporeana =

Scientific classification
- Kingdom: Animalia
- Phylum: Arthropoda
- Class: Insecta
- Order: Coleoptera
- Suborder: Polyphaga
- Infraorder: Scarabaeiformia
- Family: Scarabaeidae
- Genus: Maladera
- Species: M. nagporeana

Binomial name
- Maladera nagporeana (Brenske, 1899)

Synonyms
- Autoserica nagporeana Brenske, 1899; Serica (Autoserica) ignorata Petrovitz, 1965

Species of beetle

Maladera nagporeana is a species of beetle of the family Scarabaeidae. It is found in Afghanistan, India (Himachal Pradesh, Uttarakhand, Karnataka, Maharashtra), Iran, Nepal and Pakistan.

== Description ==
Adults reach a length of about 7.3–8.4 mm. They have a yellowish-brown to light reddish-brown, oblong-oval body. The upper surface is shiny and glabrous, except for some setae on the head and the lateral cilia of the pronotum and elytra.
