= Maladera allemandi =

Scientific classification
- Kingdom: Animalia
- Phylum: Arthropoda
- Class: Insecta
- Order: Coleoptera
- Suborder: Polyphaga
- Infraorder: Scarabaeiformia
- Family: Scarabaeidae
- Genus: Maladera
- Species: M. allemandi

Binomial name
- Maladera allemandi Keith, 1998

Species of beetle

Maladera allemandi is a species of beetle of the family Scarabaeidae. It is found in Turkey.

== Description ==
Adults reach a length of about 8.5 mm. They have a reddish-brown, rather dull, elongate-oval body. There are coarse punctures on the clypeus. The antennal club is yellowish-brown.

== Etymology ==
The species is named after Roland Allemand.
