= Maladera vignai =

Scientific classification
- Kingdom: Animalia
- Phylum: Arthropoda
- Class: Insecta
- Order: Coleoptera
- Suborder: Polyphaga
- Infraorder: Scarabaeiformia
- Family: Scarabaeidae
- Genus: Maladera
- Species: M. vignai

Binomial name
- Maladera vignai Sabatinelli, 1977

Species of beetle

Maladera vignai is a species of beetle of the family Scarabaeidae. It is found in Turkey.

== Description ==
Adults reach a length of about 8 mm. Their body is entirely dark brown, almost black and opaque. They are almost glabrous.

== Etymology ==
The species is named after Prof. Augusto Vigna Taglianti.
