= Maladera muscula =

Scientific classification
- Kingdom: Animalia
- Phylum: Arthropoda
- Class: Insecta
- Order: Coleoptera
- Suborder: Polyphaga
- Infraorder: Scarabaeiformia
- Family: Scarabaeidae
- Genus: Maladera
- Species: M. muscula

Binomial name
- Maladera muscula (Frey, 1972)

Synonyms
- Autoserica muscula Frey, 1972

Species of beetle

Maladera muscula is a species of beetle of the family Scarabaeidae. It is found in Cambodia and Thailand.

== Description ==
Adults reach a length of about 5 mm. The upper and lower surfaces are dark reddish-brown, dull and tomentose. The clypeus is shiny and the antennae are light brown. There are a few setae beside the eye margins and on the sides of the pronotum, elytra, and at the tip of the pygidium. The rest of the upper surface is glabrous.
