= Maladera lukjanovitschi =

Scientific classification
- Kingdom: Animalia
- Phylum: Arthropoda
- Class: Insecta
- Order: Coleoptera
- Suborder: Polyphaga
- Infraorder: Scarabaeiformia
- Family: Scarabaeidae
- Genus: Maladera
- Species: M. lukjanovitschi

Binomial name
- Maladera lukjanovitschi (Medvedev, 1966)

Synonyms
- Amaladera (Omaladera) lukjanovitschi Medvedev, 1966; Maladera kaszabi Frey, 1967

Species of beetle

Maladera lukjanovitschi is a species of beetle of the family Scarabaeidae. It is found in China (Beijing, Nei Mongol, Ningxia), Mongolia and the Russian Far East.

== Description ==
Adults reach a length of about 6.2 mm. They have a yellowish brown, oblong-oval body, with yellow antennae. They are shiny and the dorsal surface is glabrous.
