= Maladera longipennis =

Scientific classification
- Kingdom: Animalia
- Phylum: Arthropoda
- Class: Insecta
- Order: Coleoptera
- Suborder: Polyphaga
- Infraorder: Scarabaeiformia
- Family: Scarabaeidae
- Genus: Maladera
- Species: M. longipennis

Binomial name
- Maladera longipennis (Verdu, Mico & Galante, 1997)

Synonyms
- Amaladera longipennis Verdu, Mico & Galante, 1997

Species of beetle

Maladera longipennis is a species of beetle of the family Scarabaeidae. It is found in Spain (Alicante).

== Description ==
Adults reach a length of about 7–9 mm. They have a black body, with a faint iridescence which is stronger on the elytra. There are sparse hairs.
