= Maladera kreyenbergi =

Scientific classification
- Kingdom: Animalia
- Phylum: Arthropoda
- Clade: Pancrustacea
- Class: Insecta
- Order: Coleoptera
- Suborder: Polyphaga
- Infraorder: Scarabaeiformia
- Family: Scarabaeidae
- Genus: Maladera
- Species: M. kreyenbergi

Binomial name
- Maladera kreyenbergi (Moser, 1918)

Synonyms
- Autoserica kreyenbergi Moser, 1918

Species of beetle

Maladera kreyenbergi is a species of beetle of the family Scarabaeidae. It is found in China (Fujian, Guizhou, Hubei, Hunan, Shandong).

== Description ==
Adults reach a length of about 8.2 mm (0.32 in). They have a dark reddish brown, oblong-oval body, with yellow antennae. They are shiny and the dorsal surface is nearly glabrous.
