= Maladera sanqingshanica =

Scientific classification
- Kingdom: Animalia
- Phylum: Arthropoda
- Class: Insecta
- Order: Coleoptera
- Suborder: Polyphaga
- Infraorder: Scarabaeiformia
- Family: Scarabaeidae
- Genus: Maladera
- Species: M. sanqingshanica

Binomial name
- Maladera sanqingshanica Ahrens, Fabrizi & Liu, 2021

Species of beetle

Maladera sanqingshanica is a species of beetle of the family Scarabaeidae. It is found in China (Fujian, Jiangxi).

== Description ==
Adults reach a length of about 7–7.8 mm. They have a dark brown, oval body. The antennae are yellow. The labroclypeus is shiny, but the remainder of the dorsal surface is dull and, except for a few small setae on the head and elytra, glabrous.

== Etymology ==
The species name refers to its type locality, Sanqingshan.
