= Maladera syriaca =

Scientific classification
- Kingdom: Animalia
- Phylum: Arthropoda
- Clade: Pancrustacea
- Class: Insecta
- Order: Coleoptera
- Suborder: Polyphaga
- Infraorder: Scarabaeiformia
- Family: Scarabaeidae
- Genus: Maladera
- Species: M. syriaca

Binomial name
- Maladera syriaca Petrovitz, 1969

Species of beetle

Maladera syriaca is a species of beetle of the family Scarabaeidae. It is found in Jordan, Israel and Syria.

== Description ==
Adults reach a length of about 9.7–10.9 mm. They have a chestnut to pitch brown, broadly oval, plump, shiny body, without a metallic sheen. The antennae and setae on the underside are light brown.

== Subspecies ==
- Maladera syriaca syriaca (Israel, Syria)
- Maladera syriaca jeraschiensis Baraud, 1990 (Jordan)
