= Maladera iuga =

Scientific classification
- Kingdom: Animalia
- Phylum: Arthropoda
- Class: Insecta
- Order: Coleoptera
- Suborder: Polyphaga
- Infraorder: Scarabaeiformia
- Family: Scarabaeidae
- Genus: Maladera
- Species: M. iuga

Binomial name
- Maladera iuga Fabrizi & Ahrens, 2014

Species of beetle

Maladera iuga is a species of beetle of the family Scarabaeidae. It is found in Sri Lanka.

== Description ==
Adults reach a length of about 8.5-9.9 mm. They have a reddish brown, oval body with a dull iridescent shine. The antennae are yellow. The dorsal surface is dull and glabrous, except for a few small setae on the head and the lateral margins of the pronotum and elytra.

== Etymology ==
The name of the species is derived from Latin iugus (meaning united) and refers to the shape of the parameres having a very short and immotile basal lobe.
