= Maladera kasigurana =

Scientific classification
- Kingdom: Animalia
- Phylum: Arthropoda
- Clade: Pancrustacea
- Class: Insecta
- Order: Coleoptera
- Suborder: Polyphaga
- Infraorder: Scarabaeiformia
- Family: Scarabaeidae
- Genus: Maladera
- Species: M. kasigurana

Binomial name
- Maladera kasigurana (Moser, 1922)

Synonyms
- Autoserica kasigurana Moser, 1922

Species of beetle

Maladera kasigurana is a species of beetle of the family Scarabaeidae. It is found in the Philippines (Luzon).

== Description ==
Adults reach a length of about 6 mm. They are rufous and opaque. The frons is sparely punctate. The pronotum is moderately densely punctate and the elytra are seriate-punctate, with the interstices slightly convex and rather sparsely punctate. The punctures are very minutely setose.
