= Maladera hansmalickyi =

Scientific classification
- Kingdom: Animalia
- Phylum: Arthropoda
- Class: Insecta
- Order: Coleoptera
- Suborder: Polyphaga
- Infraorder: Scarabaeiformia
- Family: Scarabaeidae
- Genus: Maladera
- Species: M. hansmalickyi

Binomial name
- Maladera hansmalickyi Ahrens, Fabrizi & Liu, 2021

Species of beetle

Maladera hansmalickyi is a species of beetle of the family Scarabaeidae. It is found in China (Yunnan) and Thailand.

== Description ==
Adults reach a length of about 7.9–9.4 mm. They have a yellowish brown, oblong-oval body. They are mostly dull (but the labroclypeus is shiny) and there are a few long setae on the head, pronotum and elytra.

== Etymology ==
The species is named after one of its collectors, Hans Malicky.
