= Maladera kerleyi =

Scientific classification
- Kingdom: Animalia
- Phylum: Arthropoda
- Class: Insecta
- Order: Coleoptera
- Suborder: Polyphaga
- Infraorder: Scarabaeiformia
- Family: Scarabaeidae
- Genus: Maladera
- Species: M. kerleyi

Binomial name
- Maladera kerleyi Ahrens, 2004

Species of beetle

Maladera kerleyi is a species of beetle of the family Scarabaeidae. It is found in India (Sikkim) and eastern Nepal.

== Description ==
Adults reach a length of about 7–7.7 mm. They have a yellowish-brown, elongate-oval body, although the pronotum is sometimes light reddish-brown. The upper surface is weakly iridescent, partly glossy and almost glabrous.

== Etymology ==
The species is named for M.D. Kerley.
