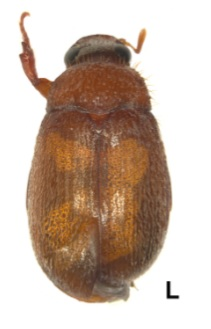

Scientific classification
- Kingdom: Animalia
- Phylum: Arthropoda
- Clade: Pancrustacea
- Class: Insecta
- Order: Coleoptera
- Suborder: Polyphaga
- Infraorder: Scarabaeiformia
- Family: Scarabaeidae
- Genus: Maladera
- Species: M. windy

Binomial name
- Maladera windy Ranasinghe et al., 2022

= Maladera windy =

Species of beetle

Maladera windy is a species of beetle of the family Scarabaeidae. It is found in Sri Lanka.

== Description ==
Adults reach a length of about 6–6.4 millimetres (0.24–0.25 in) (males) and 6.5–6.8 millimetres (0.26–0.27 in) (females). They have a short oval, yellowish-brown body. The antennae are yellow and the dorsal surface is shiny and densely finely setose.

== Etymology ==
The name of the species is derived from 'Windy Holiday Bungalow', where the research group stayed during the second expedition in Knuckles region.
