= Maladera brevis =

Scientific classification
- Kingdom: Animalia
- Phylum: Arthropoda
- Class: Insecta
- Order: Coleoptera
- Suborder: Polyphaga
- Infraorder: Scarabaeiformia
- Family: Scarabaeidae
- Genus: Maladera
- Species: M. brevis

Binomial name
- Maladera brevis (Blanchard, 1850)

Synonyms
- Omaloplia brevis Blanchard, 1850; Autoserica brevis; Autoserica chalybaea Brenske, 1898

Species of beetle

Maladera brevis is a species of beetle of the family Scarabaeidae. It is found in southern India and Sri Lanka.

== Description ==
Adults reach a length of about 7-7.3 mm. They have a blackish to dark brown, short oval body, with yellow antennae. The dorsal surface is dull (but sometimes iridescent and moderately shiny) and glabrous except for a few small setae on the head and lateral margins of the pronotum and elytra.
