= Maladera fuliginosa =

Scientific classification
- Kingdom: Animalia
- Phylum: Arthropoda
- Class: Insecta
- Order: Coleoptera
- Suborder: Polyphaga
- Infraorder: Scarabaeiformia
- Family: Scarabaeidae
- Genus: Maladera
- Species: M. fuliginosa

Binomial name
- Maladera fuliginosa (Burmeister, 1855)

Synonyms
- Serica fuliginosa Burmeister, 1855; Autoserica fuliginosa; Serica javana Harold, 1869

Species of beetle

Maladera fuliginosa is a species of beetle of the family Scarabaeidae. It is found in Indonesia (Java).

== Description ==
Adults reach a length of about 10 mm. They are elongate (more cylindrical than oval) and dull above. They are blood-reddish-brown, with the raised striae of the elytra blackened. The under surface is glossy and yellowish-red brown. The elytra are striate, with a row of punctures in the furrows.
