= Maladera trichotibialis =

Scientific classification
- Kingdom: Animalia
- Phylum: Arthropoda
- Class: Insecta
- Order: Coleoptera
- Suborder: Polyphaga
- Infraorder: Scarabaeiformia
- Family: Scarabaeidae
- Genus: Maladera
- Species: M. trichotibialis

Binomial name
- Maladera trichotibialis Ahrens, 2004

Species of beetle

Maladera trichotibialis is a species of beetle of the family Scarabaeidae. It is found in Bhutan and India (West Bengal).

== Description ==
Adults reach a length of about 8.6 mm. They have a yellowish-brown, oblong-oval body. The upper surface is dull to iridescent and densely covered with hairs on some areas.

== Etymology ==
The species name is derived from Latin tricho- (meaning hair) and tibialis.
