= Maladera songi =

Scientific classification
- Kingdom: Animalia
- Phylum: Arthropoda
- Class: Insecta
- Order: Coleoptera
- Suborder: Polyphaga
- Infraorder: Scarabaeiformia
- Family: Scarabaeidae
- Genus: Maladera
- Species: M. songi

Binomial name
- Maladera songi Ahrens, Fabrizi & Liu, 2021

Species of beetle

Maladera songi is a species of beetle of the family Scarabaeidae. It is found in China (Hainan).

== Description ==
Adults reach a length of about 10.1–10.6 mm. They have a dark reddish brown, oblong-oval body. The antennae are yellow. The labroclypeus is shiny, but the dorsal surface is dull and nearly glabrous.

== Etymology ==
The species is named after one of its collectors, Song Shimei.
