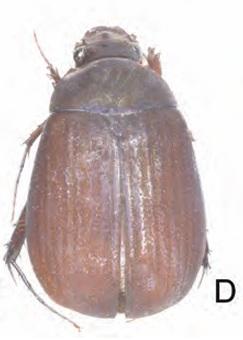

Scientific classification
- Kingdom: Animalia
- Phylum: Arthropoda
- Class: Insecta
- Order: Coleoptera
- Suborder: Polyphaga
- Infraorder: Scarabaeiformia
- Family: Scarabaeidae
- Genus: Maladera
- Species: M. schoenwitzae

Binomial name
- Maladera schoenwitzae Ahrens & Fabrizi, 2016

= Maladera schoenwitzae =

Species of beetle

Maladera schoenwitzae is a species of beetle of the family Scarabaeidae. It is found in India (Kerala).

== Description ==
Adults reach a length of about 12.5 mm. They have a dark reddish brown, oblong-oval body. The dorsal and ventral surface are dull and, except for the lateral setae of the elytra and pronotum, nearly glabrous.

== Etymology ==
The species is named in honour of Dr. Roswitha Schönwitz, program director of the German Research Foundation.
