= Maladera hongyuanensis =

Scientific classification
- Kingdom: Animalia
- Phylum: Arthropoda
- Class: Insecta
- Order: Coleoptera
- Suborder: Polyphaga
- Infraorder: Scarabaeiformia
- Family: Scarabaeidae
- Genus: Maladera
- Species: M. hongyuanensis

Binomial name
- Maladera hongyuanensis Ahrens, Fabrizi & Liu, 2021

Species of beetle

Maladera hongyuanensis is a species of beetle of the family Scarabaeidae. It is found in China (Shaanxi, Sichuan).

== Description ==
Adults reach a length of about 7.8–9.7 mm. They have a blackish brown, oblong body. The antennae are yellow and the dorsal surface is dull and densely setose on the head, while the remainder is almost glabrous.

== Etymology ==
The species name refers to its type locality, Hongyuan.
