= Maladera stricta =

Scientific classification
- Kingdom: Animalia
- Phylum: Arthropoda
- Class: Insecta
- Order: Coleoptera
- Suborder: Polyphaga
- Infraorder: Scarabaeiformia
- Family: Scarabaeidae
- Genus: Maladera
- Species: M. stricta

Binomial name
- Maladera stricta (Brenske, 1899)

Synonyms
- Autoserica stricta Brenske, 1899

Species of beetle

Maladera stricta is a species of beetle of the family Scarabaeidae. It is found in Indonesia (Java).

== Description ==
Adults reach a length of about 5.5–6 mm. They are short, very dull and dark with a greenish tinge and strongly silky-shimmering without an opalescent sheen. The sides of the pronotum are straight, the hind angles sharp, the marginal setae weak and the punctation is fine, with minute hairs. The elytra are densely and strongly punctate in the striae, with the intervals narrow and smooth and with minute hairs in the punctures.
