= Maladera rubriventris =

Scientific classification
- Kingdom: Animalia
- Phylum: Arthropoda
- Class: Insecta
- Order: Coleoptera
- Suborder: Polyphaga
- Infraorder: Scarabaeiformia
- Family: Scarabaeidae
- Genus: Maladera
- Species: M. rubriventris

Binomial name
- Maladera rubriventris Ahrens, Fabrizi & Liu, 2021

Species of beetle

Maladera rubriventris is a species of beetle of the family Scarabaeidae. It is found in China (Yunnan).

== Description ==
Adults reach a length of about 9–11.3 mm. They have a dark reddish brown, elongate body. The antennae are yellow. The dorsal surface is dull and, except for a few small setae on the head and elytra, glabrous.

== Etymology ==
The species name is derived from Latin rubis (meaning red) and venter (meaning belley or ventral side) and refers to the reddish colour of the ventral surface.
