= Maladera ekisi =

Scientific classification
- Kingdom: Animalia
- Phylum: Arthropoda
- Class: Insecta
- Order: Coleoptera
- Suborder: Polyphaga
- Infraorder: Scarabaeiformia
- Family: Scarabaeidae
- Genus: Maladera
- Species: M. ekisi

Binomial name
- Maladera ekisi Fabrizi & Ahrens, 2014

Species of beetle

Maladera ekisi is a species of beetle of the family Scarabaeidae. It is found in Sri Lanka.

== Description ==
Adults reach a length of about 6.5-6.9 mm. They have a yellowish brown, oblong-oval body. The dorsal surface is dull and glabrous, except for a few small setae on the head and the lateral margins of the pronotum and elytra.

== Etymology ==
The species is named after its collector Ginter Ekis.
