= Maladera tianqiae =

Scientific classification
- Kingdom: Animalia
- Phylum: Arthropoda
- Class: Insecta
- Order: Coleoptera
- Suborder: Polyphaga
- Infraorder: Scarabaeiformia
- Family: Scarabaeidae
- Genus: Maladera
- Species: M. tianqiae

Binomial name
- Maladera tianqiae Liu, Ahrens, Li & Yang, 2024

Species of beetle

Maladera tianqiae is a species of beetle of the family Scarabaeidae. It is found in China (Guangdong).

== Description ==
Adults reach a length of about 11.9–12.5 mm. They have a reddish brown, wide, oval body, with some iridescent shine and yellowish brown antennae. The dorsal surface is mostly dull and glabrous.

== Etymology ==
The species is named after its collector, Ms. Shi Tianqi.
