= Maladera flinti =

Scientific classification
- Kingdom: Animalia
- Phylum: Arthropoda
- Class: Insecta
- Order: Coleoptera
- Suborder: Polyphaga
- Infraorder: Scarabaeiformia
- Family: Scarabaeidae
- Genus: Maladera
- Species: M. flinti

Binomial name
- Maladera flinti Fabrizi & Ahrens, 2014

Species of beetle

Maladera flinti is a species of beetle of the family Scarabaeidae. It is found in Sri Lanka.

== Description ==
Adults reach a length of about 7.2–8.6 mm. They have a dark reddish brown, short oval body, with yellow antennae. The dorsal surface is shiny and densely and finely setose.

== Etymology ==
The species is named after its collector, O. S. Flint Jr.
