= Maladera hubeiensis =

Scientific classification
- Kingdom: Animalia
- Phylum: Arthropoda
- Class: Insecta
- Order: Coleoptera
- Suborder: Polyphaga
- Infraorder: Scarabaeiformia
- Family: Scarabaeidae
- Genus: Maladera
- Species: M. hubeiensis

Binomial name
- Maladera hubeiensis Ahrens, Fabrizi & Liu, 2021

Species of beetle

Maladera hubeiensis is a species of beetle of the family Scarabaeidae. It is found in China (Hubei).

== Description ==
Adults reach a length of about 9.6 mm. They have a dark brown, oval body, with the antennae yellow. They are mostly dull, but the elytra and labroclypeus are shiny. The dorsal surface is nearly glabrous.

== Etymology ==
The species name refers to its occurrence in Hubei province.
