= Maladera panyuensis =

Scientific classification
- Kingdom: Animalia
- Phylum: Arthropoda
- Class: Insecta
- Order: Coleoptera
- Suborder: Polyphaga
- Infraorder: Scarabaeiformia
- Family: Scarabaeidae
- Genus: Maladera
- Species: M. panyuensis

Binomial name
- Maladera panyuensis Ahrens, Fabrizi & Liu, 2021

Species of beetle

Maladera panyuensis is a species of beetle of the family Scarabaeidae. It is found in China (Guangdong, Guangxi, Hainan, Sichuan, Yunnan) and Thailand.

== Description ==
Adults reach a length of about 6.6–7.6 mm. They have a dark reddish brown, oval body, with brown antennae. The labroclypeus is shiny, but the remainder of the dorsal surface is dull and, except a few small setae on the head and elytra, glabrous.

== Etymology ==
The species is named after its type locality, Panyu.
