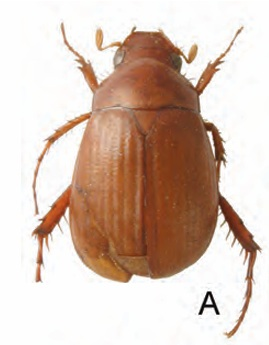

Scientific classification
- Kingdom: Animalia
- Phylum: Arthropoda
- Class: Insecta
- Order: Coleoptera
- Suborder: Polyphaga
- Infraorder: Scarabaeiformia
- Family: Scarabaeidae
- Genus: Maladera
- Species: M. polunini

Binomial name
- Maladera polunini Ahrens, 2004

= Maladera polunini =

Species of beetle

Maladera polunini is a species of beetle of the family Scarabaeidae. It is found in Nepal.

== Description ==
Adults reach a length of about 6.6 mm. They have a yellowish brown, oval body. The upper surface is somewhat iridescently, weakly shiny and glabrous, except for some setae on the head and the lateral cilia of the pronotum and elytra.

== Etymology ==
The species is named for its collector, O. Polunin.
