= Maladera kaohsiungensis =

Scientific classification
- Kingdom: Animalia
- Phylum: Arthropoda
- Class: Insecta
- Order: Coleoptera
- Suborder: Polyphaga
- Infraorder: Scarabaeiformia
- Family: Scarabaeidae
- Genus: Maladera
- Species: M. kaohsiungensis

Binomial name
- Maladera kaohsiungensis Kobayashi, 2023

Synonyms
- Maladera liukueiensis Kobayashi, 2022 (preocc.)

Species of beetle

Maladera kaohsiungensis is a species of beetle of the family Scarabaeidae. It is found in Taiwan.

== Description ==
Adults reach a length of about 9–10.5 mm. They have an elongate-oval, dark reddish brown to blackish brown body, with yellowish brown antennae. The ventral surface and legs are reddish brown to dark reddish brown. The dorsal and ventral sides are almost opaque, but the legs are mostly shining.

== Etymology ==
The original species name, Maladera liukueiensis, referred to the type locality, Liukuei, South Taiwan.
