= Maladera frischi =

Scientific classification
- Kingdom: Animalia
- Phylum: Arthropoda
- Class: Insecta
- Order: Coleoptera
- Suborder: Polyphaga
- Infraorder: Scarabaeiformia
- Family: Scarabaeidae
- Genus: Maladera
- Species: M. frischi

Binomial name
- Maladera frischi Keith, 2011

Species of beetle

Maladera frischi is a species of beetle of the family Scarabaeidae. It is found in Iran.

== Description ==
Adults reach a length of about 7.5 mm. They have a black, elongate body. The antennae are distinctly pale. The upper surface is glabrous.

== Etymology ==
The species is named after one of its collectors, Dr. Johannes Frisch.
