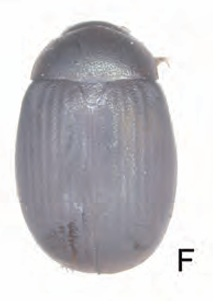

Scientific classification
- Kingdom: Animalia
- Phylum: Arthropoda
- Class: Insecta
- Order: Coleoptera
- Suborder: Polyphaga
- Infraorder: Scarabaeiformia
- Family: Scarabaeidae
- Genus: Maladera
- Species: M. excisiceps

Binomial name
- Maladera excisiceps (Frey, 1972)

Synonyms
- Autoserica excisiceps Frey, 1972

= Maladera (Maladera) excisiceps =

Species of beetle

Maladera excisiceps is a species of beetle of the family Scarabaeidae. It is found in India (Kerala, Tamil Nadu).

== Description ==
Adults reach a length of about 7.5 mm. They have an oval body. The dorsal and ventral surface are dark brown and the antennae are yellowish. The dorsal surface is dull and nearly glabrous, except for some setae on the head.
