= Maladera bismarckiana =

Scientific classification
- Kingdom: Animalia
- Phylum: Arthropoda
- Class: Insecta
- Order: Coleoptera
- Suborder: Polyphaga
- Infraorder: Scarabaeiformia
- Family: Scarabaeidae
- Genus: Maladera
- Species: M. bismarckiana

Binomial name
- Maladera bismarckiana (Brenske, 1899)

Synonyms
- Autoserica bismarckiana Brenske, 1899

Species of beetle

Maladera bismarckiana is a species of beetle of the family Scarabaeidae. It is found in Indonesia (Sumatra).

== Description ==
Adults reach a length of about 13–14 mm. They are uniformly reddish-brown, dull and silky, without an opalescent sheen. The clypeus is broad, tapering slightly towards the front, with broadly rounded corners, a slightly raised, gently indented anterior margin, densely and rather coarsely, somewhat wrinkledly punctate, without any elevation. The suture is very fine, angled posteriorly, the tomentum begins behind it. The pronotum is almost straight at the sides, with right-angled posterior corners. The anterior margin is deeply indented, projecting again in the middle, the corners therefore very strong. The surface is strongly but extensively punctate, with a punctate-free longitudinal line in the middle. The marginal setae are weak. The scutellum is long and pointed. On the elytra (whose sides are almost parallel), coarse punctures are densely intertwined in the striae. The striae are narrow, especially the first ones next to the suture are depressed. The interstices, which are sparsely punctured, are broad and only slightly raised. The pygidium is slightly pointed and densely punctured.
