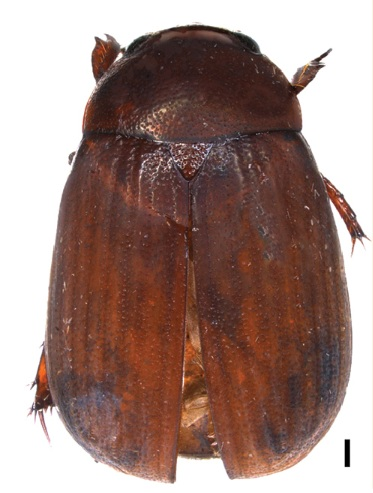

Scientific classification
- Kingdom: Animalia
- Phylum: Arthropoda
- Class: Insecta
- Order: Coleoptera
- Suborder: Polyphaga
- Infraorder: Scarabaeiformia
- Family: Scarabaeidae
- Genus: Maladera
- Species: M. kolasibensis

Binomial name
- Maladera kolasibensis Sreedevi, Speer, Fabrizi & Ahrens, 2018

= Maladera kolasibensis =

Species of beetle

Maladera kolasibensis is a species of beetle of the family Scarabaeidae. It is found in India (Mizoram).

== Description ==
Adults reach a length of about 9.9 mm. They have a dark reddish brown, oval body. The dorsal surface is dull, but the labroclypeus shiny. They are nearly glabrous, except for some single setae on the dorsal surface of the head.

== Etymology ==
The species is named after the type locality, Kolasib.
