= Maladera boettcheri =

Scientific classification
- Kingdom: Animalia
- Phylum: Arthropoda
- Clade: Pancrustacea
- Class: Insecta
- Order: Coleoptera
- Suborder: Polyphaga
- Infraorder: Scarabaeiformia
- Family: Scarabaeidae
- Genus: Maladera
- Species: M. boettcheri

Binomial name
- Maladera boettcheri (Moser, 1926)

Synonyms
- Cephaloserica boettcheri Moser, 1926

Species of beetle

Maladera boettcheri is a species of beetle of the family Scarabaeidae. It is found in the Philippines (Luzon).

== Description ==
Adults reach a length of about 8 mm. They are brown, with the prothorax darker. The head is sparsely punctate, with few setose spots.
