= Maladera tranquebarica =

Scientific classification
- Kingdom: Animalia
- Phylum: Arthropoda
- Class: Insecta
- Order: Coleoptera
- Suborder: Polyphaga
- Infraorder: Scarabaeiformia
- Family: Scarabaeidae
- Genus: Maladera
- Species: M. tranquebarica

Binomial name
- Maladera tranquebarica (Brenske, 1899)

Synonyms
- Autoserica tranquebarica Brenske, 1899

Species of beetle

Maladera tranquebarica is a species of beetle of the family Scarabaeidae. It is found in India (Kerala, Tamil Nadu).

== Description ==
Adults reach a length of about 7.8 mm. They are dark brown (almost cherry-reddish-brown), very dull and without an opalescent sheen. The pronotum is projecting anteriorly, straight at the sides, widening posteriorly, the hind angles angular. The elytra are broadly and irregularly punctate in the striae, minutely pubescent, the intervals are narrow, unpunctate, slightly raised, the fine hairs are somewhat more distinct at the base and on the scutellum. The pygidium is almost rounded and the setate rows on the abdominal segments are very indistinct and weak.
