= Maladera zhanchaoi =

Scientific classification
- Kingdom: Animalia
- Phylum: Arthropoda
- Class: Insecta
- Order: Coleoptera
- Suborder: Polyphaga
- Infraorder: Scarabaeiformia
- Family: Scarabaeidae
- Genus: Maladera
- Species: M. zhanchaoi

Binomial name
- Maladera zhanchaoi Zhao & Ahrens, 2023

Species of beetle

Maladera zhanchaoi is a species of beetle of the family Scarabaeidae. It is found in China (Guizhou).

== Description ==
Adults reach a length of about 12.2–12.6 mm. They have a reddish brown and iridescent, ovoid body. The elytra, abdomen, and legs are iridescent. The antennae and legs are reddish brown.

== Etymology ==
The species is dedicated to Mr. Chao Zhan, the father of Mr. Bao-Xiang Zhan.
