= Maladera modesta =

Scientific classification
- Kingdom: Animalia
- Phylum: Arthropoda
- Clade: Pancrustacea
- Class: Insecta
- Order: Coleoptera
- Suborder: Polyphaga
- Infraorder: Scarabaeiformia
- Family: Scarabaeidae
- Genus: Maladera
- Species: M. modesta

Binomial name
- Maladera modesta (Fairmaire, 1881)

Synonyms
- Serica modesta Fairmaire, 1881; Serica pertusa Fairmaire, 1881

Species of beetle

Maladera modesta is a species of beetle of the family Scarabaeidae. It is found in Egypt, Israel and Syria.

== Description ==
Adults reach a length of about 7 mm. They have an entirely reddish-brown, shiny, glabrous, elongate-oval body, without a metallic sheen.
