= Maladera shaluishanica =

Scientific classification
- Kingdom: Animalia
- Phylum: Arthropoda
- Class: Insecta
- Order: Coleoptera
- Suborder: Polyphaga
- Infraorder: Scarabaeiformia
- Family: Scarabaeidae
- Genus: Maladera
- Species: M. shaluishanica

Binomial name
- Maladera shaluishanica Ahrens, Fabrizi & Liu, 2021

Species of beetle

Maladera shaluishanica is a species of beetle of the family Scarabaeidae. It is found in China (Sichuan).

== Description ==
Adults reach a length of about 7.7–8.5 mm. They have a dark brown, oblong body. The antennae are yellow and the dorsal surface is moderately shiny and almost glabrous.

== Etymology ==
The species name refers to its type locality, Shalui Shan.
