= Maladera varia =

Scientific classification
- Kingdom: Animalia
- Phylum: Arthropoda
- Class: Insecta
- Order: Coleoptera
- Suborder: Polyphaga
- Infraorder: Scarabaeiformia
- Family: Scarabaeidae
- Genus: Maladera
- Species: M. varia

Binomial name
- Maladera varia (Brenske, 1899)

Synonyms
- Autoserica varia Brenske, 1899

Species of beetle

Maladera varia is a species of beetle of the family Scarabaeidae. It is found in Myanmar.

== Description ==
Adults reach a length of about 5–6 mm. They are dull, slightly opalescent, with a red thorax and the elytra black spotted with yellow. The clypeus is rather broad, straight at the sides, slightly wavy anteriorly and finely punctate. The pronotum is straight at the sides, the lateral margin sharply demarcated with distinct setae, the posterior angles are sharply right-angled, the surface is sparsely rather than densely punctate, with a minute hair in each puncture. The scutellum is elongate. The elytra are narrowly striated, the punctures in the striations are fine and form irregular, punctate rows, the intervals are unpunctate and slightly raised. The apical seta is quite distinct. At the suture, on each side, are two yellowish, roundish spots, and next to the posterior one, towards the lateral margin, is another slightly bulging spot. In the anterior half of the lateral margin, an inwardly forked spot branches off, sending one branch towards the base around the anterior spot, the other branch backwards along the fourth interval. The pygidium is somewhat pointed.
