= Maladera iridicauda =

Scientific classification
- Kingdom: Animalia
- Phylum: Arthropoda
- Class: Insecta
- Order: Coleoptera
- Suborder: Polyphaga
- Infraorder: Scarabaeiformia
- Family: Scarabaeidae
- Genus: Maladera
- Species: M. iridicauda

Binomial name
- Maladera iridicauda (Fairmaire, 1893)

Synonyms
- Serica iridicauda Fairmaire, 1893

Species of beetle

Maladera iridicauda is a species of beetle of the family Scarabaeidae. It is found in Vietnam.

== Description ==
Adults reach a length of about 10 mm. They are black, slightly dull and very strongly opalescent. The clypeus is broad, the corners broadly rounded, slightly marginate, very dull and finely punctate with scattered setae, and with the suture quite indistinct. The pronotum is almost straight at the sides, with angular hind angles, rather strongly but not densely punctate. The scutellum is large, broad and pointed. The elytra are densely, coarsely, irregularly punctate in the striae, the intervals strongly raised and unpunctate. The pygidium is pointed and densely punctate.
