= Maladera gansuensis =

Scientific classification
- Kingdom: Animalia
- Phylum: Arthropoda
- Class: Insecta
- Order: Coleoptera
- Suborder: Polyphaga
- Infraorder: Scarabaeiformia
- Family: Scarabaeidae
- Genus: Maladera
- Species: M. gansuensis

Binomial name
- Maladera gansuensis (Miyake & Yamaya, 2001)

Synonyms
- Serica gansuensis Miyake & Yamaya, 2001

Species of beetle

Maladera gansuensis is a species of beetle of the family Scarabaeidae. It is found in China (Gansu, Ningxia, Sichuan, Yunnan).

== Description ==
Adults reach a length of about 8.5 mm. They have a reddish brown, oblong body. The antennae are yellow and the dorsal surface is dull and almost glabrous.
