= Maladera espagnoli =

Scientific classification
- Kingdom: Animalia
- Phylum: Arthropoda
- Class: Insecta
- Order: Coleoptera
- Suborder: Polyphaga
- Infraorder: Scarabaeiformia
- Family: Scarabaeidae
- Genus: Maladera
- Species: M. espagnoli

Binomial name
- Maladera espagnoli Baraud, 1964

Synonyms
- Amaladera espagnoli Baraud, 1964

Species of beetle

Maladera espagnoli is a species of beetle of the family Scarabaeidae. It is found in Spain.

== Description ==
Adults reach a length of about 7-7.5 mm. They have a dark brown, slightly reddish body. The tarsi and antennae are lighter. The dorsal surface is nearly glabrous, except for a few hairs along the margins of the pronotum and elytra.
