= Maladera liaochengensis =

Scientific classification
- Kingdom: Animalia
- Phylum: Arthropoda
- Class: Insecta
- Order: Coleoptera
- Suborder: Polyphaga
- Infraorder: Scarabaeiformia
- Family: Scarabaeidae
- Genus: Maladera
- Species: M. liaochengensis

Binomial name
- Maladera liaochengensis Ahrens, Fabrizi & Liu, 2021

Species of beetle

Maladera liaochengensis is a species of beetle of the family Scarabaeidae. It is found in China (Guangdong, Liaoning, Shandong).

== Description ==
Adults reach a length of about 7.3–8.2 mm. They have a yellowish brown, oblong-oval body. The antennae are yellow. They are shiny and the dorsal surface is nearly glabrous.

== Etymology ==
The species is named after the type locality, Liaocheng.
