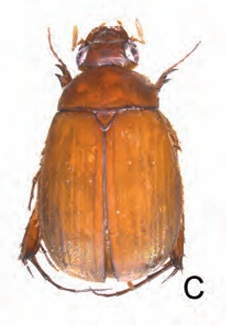

Scientific classification
- Kingdom: Animalia
- Phylum: Arthropoda
- Class: Insecta
- Order: Coleoptera
- Suborder: Polyphaga
- Infraorder: Scarabaeiformia
- Family: Scarabaeidae
- Genus: Maladera
- Species: M. sunaiensis

Binomial name
- Maladera sunaiensis Ahrens & Fabrizi, 2016

= Maladera sunaiensis =

Species of beetle

Maladera sunaiensis is a species of beetle of the family Scarabaeidae. It is found in India (Tamil Nadu).

== Description ==
Adults reach a length of about 7–8.1 mm. They have a reddish-brown, oblong-oval body, with the elytra slightly lighter and yellowish antennae. The dorsal surface is mostly dull and glabrous, except for a few short setae on the sides of the elytra.

== Etymology ==
The species name refers to its type locality, Sunai.
