= Maladera secreta =

Scientific classification
- Kingdom: Animalia
- Phylum: Arthropoda
- Class: Insecta
- Order: Coleoptera
- Suborder: Polyphaga
- Infraorder: Scarabaeiformia
- Family: Scarabaeidae
- Genus: Maladera
- Species: M. secreta

Binomial name
- Maladera secreta (Brenske, 1898)

Synonyms
- Autoserica secreta Brenske, 1898; Maladera cruralis Ahrens, 2006; Autoserica takaoana Niijima & Kinoshita, 1927; Autoserica uyei Niijima & Kinoshita, 1927

Species of beetle

Maladera secreta is a species of beetle of the family Scarabaeidae. It is found in China (Fujian, Guangdong, Hubei, Jiangxi, Shaanxi, Sichuan, Zhejiang), Taiwan, Japan and Vietnam.

== Description ==
Adults reach a length of about 9.1 mm. They have an oblong, reddish brown body. The antennae are yellowish and the surface is dull.

== Subspecies ==
- Maladera secreta secreta (China [Fujian, Guangdong, Hubei, Jiangxi, Shaanxi, Sichuan, Zhejiang], Japan, Vietnam)
- Maladera secreta horaiana Nomura, 1974 (Taiwan)
