= Maladera motschulskyi =

Scientific classification
- Kingdom: Animalia
- Phylum: Arthropoda
- Class: Insecta
- Order: Coleoptera
- Suborder: Polyphaga
- Infraorder: Scarabaeiformia
- Family: Scarabaeidae
- Genus: Maladera
- Species: M. motschulskyi

Binomial name
- Maladera motschulskyi (Brenske, 1897)

Synonyms
- Serica motschulskyi Brenske, 1898; Maladera schonfeldti Stebnicka, 1980; Serica schoenfeldti Murayama, 1937; Autoserica furcillata Brenske, 1898

Species of beetle

Maladera motschulskyi is a species of beetle of the family Scarabaeidae. It is found in China (Fujian, Hubei, Zhejiang) and Korea.

== Description ==
Adults reach a length of about 8.5 mm. They have an oblong, blackish brown body, with yellowish antennae and a dull surface.
