= Maladera krueperi =

Scientific classification
- Kingdom: Animalia
- Phylum: Arthropoda
- Clade: Pancrustacea
- Class: Insecta
- Order: Coleoptera
- Suborder: Polyphaga
- Infraorder: Scarabaeiformia
- Family: Scarabaeidae
- Genus: Maladera
- Species: M. krueperi

Binomial name
- Maladera krueperi Petrovitz, 1969

Species of beetle

Maladera krueperi is a species of beetle of the family Scarabaeidae. It is found in Greece.

== Description ==
Adults reach a length of about 8.6–9.7 mm (males) and 9.7–9.8 mm (females). They have a dark brown to black, narrowly ovate, moderately shiny body, with a distinct metallic sheen. The antennae are light reddish-brown.
