= Maladera taiwanensis =

Scientific classification
- Kingdom: Animalia
- Phylum: Arthropoda
- Class: Insecta
- Order: Coleoptera
- Suborder: Polyphaga
- Infraorder: Scarabaeiformia
- Family: Scarabaeidae
- Genus: Maladera
- Species: M. taiwanensis

Binomial name
- Maladera taiwanensis Kobayashi, 2022

Species of beetle

Maladera taiwanensis is a species of beetle of the family Scarabaeidae. It is found in Taiwan.

== Description ==
They have an elongate oval body. The dorsal and ventral surfaces are entirely black. The antennae are reddish brown. The dorsal and ventral sides are almost opaque, while the legs are shining.

== Etymology ==
The species is named after its wide distribution in Taiwan.
