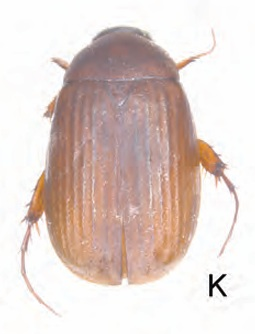

Scientific classification
- Kingdom: Animalia
- Phylum: Arthropoda
- Class: Insecta
- Order: Coleoptera
- Suborder: Polyphaga
- Infraorder: Scarabaeiformia
- Family: Scarabaeidae
- Genus: Maladera
- Species: M. constans

Binomial name
- Maladera constans Ahrens & Fabrizi, 2016

= Maladera constans =

Species of beetle

Maladera constans is a species of beetle of the family Scarabaeidae. It is found in India (Karnataka, Kerala, Tamil Nadu).

== Description ==
Adults reach a length of about 7.2–8.1 mm. They have a reddish brown, oblong-oval body with yellowish antennae. They are mostly dull and the dorsal surface is nearly glabrous, except for some setae on the head.

== Etymology ==
The species name is derived from Latin constans (meaning constant).
