= Maladera nigrorubra =

Scientific classification
- Kingdom: Animalia
- Phylum: Arthropoda
- Class: Insecta
- Order: Coleoptera
- Suborder: Polyphaga
- Infraorder: Scarabaeiformia
- Family: Scarabaeidae
- Genus: Maladera
- Species: M. nigrorubra

Binomial name
- Maladera nigrorubra (Brenske, 1894)

Synonyms
- Serica nigrorubra Brenske, 1894

Species of beetle

Maladera nigrorubra is a species of beetle of the family Scarabaeidae. It is found in the Philippines.

== Description ==
Adults reach a length of about 8–9 mm. They are deep cherry red, dull and somewhat opalescent, but lighter and slightly lustrous underneath.
