= Maladera bhutanensis =

Scientific classification
- Kingdom: Animalia
- Phylum: Arthropoda
- Class: Insecta
- Order: Coleoptera
- Suborder: Polyphaga
- Infraorder: Scarabaeiformia
- Family: Scarabaeidae
- Genus: Maladera
- Species: M. bhutanensis

Binomial name
- Maladera bhutanensis (Frey, 1975)

Synonyms
- Autoserica bhutanensis Frey, 1975; Lasioserica lata Frey, 1975

Species of beetle

Maladera bhutanensis is a species of beetle of the family Scarabaeidae. It is found in India (Mizoram) and Bhutan.

== Description ==
Adults reach a length of about 8.4–8.8 mm. They have a dark brown, oval body. The lateral margins of the pronotum and the underside are reddish-brown. The upper surface is mostly dull and glabrous, except for some setae on the head and the lateral cilia of the pronotum and elytra.
