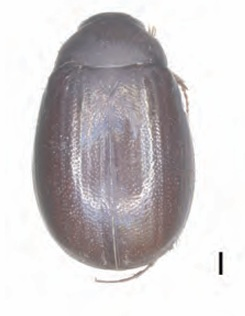

Scientific classification
- Kingdom: Animalia
- Phylum: Arthropoda
- Clade: Pancrustacea
- Class: Insecta
- Order: Coleoptera
- Suborder: Polyphaga
- Infraorder: Scarabaeiformia
- Family: Scarabaeidae
- Genus: Maladera
- Species: M. nigromicans

Binomial name
- Maladera nigromicans (Frey, 1973)

Synonyms
- Autoserica nigromicans Frey, 1973

= Maladera nigromicans =

Species of beetle

Maladera nigromicans is a species of beetle in the family Scarabaeidae. It is found in India (Karnataka, Kerala).

== Description ==
Adults reach a length of about 9 mm. They have a dark brown, oblong-oval body with yellowish antennae. They are shiny and the dorsal surface is nearly glabrous, except for some setae on the head.
