= Maladera flavipennis =

Scientific classification
- Kingdom: Animalia
- Phylum: Arthropoda
- Class: Insecta
- Order: Coleoptera
- Suborder: Polyphaga
- Infraorder: Scarabaeiformia
- Family: Scarabaeidae
- Genus: Maladera
- Species: M. flavipennis

Binomial name
- Maladera flavipennis Ahrens, Fabrizi & Liu, 2021

Species of beetle

Maladera flavipennis is a species of beetle of the family Scarabaeidae. It is found in China (Guizhou).

== Description ==
Adults reach a length of about 9.5–10.2 mm. They have an oval body. The head, legs and ventral surface are black, while the pronotum, elytra and antennae are yellowish brown. The dorsal surface is shiny and glabrous.

== Etymology ==
The species name is derived from Latin flavus (meaning yellow) and pennes (meaning wings).
