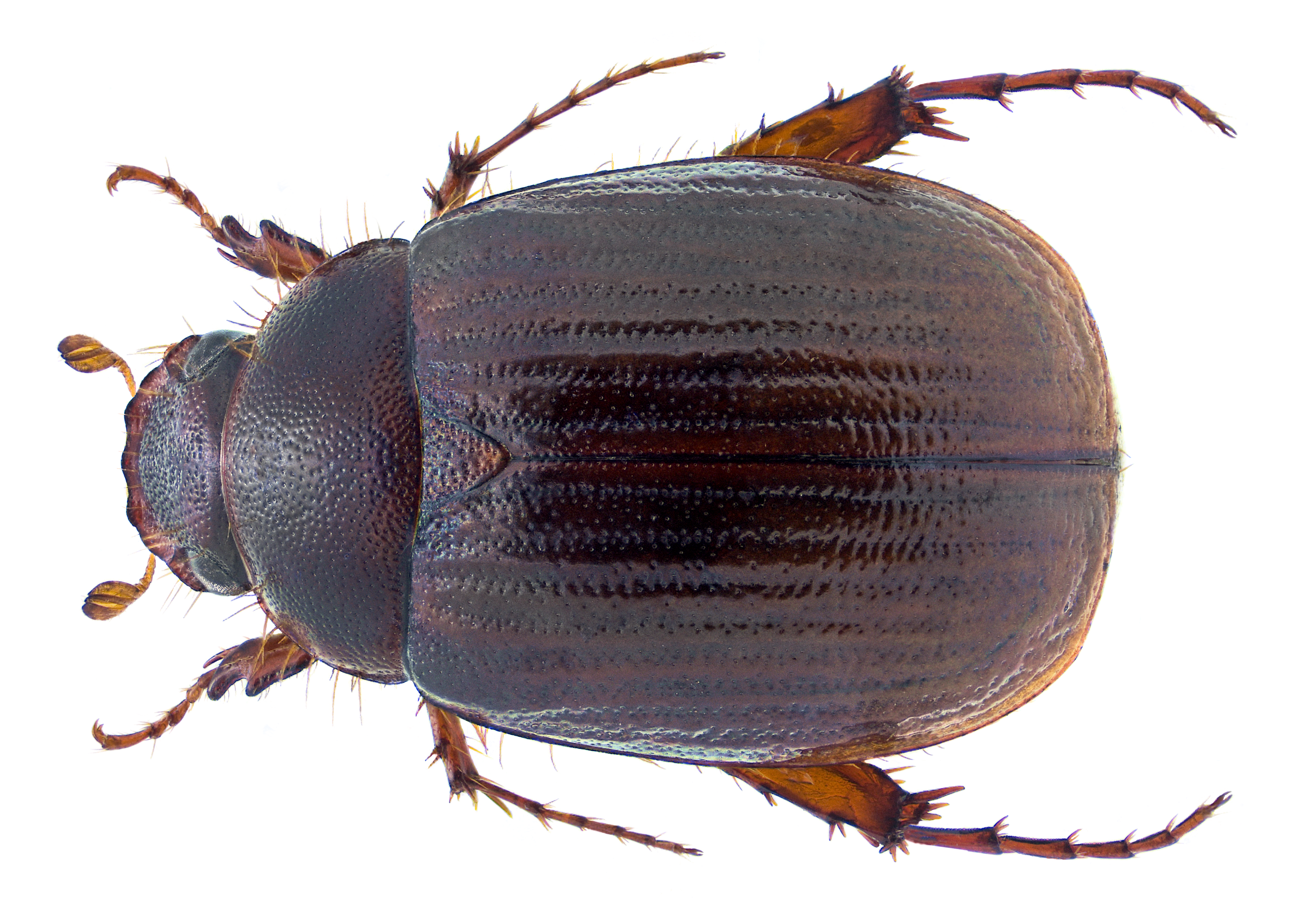

Scientific classification
- Kingdom: Animalia
- Phylum: Arthropoda
- Clade: Pancrustacea
- Class: Insecta
- Order: Coleoptera
- Suborder: Polyphaga
- Infraorder: Scarabaeiformia
- Family: Scarabaeidae
- Genus: Maladera
- Species: M. parva

Binomial name
- Maladera parva (Moser, 1908)

Synonyms
- Cephaloserica parva Moser, 1908; Cephaloserica kojimai Miyake, 1991

= Maladera parva =

Species of beetle

Maladera parva is a species of beetle of the family Scarabaeidae. It is found in China (Fujian, Guangxi, Yunnan), Taiwan, Laos, Vietnam and Thailand.

== Description ==
Adults reach a length of about 5.6 mm. They have a reddish to dark brown, short-oval body, with yellow antennae. They are shiny and the dorsal surface is glabrous.
