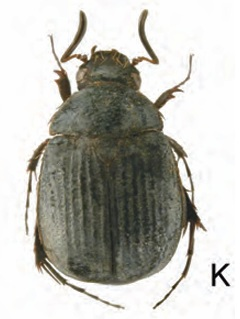

Scientific classification
- Kingdom: Animalia
- Phylum: Arthropoda
- Class: Insecta
- Order: Coleoptera
- Suborder: Polyphaga
- Infraorder: Scarabaeiformia
- Family: Scarabaeidae
- Genus: Maladera
- Species: M. sikkimensis

Binomial name
- Maladera sikkimensis (Brenske, 1898)

Synonyms
- Autoserica sikkimensis Brenske, 1898; Serica sikkimensis

= Maladera sikkimensis =

Species of beetle

Maladera sikkimensis is a species of beetle of the family Scarabaeidae. It is found in India (Meghalaya, West Bengal) and Nepal.

== Description ==
Adults reach a length of about 5.3–5.5 mm. They have a black, short, oval body, with a faint greenish sheen. The upper surface is dull and glabrous, except for a few setae on the head and the lateral cilia of the pronotum and elytra.
