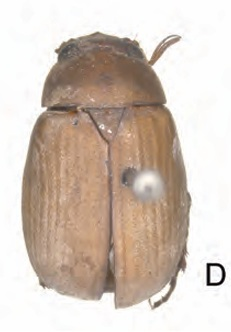

Scientific classification
- Kingdom: Animalia
- Phylum: Arthropoda
- Class: Insecta
- Order: Coleoptera
- Suborder: Polyphaga
- Infraorder: Scarabaeiformia
- Family: Scarabaeidae
- Genus: Maladera
- Species: M. beata

Binomial name
- Maladera beata (Brenske, 1902)

Synonyms
- Coronoserica beata Brenske, 1902

= Maladera beata =

Species of beetle

Maladera beata is a species of beetle of the family Scarabaeidae. It is found in India (Tamil Nadu).

== Description ==
Adults reach a length of about 7.3 mm. They have a reddish brown, oblong-oval body, with the elytra slightly lighter and the antennae yellowish. The dorsal surface is dull and glabrous, except for a few short setae on sides of the elytra.

== Distribution ==
The locality labels of the lectotype give a type locality of Sierra Leone, but researchers conclude that this must be erroneous, since all relatives of this species live in Asia and recent records are all from southern India.
