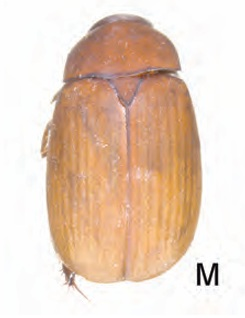

Scientific classification
- Kingdom: Animalia
- Phylum: Arthropoda
- Class: Insecta
- Order: Coleoptera
- Suborder: Polyphaga
- Infraorder: Scarabaeiformia
- Family: Scarabaeidae
- Genus: Maladera
- Species: M. eusericina

Binomial name
- Maladera eusericina Ahrens & Fabrizi, 2016

Synonyms
- Autoserica sericina Frey, 1972 (preocc.)

= Maladera eusericina =

Species of beetle

Maladera eusericina is a species of beetle of the family Scarabaeidae. It is found in India (Kerala).

== Description ==
Adults reach a length of about 6.1 mm. They have a reddish brown, oblong-oval body with yellowish antennae. They are mostly dull and the dorsal surface is nearly glabrous, except for some setae on the head.
