= Maladera houzhenziensis =

Scientific classification
- Kingdom: Animalia
- Phylum: Arthropoda
- Class: Insecta
- Order: Coleoptera
- Suborder: Polyphaga
- Infraorder: Scarabaeiformia
- Family: Scarabaeidae
- Genus: Maladera
- Species: M. houzhenziensis

Binomial name
- Maladera houzhenziensis Ahrens, Fabrizi & Liu, 2021

Species of beetle

Maladera houzhenziensis is a species of beetle of the family Scarabaeidae. It is found in China (Shaanxi).

== Description ==
Adults reach a length of about 8.1–8.5 mm. They have a dark reddish brown, oblong body. The antennae are yellow and the dorsal surface is dull and almost glabrous.

== Etymology ==
The species name refers to its type locality, Houzhenzi.
