= Maladera schenklingi =

Scientific classification
- Kingdom: Animalia
- Phylum: Arthropoda
- Clade: Pancrustacea
- Class: Insecta
- Order: Coleoptera
- Suborder: Polyphaga
- Infraorder: Scarabaeiformia
- Family: Scarabaeidae
- Genus: Maladera
- Species: M. schenklingi

Binomial name
- Maladera schenklingi (Moser, 1918)

Synonyms
- Autoserica schenklingi Moser, 1918

Species of beetle

Maladera schenklingi is a species of beetle of the family Scarabaeidae. It is found in Afghanistan, Iran, Nepal and northern India (the flatlands of the Gangetic plain and Meghalaya).

== Description ==
Adults reach a length of about 6.3–8.1 mm. They have a reddish to dark brown, oval body. The upper surface is mostly dull and glabrous, except for some setae on the head and the lateral cilia of the pronotum and elytra.

== Etymology ==
The species is named in honour of Kustos S. Schenkung.
