= Maladera ignava =

Scientific classification
- Kingdom: Animalia
- Phylum: Arthropoda
- Class: Insecta
- Order: Coleoptera
- Suborder: Polyphaga
- Infraorder: Scarabaeiformia
- Family: Scarabaeidae
- Genus: Maladera
- Species: M. ignava

Binomial name
- Maladera ignava (Brenske, 1894)

Synonyms
- Serica ignava Brenske, 1894; Autoserica distincta Moser, 1915

Species of beetle

Maladera ignava is a species of beetle of the family Scarabaeidae. It is found in India (Maharashtra).

== Description ==
Adults reach a length of about 8.8 mm. They have a reddish brown, oblong-oval body, with yellowish antennae. The dorsal surface is dull and nearly glabrous, except for a few short setae on sides of the elytra.
