= Maladera teinzoana =

Scientific classification
- Kingdom: Animalia
- Phylum: Arthropoda
- Class: Insecta
- Order: Coleoptera
- Suborder: Polyphaga
- Infraorder: Scarabaeiformia
- Family: Scarabaeidae
- Genus: Maladera
- Species: M. teinzoana

Binomial name
- Maladera teinzoana (Brenske, 1899)

Synonyms
- Autoserica teinzoana Brenske, 1899

Species of beetle

Maladera teinzoana is a species of beetle of the family Scarabaeidae. It is found in Thailand.

== Description ==
Adults reach a length of about 5-5.8 mm. They are small, rounded-oval, dull and brownish-black, with a faint opalescent sheen. The clypeus is tapered, somewhat wavy at the anterior margin, densely and wrinkledly punctate, bearing setae along the suture in coarser punctures, with a very slight elevation in the middle. The frons is finely punctate. The pronotum is slightly rounded at the sides, the posterior angles are distinctly rounded, the surface is very finely and densely punctate, with minute hairs in the punctures, the marginal setae are distinct. The scutellum is elongate. The elytra are densely, irregularly, and rather coarsely punctate in the striae. The striae are wider than the narrow, somewhat raised, smooth interstices, with a minute hair in each puncture. The pygidium is pointed.
