= Maladera seleuciensis =

Scientific classification
- Kingdom: Animalia
- Phylum: Arthropoda
- Clade: Pancrustacea
- Class: Insecta
- Order: Coleoptera
- Suborder: Polyphaga
- Infraorder: Scarabaeiformia
- Family: Scarabaeidae
- Genus: Maladera
- Species: M. seleuciensis

Binomial name
- Maladera seleuciensis Petrovitz, 1969

Species of beetle

Maladera seleuciensis is a species of beetle of the family Scarabaeidae. It is found in Turkey.

== Description ==
Adults reach a length of about 7.6–9.1 mm. They have a shiny, light brown, narrow body, without a metallic sheen. The forehead is darker and the antennae and the setae of the underside are brownish-yellow.
