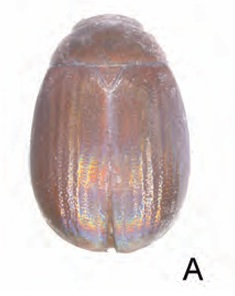

Scientific classification
- Kingdom: Animalia
- Phylum: Arthropoda
- Class: Insecta
- Order: Coleoptera
- Suborder: Polyphaga
- Infraorder: Scarabaeiformia
- Family: Scarabaeidae
- Genus: Maladera
- Species: M. vernacula

Binomial name
- Maladera vernacula Ahrens & Fabrizi, 2016

= Maladera vernacula =

Species of beetle

Maladera vernacula is a species of beetle of the family Scarabaeidae. It is found in India (Karnataka, Kerala, Tamil Nadu).

== Description ==
Adults reach a length of about 8.9–10.7 mm. They have a dark reddish brown, oval body. The antennae are yellowish. They are dull, although the elytra have an iridescent shine. The dorsal surface is nearly glabrous, except for some setae on the head.

== Etymology ==
The species name is derived from Latin vernaculus (meaning indigenous).
