= Maladera zhejiangensis =

Scientific classification
- Kingdom: Animalia
- Phylum: Arthropoda
- Class: Insecta
- Order: Coleoptera
- Suborder: Polyphaga
- Infraorder: Scarabaeiformia
- Family: Scarabaeidae
- Genus: Maladera
- Species: M. zhejiangensis

Binomial name
- Maladera zhejiangensis Ahrens, Fabrizi & Liu, 2021

Species of beetle

Maladera zhejiangensis is a species of beetle of the family Scarabaeidae. It is found in China (Zhejiang).

== Description ==
Adults reach a length of about 7.6–9.1 mm. They have a dark brown, oblong oval body, with yellowish antennae. The labroclypeus, anterior frons and pronotum are shiny, while the remainder of the dorsal surface is dull. They are glabrous, except for a few long setae on the head, pronotum and elytra.

== Etymology ==
The species name refers to its occurrence in the Zhejiang province.
