= Maladera unguicularis =

Scientific classification
- Kingdom: Animalia
- Phylum: Arthropoda
- Class: Insecta
- Order: Coleoptera
- Suborder: Polyphaga
- Infraorder: Scarabaeiformia
- Family: Scarabaeidae
- Genus: Maladera
- Species: M. unguicularis

Binomial name
- Maladera unguicularis (Brenske, 1899)

Synonyms
- Autoserica unguicularis Brenske, 1899

Species of beetle

Maladera unguicularis is a species of beetle of the family Scarabaeidae. It is found in Thailand.

== Description ==
Adults reach a length of about 10–11 mm. They are deeply dull with very little opalescent sheen. They are reddish-brown underneath and dark above. The clypeus is large and broad, rounded at the corners, the margin distinctly raised, behind it in the middle with a weak, rounded elevation, sparsely and strongly punctate. The pronotum is short, slightly rounded at the sides with broadly rounded hind corners. The scutellum is large and pointed. The elytra are punctate in rows with coarse, closely spaced punctures alongside, bearing minute hairs. The spaces between are quite strongly raised, narrow, and individually punctate. The pygidium is slightly rounded, dull-punctate and silky-shimmering.
