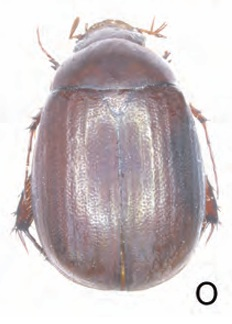

Scientific classification
- Kingdom: Animalia
- Phylum: Arthropoda
- Class: Insecta
- Order: Coleoptera
- Suborder: Polyphaga
- Infraorder: Scarabaeiformia
- Family: Scarabaeidae
- Genus: Maladera
- Species: M. trivandrumensis

Binomial name
- Maladera trivandrumensis Ahrens & Fabrizi, 2016

= Maladera trivandrumensis =

Species of beetle

Maladera trivandrumensis is a species of beetle of the family Scarabaeidae. It is found in India (Kerala).

== Description ==
Adults reach a length of about 9.6 mm. They have an oval body. The dorsal and ventral surface are dark reddish brown and the antennae are yellowish. They are dull (partly with an iridescent shine) and the dorsal surface is nearly glabrous, except for some setae on the head.

== Etymology ==
The species is named after the city of Trivandrum, close to the type locality of the species.
