= Maladera angusta =

Scientific classification
- Kingdom: Animalia
- Phylum: Arthropoda
- Class: Insecta
- Order: Coleoptera
- Suborder: Polyphaga
- Infraorder: Scarabaeiformia
- Family: Scarabaeidae
- Genus: Maladera
- Species: M. angusta

Binomial name
- Maladera angusta Baraud, 1990

Species of beetle

Maladera angusta is a species of beetle of the family Scarabaeidae. It is found in Turkey.

== Description ==
Adults reach a length of about 7.5 mm. They have a rather narrow, slender, moderately convex body. The upper surface is shiny, dark reddish-brown, with a slight greenish sheen. The antennal club is yellowish-brown.
