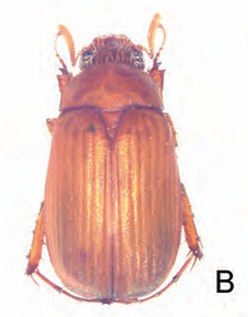

Scientific classification
- Kingdom: Animalia
- Phylum: Arthropoda
- Clade: Pancrustacea
- Class: Insecta
- Order: Coleoptera
- Suborder: Polyphaga
- Infraorder: Scarabaeiformia
- Family: Scarabaeidae
- Genus: Maladera
- Species: M. rufotestacea

Binomial name
- Maladera rufotestacea (Moser, 1915)

Synonyms
- Autoserica rufotestacea Moser, 1915

= Maladera rufotestacea =

Species of beetle

Maladera rufotestacea is a species of beetle of the family Scarabaeidae. It is found in India (Manipur, Meghalaya, Mizoram), Myanmar, Thailand, Vietnam and China (Yunnan).

== Description ==
Adults reach a length of about 8.6 mm. They have a reddish brown, oblong body. The dorsal surface is mostly dull and nearly glabrous, except for the setae of the lateral margins of the pronotum and elytra.
