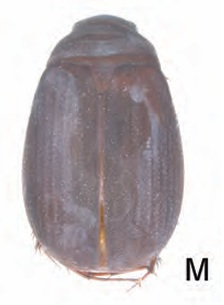

Scientific classification
- Kingdom: Animalia
- Phylum: Arthropoda
- Class: Insecta
- Order: Coleoptera
- Suborder: Polyphaga
- Infraorder: Scarabaeiformia
- Family: Scarabaeidae
- Genus: Maladera
- Species: M. sagittula

Binomial name
- Maladera sagittula Ahrens & Fabrizi, 2016

= Maladera sagittula =

Species of beetle

Maladera sagittula is a species of beetle of the family Scarabaeidae. It is found in India (Kerala).

== Description ==
Adults reach a length of about 8.1–9 mm. They have a dark brown, oblong-oval body with yellowish antennae. They are mostly dull and the dorsal surface is nearly glabrous, except for some setae on the head.

== Etymology ==
The species name is derived from Latin sagittulus (meaning a small arrow) and refers to the shape of the apex of the right paramere.
