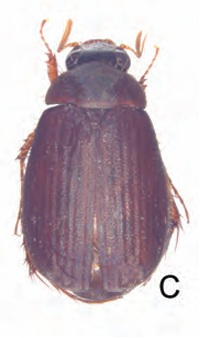

Scientific classification
- Kingdom: Animalia
- Phylum: Arthropoda
- Class: Insecta
- Order: Coleoptera
- Suborder: Polyphaga
- Infraorder: Scarabaeiformia
- Family: Scarabaeidae
- Genus: Maladera
- Species: M. minops

Binomial name
- Maladera minops Ahrens & Fabrizi, 2016

= Maladera minops =

Species of beetle

Maladera minops is a species of beetle of the family Scarabaeidae. It is found in India (Meghalaya).

== Description ==
Adults reach a length of about 7.3–8.3 mm. They have an oblong-oval body. The dorsal surface is dark brown, while the ventral surface is dark reddish brown. They are mostly dull, but the head is moderately shiny. The dorsal surface is nearly glabrous, except for some setae on the head.

== Etymology ==
The species name is an arbitrary combination of letters.
