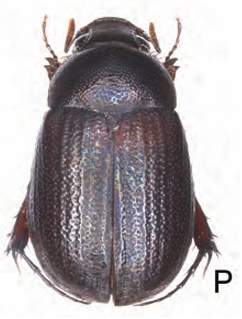

Scientific classification
- Kingdom: Animalia
- Phylum: Arthropoda
- Class: Insecta
- Order: Coleoptera
- Suborder: Polyphaga
- Infraorder: Scarabaeiformia
- Family: Scarabaeidae
- Genus: Maladera
- Species: M. hauseri

Binomial name
- Maladera hauseri (Brenske, 1899)

Synonyms
- Autoserica hauseri Brenske, 1899

= Maladera hauseri =

Species of beetle

Maladera hauseri is a species of beetle of the family Scarabaeidae. It is found in India (Karnataka, Madhya Pradesh, Maharashtra, Telangana).

== Description ==
Adults reach a length of about 7.8 mm. They have a blackish brown, oval body, the dorsal face with an iridescent shine. They are nearly glabrous, except for the lateral setae of the elytra and pronotum.
