= Maladera kermanica =

Scientific classification
- Kingdom: Animalia
- Phylum: Arthropoda
- Clade: Pancrustacea
- Class: Insecta
- Order: Coleoptera
- Suborder: Polyphaga
- Infraorder: Scarabaeiformia
- Family: Scarabaeidae
- Genus: Maladera
- Species: M. kermanica

Binomial name
- Maladera kermanica Montreuil, 2016

Species of beetle

Maladera kermanica is a species of beetle of the family Scarabaeidae. It is found in Iran.

== Description ==
Adults reach a length of about 7-7.5 mm. They are light reddish-brown, except for the pale yellow antennae.

== Etymology ==
The species is named after its type locality, the Kerman province.
