= Maladera jaroslavi =

Scientific classification
- Kingdom: Animalia
- Phylum: Arthropoda
- Clade: Pancrustacea
- Class: Insecta
- Order: Coleoptera
- Suborder: Polyphaga
- Infraorder: Scarabaeiformia
- Family: Scarabaeidae
- Genus: Maladera
- Species: M. jaroslavi

Binomial name
- Maladera jaroslavi Ahrens, Fabrizi & Liu, 2021

Species of beetle

Maladera jaroslavi is a species of beetle of the family Scarabaeidae. It is found in China (Fujian).

== Description ==
Adults reach a length of about 10.5 mm. They have a dark brown, wide, oval body. The legs are brown and the antennae are yellow. The dorsal surface is dull (but the labroclypeus, tarsomeres, and tibiae are shiny) and glabrous.

== Etymology ==
The species is named after its collector, Jaroslav Turna.
