= Maladera kumei =

Scientific classification
- Kingdom: Animalia
- Phylum: Arthropoda
- Class: Insecta
- Order: Coleoptera
- Suborder: Polyphaga
- Infraorder: Scarabaeiformia
- Family: Scarabaeidae
- Genus: Maladera
- Species: M. kumei

Binomial name
- Maladera kumei Kobayashi, 1990

Species of beetle

Maladera kumei is a species of beetle of the family Scarabaeidae. It is found in Taiwan.

== Description ==
Adults reach a length of about 8–11 mm. They have a reddish brown to dark reddish brown, oval body, with the head sometimes dark brown. The antennal club is yellowish brown and the tarsi dark brown to dark reddish brown. The surface of the body is opaque and iridescent. The anterior part of the frons, clypeus, antennae and legs are shining.
