= Maladera nanpingensis =

Scientific classification
- Kingdom: Animalia
- Phylum: Arthropoda
- Class: Insecta
- Order: Coleoptera
- Suborder: Polyphaga
- Infraorder: Scarabaeiformia
- Family: Scarabaeidae
- Genus: Maladera
- Species: M. nanpingensis

Binomial name
- Maladera nanpingensis Ahrens, Fabrizi & Liu, 2021

Species of beetle

Maladera nanpingensis is a species of beetle of the family Scarabaeidae. It is found in China (Guangxi).

== Description ==
Adults reach a length of about 10.6 mm. They have a reddish brown, oval body. The frons is slightly darker and the antennae are yellow. The labroclypeus is shiny, but the remainder of the dorsal surface is dull. There are several short setae on the head and at the margin of the pronotum and elytra.

== Etymology ==
The species is named after its type locality, Nanping.
