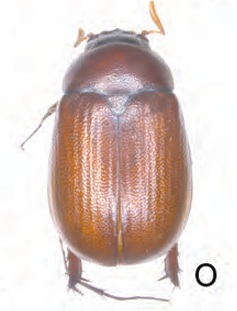

Scientific classification
- Kingdom: Animalia
- Phylum: Arthropoda
- Class: Insecta
- Order: Coleoptera
- Suborder: Polyphaga
- Infraorder: Scarabaeiformia
- Family: Scarabaeidae
- Genus: Maladera
- Species: M. shimogana

Binomial name
- Maladera shimogana Ahrens & Fabrizi, 2016

= Maladera shimogana =

Species of beetle

Maladera shimogana is a species of beetle of the family Scarabaeidae. It is found in India (Karnataka).

== Description ==
Adults reach a length of about 9.5 mm. They have a reddish brown, oblong-oval body, with yellowish antennae. The dorsal surface is moderately shiny and glabrous, except for a few short setae on the sides of the elytra.

== Etymology ==
The species name refers to its type locality, Shimoga.
