= Maladera nasutella =

Scientific classification
- Kingdom: Animalia
- Phylum: Arthropoda
- Class: Insecta
- Order: Coleoptera
- Suborder: Polyphaga
- Infraorder: Scarabaeiformia
- Family: Scarabaeidae
- Genus: Maladera
- Species: M. nasutella

Binomial name
- Maladera nasutella (Ahrens, 2004)

Synonyms
- Hemiserica nasutella Ahrens, 2004

Species of beetle

Maladera nasutella is a species of beetle of the family Scarabaeidae. It is found in India (Sikkim) and Nepal.

== Description ==
Adults reach a length of about 4.7–5.8 mm. They have a yellowish-brown, oval body, while the head and pronotum are light reddish-brown. The upper surface is mostly dull and glabrous, except for some setae on the head and the lateral cilia of the pronotum and elytra.
