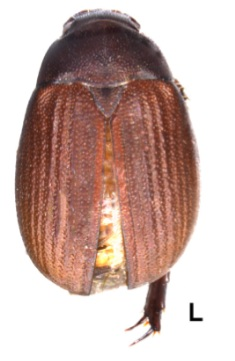

Scientific classification
- Kingdom: Animalia
- Phylum: Arthropoda
- Class: Insecta
- Order: Coleoptera
- Suborder: Polyphaga
- Infraorder: Scarabaeiformia
- Family: Scarabaeidae
- Genus: Maladera
- Species: M. thirthahalliensis

Binomial name
- Maladera thirthahalliensis Sreedevi, Ranasinghe, Fabrizi & Ahrens, 2019

= Maladera thirthahalliensis =

Species of beetle

Maladera thirthahalliensis is a species of beetle of the family Scarabaeidae. It is found in India (Karnataka).

== Description ==
Adults reach a length of about 5.9 mm. They have an oval body. The dorsal and ventral surface are dark brown, with the elytra slightly lighter. The antennae are yellowish. They are moderately shiny and nearly glabrous, except for some single setae on the dorsal surface of the head.

== Etymology ==
The species name refers to the type locality, Thirthahalli.
