= Maladera pseudomollis =

Scientific classification
- Kingdom: Animalia
- Phylum: Arthropoda
- Class: Insecta
- Order: Coleoptera
- Suborder: Polyphaga
- Infraorder: Scarabaeiformia
- Family: Scarabaeidae
- Genus: Maladera
- Species: M. pseudomollis

Binomial name
- Maladera pseudomollis Fabrizi & Ahrens, 2014

Species of beetle

Maladera pseudomollis is a species of beetle of the family Scarabaeidae. It is found in Sri Lanka and India (Tamil Nadu).

== Description ==
Adults reach a length of about 6.5–8 mm. They have a light reddish brown, oblong-oval body. The elytra and antennae are yellowish brown. The dorsal surface is dull and glabrous, except for a few small setae on the head and the lateral margins of the pronotum and elytra.

== Etymology ==
The name pseudomollis is combined from the prefix pseudo- (Ancient Greek, pseudes, false) and mollis, with reference to the high similarity to Maladera mollis.
