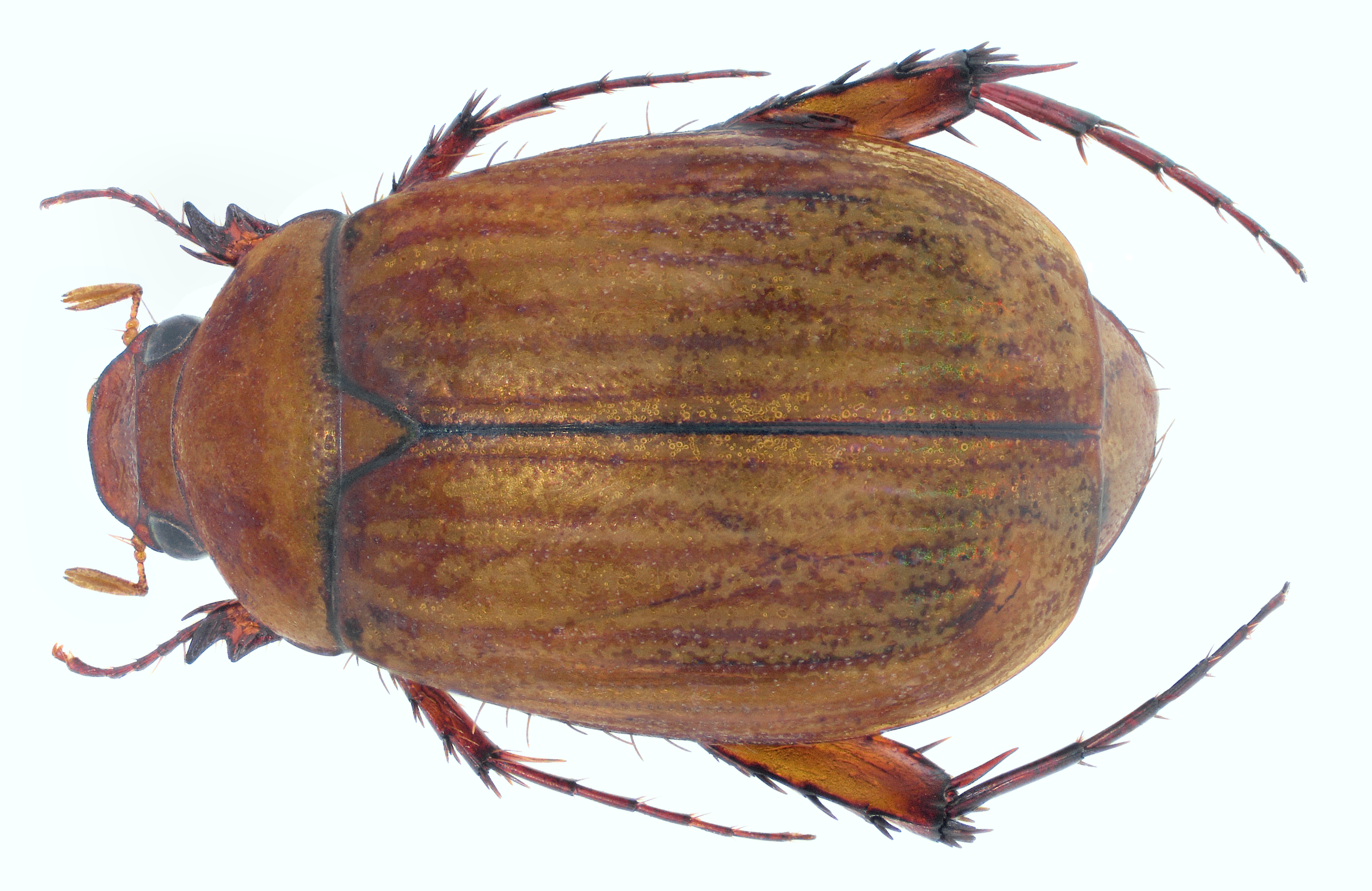

Scientific classification
- Kingdom: Animalia
- Phylum: Arthropoda
- Clade: Pancrustacea
- Class: Insecta
- Order: Coleoptera
- Suborder: Polyphaga
- Infraorder: Scarabaeiformia
- Family: Scarabaeidae
- Genus: Maladera
- Species: M. straminea

Binomial name
- Maladera straminea (Moser, 1915)

Synonyms
- Autoserica straminea Moser, 1915

= Maladera straminea =

Species of beetle

Maladera straminea is a species of beetle of the family Scarabaeidae. It is found in Vietnam and China (Guangxi, Jiangxi, Yunnan).

== Description ==
Adults reach a length of about 8.1 mm. They have a dark yellowish brown, oblong-oval body. They are mostly dull (but the labroclypeus is shiny) and the dorsal surface is nearly glabrous, with only a few erect long setae on the pronotum, head and elytra.
