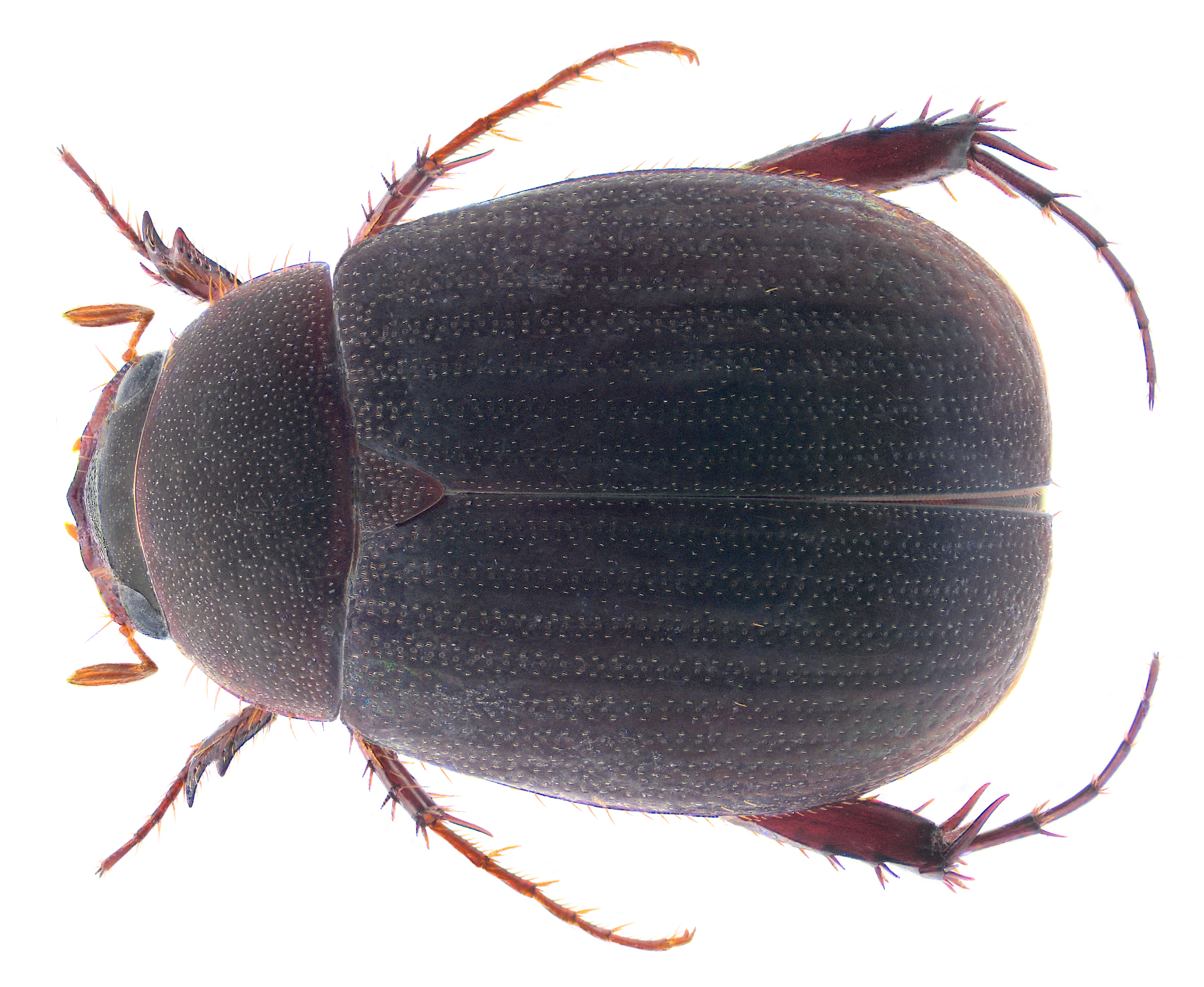

Scientific classification
- Kingdom: Animalia
- Phylum: Arthropoda
- Class: Insecta
- Order: Coleoptera
- Suborder: Polyphaga
- Infraorder: Scarabaeiformia
- Family: Scarabaeidae
- Genus: Maladera
- Species: M. saitoi

Binomial name
- Maladera saitoi (Niijima & Kinoshita, 1927)

Synonyms
- Autoserica saitoi Niijima & Kinoshita, 1927

= Maladera saitoi =

Species of beetle

Maladera saitoi is a species of beetle of the family Scarabaeidae. It is found in China (Fujian, Guangdong, Guangxi, Hainan, Yunnan), Taiwan, Laos and Vietnam.

== Description ==
Adults reach a length of about 6.5 mm. They have a dark brown to blackish, oval body. The antennae are yellow. The dorsal surface is dull and nearly glabrous, except for some single setae on the head.
