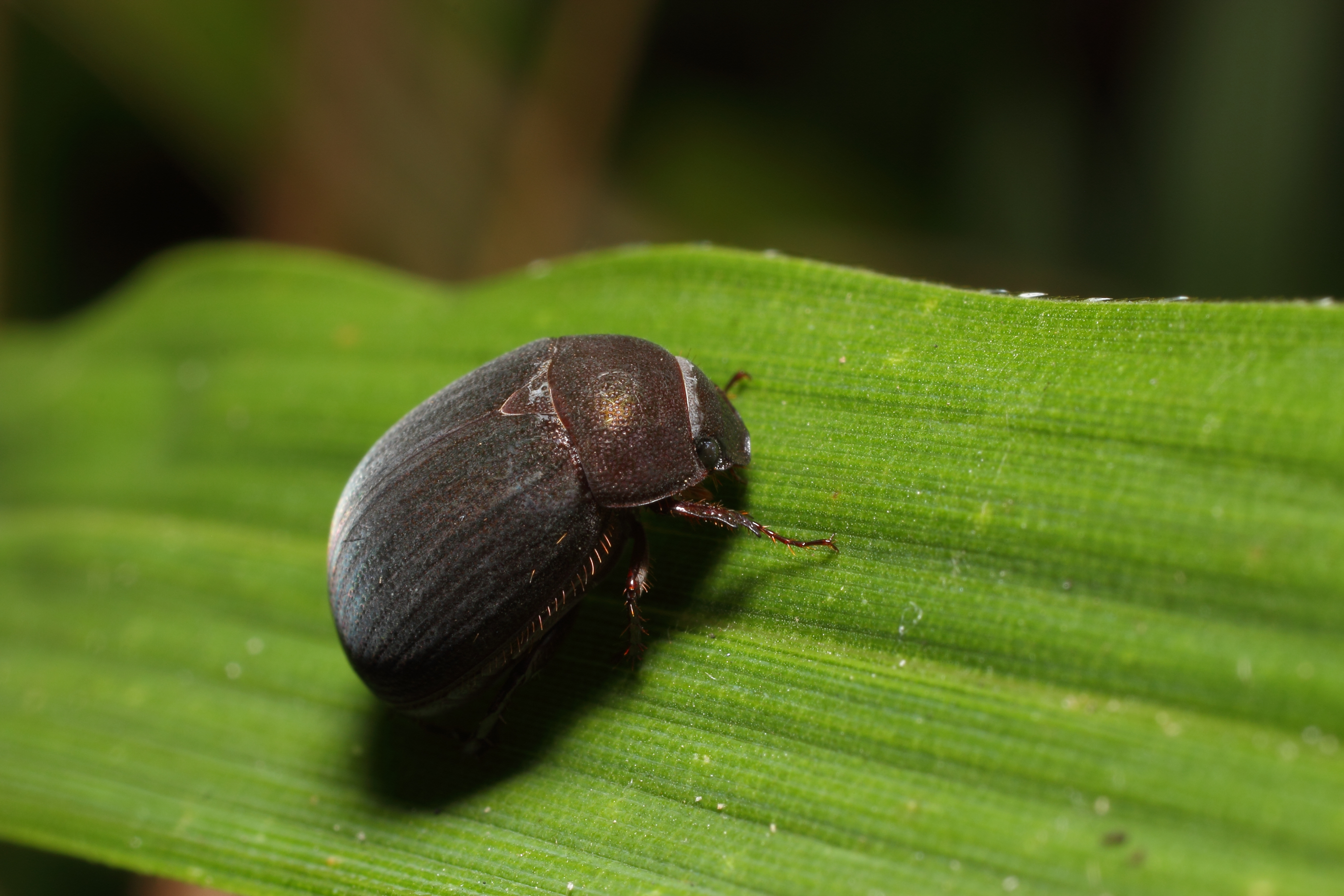

Scientific classification
- Kingdom: Animalia
- Phylum: Arthropoda
- Class: Insecta
- Order: Coleoptera
- Suborder: Polyphaga
- Infraorder: Scarabaeiformia
- Family: Scarabaeidae
- Genus: Maladera
- Species: M. japonica

Binomial name
- Maladera japonica (Motschulsky, 1860)

Synonyms
- Serica japonica Motschulsky, 1860

= Maladera japonica =

Species of beetle

Maladera japonica is a species of scarab beetle in the family Scarabaeidae.

== Subspecies ==
These two subspecies belong to the species Maladera japonica:

- Maladera japonica japonica^{g} (Japan, China: Shanxi)
- Maladera japonica korai Miyake & Yamaya, 1995^{c g} (Korea)

Data sources: i = ITIS, c = Catalogue of Life, g = GBIF, b = Bugguide.net
