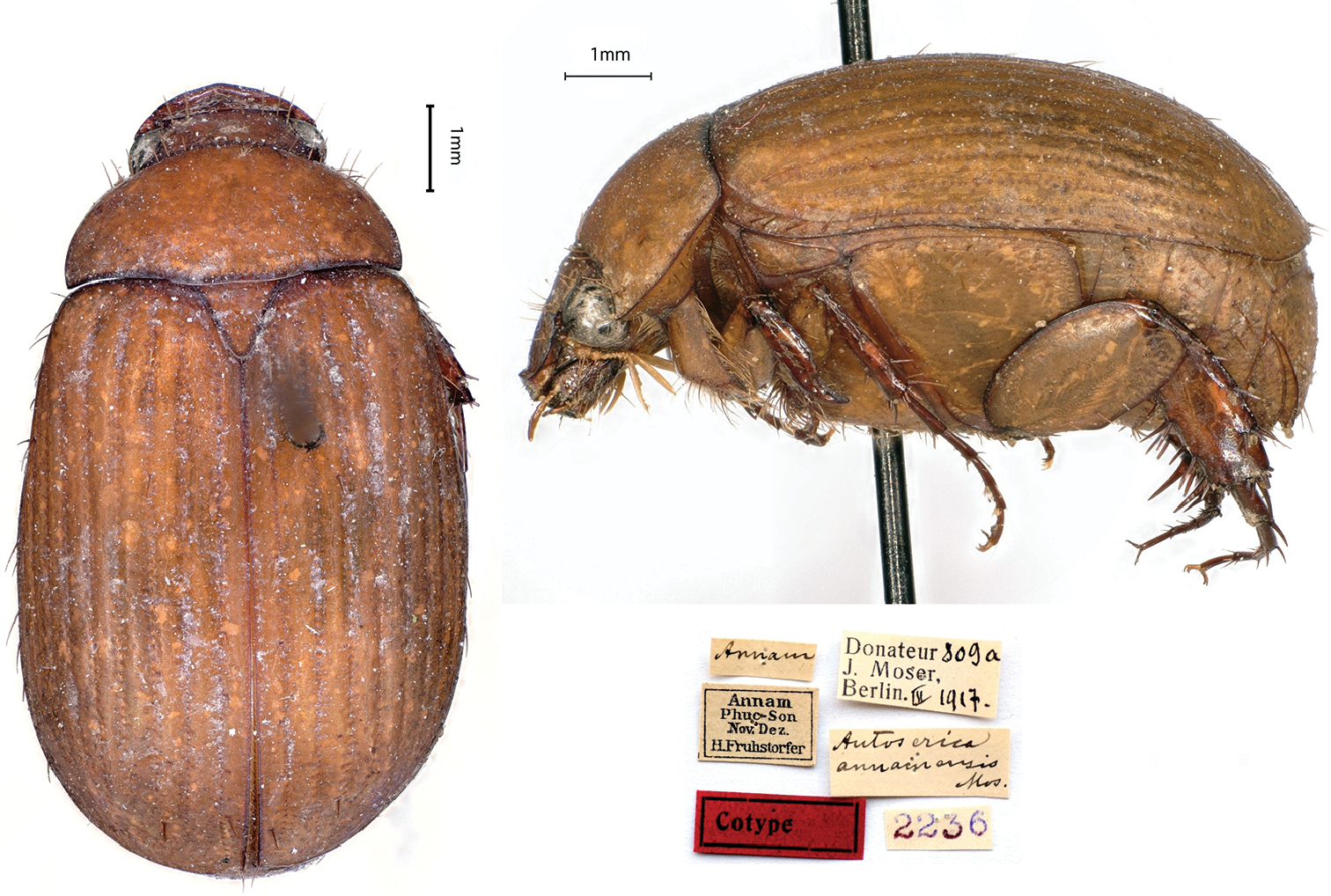

Scientific classification
- Kingdom: Animalia
- Phylum: Arthropoda
- Clade: Pancrustacea
- Class: Insecta
- Order: Coleoptera
- Suborder: Polyphaga
- Infraorder: Scarabaeiformia
- Family: Scarabaeidae
- Genus: Maladera
- Species: M. annamensis

Binomial name
- Maladera annamensis (Moser, 1915)

Synonyms
- Autoserica annamensis Moser, 1915

= Maladera annamensis =

Species of beetle

Maladera annamensis is a species of beetle of the family Scarabaeidae. It is found in Thailand, Vietnam and Taiwan.
