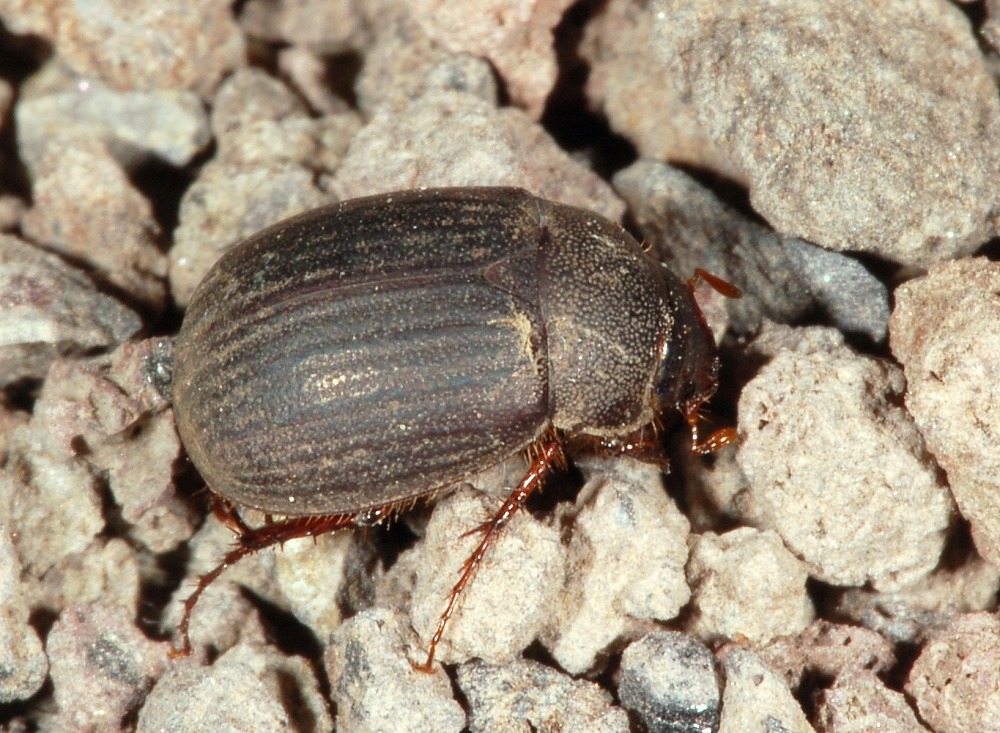

Scientific classification
- Kingdom: Animalia
- Phylum: Arthropoda
- Class: Insecta
- Order: Coleoptera
- Suborder: Polyphaga
- Infraorder: Scarabaeiformia
- Family: Scarabaeidae
- Genus: Maladera
- Species: M. holosericea

Binomial name
- Maladera holosericea (Scopoli, 1772)

Synonyms
- Scarabaeus holosericeus Scopoli, 1772; Omaloplia fusca Mulsant, 1842; Melolontha pellucida Schonherr, 1817; Melolontha berolinensis Herbst, 1786; Scarabaeus fumosus Geoffroy, 1785; Scarabaeus lamellatus Geoffroy, 1785; Melolontha variabilis Fabricius, 1776; Scarabaeus pellucidulus Sulzer, 1776; Scarabaeus sulzeri Fuessly, 1775

= Maladera holosericea =

Species of beetle

Maladera holosericea is a species of beetle of the family Scarabaeidae. It is found in Europe (Albania, Austria, Belarus, Belgium, Bosnia Herzegovina, Bulgaria, Croatia, the Czech Republic, Denmark, France, Germany, Hungary, Italy, Latvia, Lithuania, Luxembourg, Moldova, Montenegro, the Netherlands, Poland, Romania, Russia, Serbia, Slovakia, Spain, Sweden, Switzerland, Ukraine), Kazakhstan, Kyrgyzstan, China (Beijing, Gansu, Hebei, Heilongjiang, Liaoning, Nei Mongol, Tianjin, Xinjiang) and Korea.

== Description ==
Adults reach a length of about 7–8.7 mm. They have a brown to blackish brown body.
