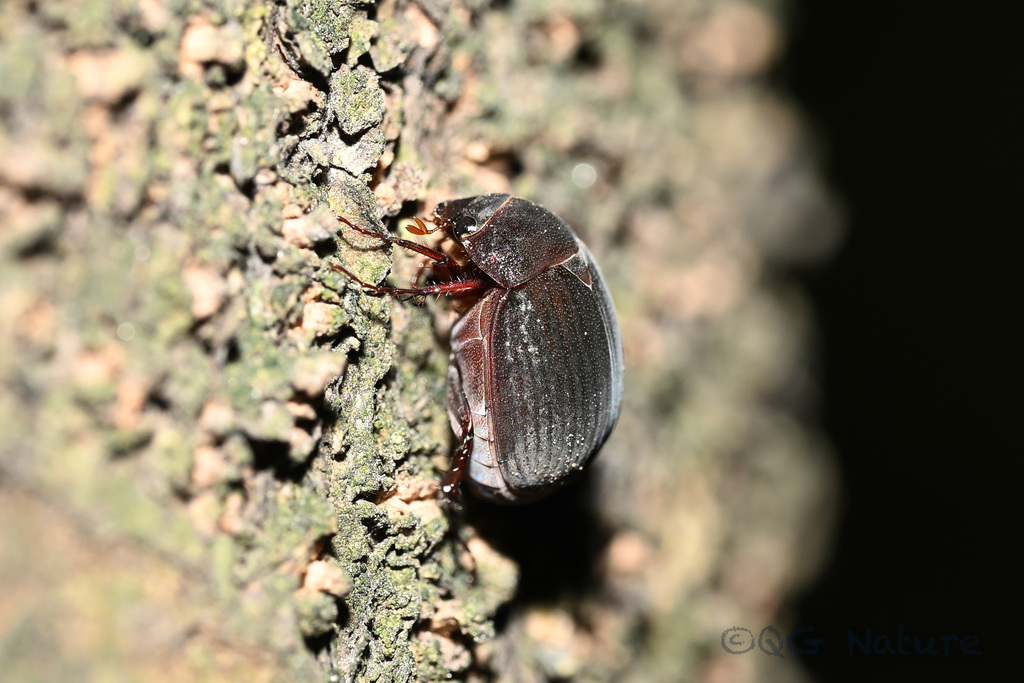

Scientific classification
- Kingdom: Animalia
- Phylum: Arthropoda
- Class: Insecta
- Order: Coleoptera
- Suborder: Polyphaga
- Infraorder: Scarabaeiformia
- Family: Scarabaeidae
- Genus: Maladera
- Species: M. orientalis

Binomial name
- Maladera orientalis (Motschulsky, 1858)

Synonyms
- Serica orientalis Motschulsky, 1857; Autoserica davidis Brenske, 1898; Serica mirabilis Brenske, 1894; Serica famelica Brenske, 1898; Serica salebrosa Brenske, 1898; Amaladera cavifrons Reitter, 1896; Amaladera diffinis Reitter, 1896; Serica pekingensis Brenske, 1898

= Maladera orientalis =

Species of beetle

Maladera orientalis is a species of beetle of the family Scarabaeidae. It is found in China (Beijing, Gansu, Guizhou, Hebei, Hubei, Hunan, Nei Mongol, Ningxia, Qinghai, Shaanxi, Shandong, Shanxi, Sichuan, Xinjiang, Xizang, Yunnan, Zhejiang), Japan, North Korea, South Korea, the Russian Far East and Taiwan.

== Description ==
Adults reach a length of about 7.6 mm. They have a dark brown, dull, oval body. The antennae are yellow. The labroclypeus is moderately shiny. They are glabrous, except for a few short setae on the head and lateral margins of the pronotum and elytra.
