= Maladera allonitens =

Scientific classification
- Kingdom: Animalia
- Phylum: Arthropoda
- Class: Insecta
- Order: Coleoptera
- Suborder: Polyphaga
- Infraorder: Scarabaeiformia
- Family: Scarabaeidae
- Genus: Maladera
- Species: M. allonitens

Binomial name
- Maladera allonitens Ahrens, Fabrizi & Liu, 2021

Species of beetle

Maladera allonitens is a species of beetle of the family Scarabaeidae. It is found in China (Fujian, Jiangxi).

== Description ==
Adults reach a length of about 8.1–9.5 mm. They have a reddish brown, oblong-oval body. The antennae are yellow. They are shiny and the dorsal surface is nearly glabrous.

== Etymology ==
The species name is derived from Greek allo and the species name nitens and refers to its similarity to Maladera nitens.
