= Maladera paranitens =

Scientific classification
- Kingdom: Animalia
- Phylum: Arthropoda
- Class: Insecta
- Order: Coleoptera
- Suborder: Polyphaga
- Infraorder: Scarabaeiformia
- Family: Scarabaeidae
- Genus: Maladera
- Species: M. paranitens

Binomial name
- Maladera paranitens Ahrens, Fabrizi & Liu, 2021

Species of beetle

Maladera paranitens is a species of beetle of the family Scarabaeidae. It is found in China (Guangdong, Hunan, Yunnan).

Adults reach a length of about 7.5–9.5 mm. They have a dark reddish brown, oblong-oval body. The antennae are yellow. They are shiny and the dorsal surface is nearly glabrous.

The species name is derived from Greek para (meaning close to) and the species name nitens and refers to its similarity to Maladera nitens.
