= Maladera pseudonitens =

Scientific classification
- Kingdom: Animalia
- Phylum: Arthropoda
- Class: Insecta
- Order: Coleoptera
- Suborder: Polyphaga
- Infraorder: Scarabaeiformia
- Family: Scarabaeidae
- Genus: Maladera
- Species: M. pseudonitens

Binomial name
- Maladera pseudonitens Ahrens, Fabrizi & Liu, 2021

Species of beetle

Maladera pseudonitens is a species of beetle of the family Scarabaeidae. It is found in China (Guangdong, Hunan).

Adults reach a length of about 8.1 mm. They have a dark reddish brown, oblong-oval body. The antennae are yellow. They are shiny and the dorsal surface is nearly glabrous.

The species name is derived from Greek pseudo (meaning false) and the species name nitens and refers to its similarity to Maladera nitens.
