= Maladera nitens =

Scientific classification
- Kingdom: Animalia
- Phylum: Arthropoda
- Clade: Pancrustacea
- Class: Insecta
- Order: Coleoptera
- Suborder: Polyphaga
- Infraorder: Scarabaeiformia
- Family: Scarabaeidae
- Genus: Maladera
- Species: M. nitens

Binomial name
- Maladera nitens (Moser, 1915)

Synonyms
- Serica nitens Moser, 1915

Species of beetle

Maladera nitens is a species of beetle of the family Scarabaeidae. It is found in China (Fujian, Jiangxi, Zhejiang).

== Description ==
Adults reach a length of about 8.4 mm. They have a reddish brown, oblong-oval body. The antennae are yellow and they are mostly shiny, with the dorsal surface nearly glabrous.
