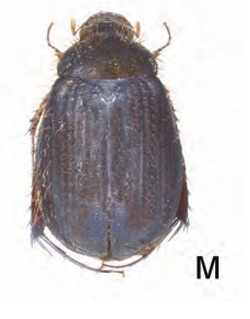

Scientific classification
- Kingdom: Animalia
- Phylum: Arthropoda
- Class: Insecta
- Order: Coleoptera
- Suborder: Polyphaga
- Infraorder: Scarabaeiformia
- Family: Scarabaeidae
- Genus: Maladera
- Species: M. antispinosa

Binomial name
- Maladera antispinosa Ahrens & Fabrizi, 2016

= Maladera antispinosa =

Species of beetle

Maladera antispinosa is a species of beetle of the family Scarabaeidae. It is found in Meghalaya, a state in northeast India.

== Description ==
Adults reach a length of about 10.6–11.1 mm. They have a dark brown, oblong-oval body. The antennae are yellowish. The upper surface is mostly dull, with numerous long setae on the head, pronotum and elytra

== Etymology ==
The species name refers to its high similarity to Maladera subspinosa, but with the presence of antisymmetric parameres. It is thus derived from the combined Latin words anti- (meaning against) and spinosus (meaning with spines).
