= Maladera pseudosenta =

Scientific classification
- Kingdom: Animalia
- Phylum: Arthropoda
- Class: Insecta
- Order: Coleoptera
- Suborder: Polyphaga
- Infraorder: Scarabaeiformia
- Family: Scarabaeidae
- Genus: Maladera
- Species: M. pseudosenta

Binomial name
- Maladera pseudosenta Ahrens, Fabrizi & Liu, 2021

Species of beetle

Maladera pseudosenta is a species of beetle of the family Scarabaeidae. It is found in China (Yunnan) and Laos.

== Description ==
Adults reach a length of about 9.4–10.5 mm. They have a dark brown, oblong-oval body. They are mostly dull (but the labroclypeus is shiny) and the dorsal surface is nearly glabrous.

== Etymology ==
The species name is derived from Greek pseudo (meaning false) and the species name senta and refers to its similarity to Maladera senta.
