= Maladera senta =

Scientific classification
- Kingdom: Animalia
- Phylum: Arthropoda
- Class: Insecta
- Order: Coleoptera
- Suborder: Polyphaga
- Infraorder: Scarabaeiformia
- Family: Scarabaeidae
- Genus: Maladera
- Species: M. senta

Binomial name
- Maladera senta (Brenske, 1898)

Synonyms
- Autoserica senta Brenske, 1898; Autoserica subspinosa Brenske, 1899

Species of beetle

Maladera senta is a species of beetle of the family Scarabaeidae. It is found in China (Fujian, Guangdong, Jiangxi, Shanghai, Yunnan), India (Uttarakhand, Meghalaya, Nagaland), Laos, Thailand and Vietnam.

== Description ==
Adults reach a length of about 8.8–10.1 mm. They have a blackish-brown to dark reddish-brown, oblong-oval body, sometimes with a greenish sheen. The upper surface is mostly dull and sparsely covered with moderately dense, erect and strong hairs.
