= Maladera freyi =

Scientific classification
- Kingdom: Animalia
- Phylum: Arthropoda
- Class: Insecta
- Order: Coleoptera
- Suborder: Polyphaga
- Infraorder: Scarabaeiformia
- Family: Scarabaeidae
- Genus: Maladera
- Species: M. freyi

Binomial name
- Maladera freyi Ahrens & Fabrizi, 2016

Synonyms
- Cephaloserica opaca Frey, 1975 (preocc.)

Species of beetle

Maladera freyi is a species of beetle of the family Scarabaeidae. It is found from eastern Nepal to Bhutan and in India (Bihar, Manipur, Meghalaya, West Bengal).

== Description ==
Adults reach a length of about 7–8.3 mm. They have a reddish to dark brown, oval body. The upper surface is mostly dull and glabrous, except for the lateral cilia of the pronotum and elytra.

== Taxonomy ==
Due to secondary homony with Maladera opaca, originally described as Autoserica opaca from Africa by Moser in 1924, the name Maladera opaca, originally described as Cephaloserica opaca by Frey in 1975, was replaced with the substitute name Maladera freyi by Ahrens and Fabrizi in 2016.
