= Maladera opaca =

Scientific classification
- Kingdom: Animalia
- Phylum: Arthropoda
- Clade: Pancrustacea
- Class: Insecta
- Order: Coleoptera
- Suborder: Polyphaga
- Infraorder: Scarabaeiformia
- Family: Scarabaeidae
- Genus: Maladera
- Species: M. opaca

Binomial name
- Maladera opaca (Moser, 1924)

Synonyms
- Autoserica opaca Moser, 1924

Species of beetle

Maladera opaca is a species of beetle of the family Scarabaeidae. It is found in Nigeria.

== Description ==
Adults reach a length of about 9 mm (0.35 in). They are similar in colour and shape to Neoserica benuensis, the clypeus however, is only slightly wrinkled, whereas in benuensis it is strongly wrinkled and punctate.
