= Neoserica benuensis =

Scientific classification
- Kingdom: Animalia
- Phylum: Arthropoda
- Class: Insecta
- Order: Coleoptera
- Suborder: Polyphaga
- Infraorder: Scarabaeiformia
- Family: Scarabaeidae
- Genus: Neoserica
- Species: N. benuensis

Binomial name
- Neoserica benuensis (Brenske, 1902)

Synonyms
- Autoserica benuensis Brenske, 1902

Species of beetle

Neoserica benuensis is a species of beetle of the family Scarabaeidae. It is found in Sudan and Cameroon.

== Description ==
Adults reach a length of about 6 mm. They have a reddish-brown, dull, short, oval body, with a faint silky sheen. The pronotum is very finely and densely punctate. The elytra show small, distinct rows of punctures. These punctures are densely and confusedly placed next to each other, leaving the slightly raised interstices less punctured. There are also tiny hairs and white setae present. The antennae are light yellow.
