= Maladera parobscurata =

Scientific classification
- Kingdom: Animalia
- Phylum: Arthropoda
- Class: Insecta
- Order: Coleoptera
- Suborder: Polyphaga
- Infraorder: Scarabaeiformia
- Family: Scarabaeidae
- Genus: Maladera
- Species: M. parobscurata

Binomial name
- Maladera parobscurata Ahrens, Fabrizi & Liu, 2021

Species of beetle

Maladera parobscurata is a species of beetle of the family Scarabaeidae. It is found in China (Sichuan, Yunnan).

== Description ==
Adults reach a length of about 6.7–7.6 mm. They have a dark brown, oval body. The antennae are yellow. The dorsal surface is dull and nearly glabrous, except for some single setae on the head.

== Etymology ==
The species name is derived from Greek para (meaning close by) and the species name obscurata and refers to the similarity to Maladera obscurata.
