= Maladera fereobscurata =

Scientific classification
- Kingdom: Animalia
- Phylum: Arthropoda
- Class: Insecta
- Order: Coleoptera
- Suborder: Polyphaga
- Infraorder: Scarabaeiformia
- Family: Scarabaeidae
- Genus: Maladera
- Species: M. fereobscurata

Binomial name
- Maladera fereobscurata Ahrens, Fabrizi & Liu, 2021

Species of beetle

Maladera fereobscurata is a species of beetle of the family Scarabaeidae. It is found in China (Yunnan), Laos, Myanmar, Thailand and Vietnam.

== Description ==
Adults reach a length of about 5.5–6.5 mm. They have a reddish brown, oval body. The antennae are yellow. The dorsal surface is dull and nearly glabrous, except for some single setae on the head.

== Etymology ==
The species name is derived from Latin fere (meaning nearly) and the species name obscurata and refers to the strong similarity to Maladera obscurata.
