= Maladera obscurata =

Scientific classification
- Kingdom: Animalia
- Phylum: Arthropoda
- Clade: Pancrustacea
- Class: Insecta
- Order: Coleoptera
- Suborder: Polyphaga
- Infraorder: Scarabaeiformia
- Family: Scarabaeidae
- Genus: Maladera
- Species: M. obscurata

Binomial name
- Maladera obscurata (Moser, 1915)

Synonyms
- Autoserica obscurata Moser, 1915

Species of beetle

Maladera obscurata is a species of beetle of the family Scarabaeidae. It is found in China (Sichuan, Yunnan), Laos and Thailand.

== Description ==
Adults reach a length of about 6.6 mm. They have a black, oval body. The antennae are yellow with a brown antennal club. The dorsal surface is dull with a weak iridescent shine and nearly glabrous, except for some single setae on the head.
