= Maladera palona =

Scientific classification
- Kingdom: Animalia
- Phylum: Arthropoda
- Class: Insecta
- Order: Coleoptera
- Suborder: Polyphaga
- Infraorder: Scarabaeiformia
- Family: Scarabaeidae
- Genus: Maladera
- Species: M. palona

Binomial name
- Maladera palona (Brenske, 1899)

Synonyms
- Autoserica palona Brenske, 1899

Species of beetle

Maladera palona is a species of beetle of the family Scarabaeidae. It is found in Myanmar.

== Description ==
Adults reach a length of about 7 mm. They are somewhat dark reddish-brown, dull and opalescent, with weak setae. They are very similar to Maladera peguana, but the hind femora are broadened to the apex but distinctly narrower and not rounded at the apex. The setae of the segments are weak. The elytra are more broadly and inconsistently punctate in the striae, so that the intervals appear narrow and somewhat raised. On the pygidium, the line is only indicated at the apex. The posterior angles of the pronotum are less rounded.
