= Maladera peguana =

Scientific classification
- Kingdom: Animalia
- Phylum: Arthropoda
- Class: Insecta
- Order: Coleoptera
- Suborder: Polyphaga
- Infraorder: Scarabaeiformia
- Family: Scarabaeidae
- Genus: Maladera
- Species: M. peguana

Binomial name
- Maladera peguana (Brenske, 1899)

Synonyms
- Autoserica peguana Brenske, 1899

Species of beetle

Maladera peguana is a species of beetle of the family Scarabaeidae. It is found in Myanmar.

== Description ==
Adults reach a length of about 7 mm. They are reddish-brown, dull, opalescent and weak setae. The clypeus is broad, tapering anteriorly, weakly margined, widely punctate, the intervals shiny, with a slight elevation in the middle. The suture is fine but sharp, the frons finely punctate. The pronotum is almost straight laterally, the setae short, the posterior angles rounded, finely and rather densely punctate, with minute hairs, the anterior margin not curved outwards in the middle. The elytra are striated by deep punctures arranged in rows at regular intervals. Between these are coarse but less deep punctures bearing a minute hair, more or less densely spaced, so that the intervals appear evenly punctate here, and the rows extend only on the single punctate striae. The marginal setae are short, with a short seta here and there next to the margin. The pygidium is pointed, very dense, rather coarsely punctate with a midline free of punctures, and has tiny but distinct hairs.
