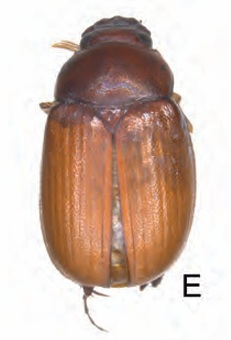

Scientific classification
- Kingdom: Animalia
- Phylum: Arthropoda
- Class: Insecta
- Order: Coleoptera
- Suborder: Polyphaga
- Infraorder: Scarabaeiformia
- Family: Scarabaeidae
- Genus: Maladera
- Species: M. bombycinoides

Binomial name
- Maladera bombycinoides Ahrens & Fabrizi, 2016

= Maladera bombycinoides =

Species of beetle

Maladera bombycinoides is a species of beetle of the family Scarabaeidae. It is found in India (Andhra Pradesh, Karnataka).

== Description ==
Adults reach a length of about 7.3 mm. They have a reddish brown, oblong-oval body, with the elytra slightly lighter and the antennae yellowish. The dorsal surface has some iridescent shine and is glabrous, except for a few short setae on sides of the elytra.

== Etymology ==
The species name refers to its similarity to Maladera bombycina and is derived from the combined species name bombycina and the Greek suffix -oides (meaning like).
