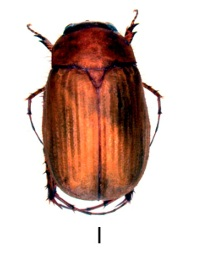

Scientific classification
- Kingdom: Animalia
- Phylum: Arthropoda
- Class: Insecta
- Order: Coleoptera
- Suborder: Polyphaga
- Infraorder: Scarabaeiformia
- Family: Scarabaeidae
- Genus: Maladera
- Species: M. bombycina

Binomial name
- Maladera bombycina (Karsch, 1882)

Synonyms
- Serica bombycina Karsch, 1882; Neoserica bombycina; Serica quadriflabellata Brenske, 1896; Neoserica quadriflabellata; Neoserica sericata Brenske, 1898

= Maladera bombycina =

Species of beetle

Maladera bombycina is a species of beetle of the family Scarabaeidae. It is found in Myanmar, southern India and Sri Lanka.

== Description ==
Adults reach a length of about 7 mm. They have a yellowish brown, oval body, with yellowish antennae. The head is shiny, while the dorsal surface is dull and nearly glabrous.
