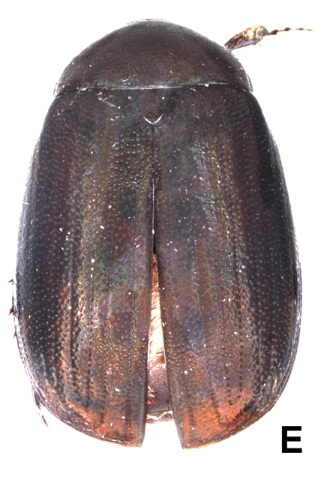

Scientific classification
- Kingdom: Animalia
- Phylum: Arthropoda
- Clade: Pancrustacea
- Class: Insecta
- Order: Coleoptera
- Suborder: Polyphaga
- Infraorder: Scarabaeiformia
- Family: Scarabaeidae
- Genus: Maladera
- Species: M. alloservitrita

Binomial name
- Maladera alloservitrita Sreedevi, Speer, Fabrizi & Ahrens, 2018

= Maladera alloservitrita =

Species of beetle

Maladera alloservitrita is a species of beetle of the family Scarabaeidae. It is found in India (Mizoram).

== Description ==
Adults reach a length of about 7.5 mm. They have an uniformly dark brown, oval body. The dorsal and ventral surface are dull, while the head and anterior pronotum are moderately shiny. They are nearly glabrous, except for the lateral setae of the elytra and pronotum.

== Etymology ==
The species name is derived from Greek allo (meaning other) and the name servitrita and refers to the high similarity to the closely related species Maladera servitrita.
