= Maladera servitrita =

Scientific classification
- Kingdom: Animalia
- Phylum: Arthropoda
- Class: Insecta
- Order: Coleoptera
- Suborder: Polyphaga
- Infraorder: Scarabaeiformia
- Family: Scarabaeidae
- Genus: Maladera
- Species: M. servitrita

Binomial name
- Maladera servitrita (Brenske, 1898)

Synonyms
- Autoserica servitrita Brenske, 1898

Species of beetle

Maladera servitrita is a species of beetle of the family Scarabaeidae. It is found in India (Assam, Meghalaya, Arunachal Pradesh).

== Description ==
Adults reach a length of about 8.4–8.7 mm. They have a dark reddish-brown, oval body. The upper surface is mostly dull and glabrous, except for the lateral cilia of the pronotum and elytra.
