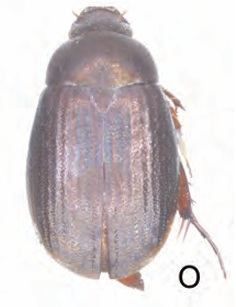

Scientific classification
- Kingdom: Animalia
- Phylum: Arthropoda
- Class: Insecta
- Order: Coleoptera
- Suborder: Polyphaga
- Infraorder: Scarabaeiformia
- Family: Scarabaeidae
- Genus: Maladera
- Species: M. ferekanarana

Binomial name
- Maladera ferekanarana Ahrens & Fabrizi, 2016

= Maladera ferekanarana =

Species of beetle

Maladera ferekanarana is a species of beetle of the family Scarabaeidae. It is found in India (Karnataka, Maharashtra, Tamil Nadu).

== Description ==
Adults reach a length of about 9.6–11.5 mm. They have a dark brown, oblong-oval body with yellowish antennae. They are mostly dull and the dorsal surface is nearly glabrous, except for some setae on the head and elytra.

== Etymology ==
The species name is derived from Latin fere (meaning almost or about) and kanarana and refers to the strong similarity to Maladera kanarana.
