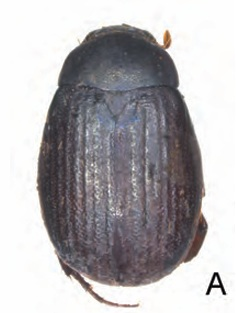

Scientific classification
- Kingdom: Animalia
- Phylum: Arthropoda
- Clade: Pancrustacea
- Class: Insecta
- Order: Coleoptera
- Suborder: Polyphaga
- Infraorder: Scarabaeiformia
- Family: Scarabaeidae
- Genus: Maladera
- Species: M. kanarana

Binomial name
- Maladera kanarana (Moser, 1918)

Synonyms
- Autoserica kanarana Moser, 1918

= Maladera kanarana =

Species of beetle

Maladera kanarana is a species of beetle of the family Scarabaeidae. It is found in India (Karnataka, Maharashtra).

== Description ==
Adults reach a length of about 7.7 mm. They have a dark brown, oblong-oval body with yellowish antennae. They are mostly dull and the dorsal surface is nearly glabrous, except for some setae on the head and elytra.
