= Maladera trilobata =

Scientific classification
- Kingdom: Animalia
- Phylum: Arthropoda
- Class: Insecta
- Order: Coleoptera
- Suborder: Polyphaga
- Infraorder: Scarabaeiformia
- Family: Scarabaeidae
- Genus: Maladera
- Species: M. trilobata

Binomial name
- Maladera trilobata (Khan & Ghai, 1980)

Synonyms
- Hemiserica trilobata Khan & Ghai, 1980

Species of beetle

Maladera trilobata is a species of beetle of the family Scarabaeidae. It is found in India (Maharashtra).

== Taxonomy ==
This species might be an aberrant form of Maladera nasuta, but further research is needed to clarify the status of this species.
