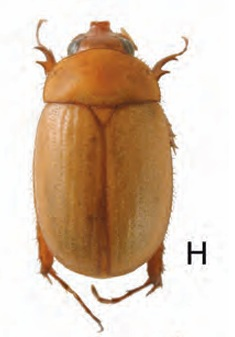

Scientific classification
- Kingdom: Animalia
- Phylum: Arthropoda
- Class: Insecta
- Order: Coleoptera
- Suborder: Polyphaga
- Infraorder: Scarabaeiformia
- Family: Scarabaeidae
- Genus: Maladera
- Species: M. nasuta

Binomial name
- Maladera nasuta (Brenske, 1894)

Synonyms
- Hemiserica nasuta Brenske, 1894; Hemiserica mayarami Khan & Ghai, 1980; Rhynchosymmela pallida Frey, 1974; Hemiserica clypeata Brenske, 1894

= Maladera nasuta =

Species of beetle

Maladera nasuta is a species of beetle of the family Scarabaeidae. It is found in India (Jammu & Kashmir, Uttarakhand, Haryana, Rajasthan).

== Description ==
Adults reach a length of about 5.5–6.3 mm. They have a yellowish-brown, oval body, while the head and pronotum are light reddish-brown. The upper surface is mostly dull and glabrous, except for some setae on the head and the lateral cilia of the pronotum and elytra.
