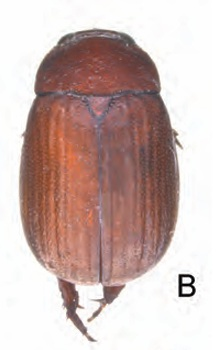

Scientific classification
- Kingdom: Animalia
- Phylum: Arthropoda
- Class: Insecta
- Order: Coleoptera
- Suborder: Polyphaga
- Infraorder: Scarabaeiformia
- Family: Scarabaeidae
- Genus: Maladera
- Species: M. allolaterita

Binomial name
- Maladera allolaterita Ahrens & Fabrizi, 2016

= Maladera allolaterita =

Species of beetle

Maladera allolaterita is a species of beetle of the family Scarabaeidae. It is found in India (Tamil Nadu).

== Description ==
Adults reach a length of about 7.5 mm. They have a reddish brown, oblong-oval body, with the elytra slightly lighter and the antennae yellowish. They are mostly dull and glabrous, except for a few short setae on the sides of the elytra.

== Etymology ==
The species name is derived from Greek allo and the species name laterita and refers to its similarity to Maladera laterita.
