= Maladera lateritia =

Scientific classification
- Kingdom: Animalia
- Phylum: Arthropoda
- Clade: Pancrustacea
- Class: Insecta
- Order: Coleoptera
- Suborder: Polyphaga
- Infraorder: Scarabaeiformia
- Family: Scarabaeidae
- Genus: Maladera
- Species: M. lateritia

Binomial name
- Maladera lateritia (Moser, 1915)

Synonyms
- Serica lateritia Moser, 1915

Species of beetle

Maladera lateritia is a species of beetle of the family Scarabaeidae. It is found in India (Karnataka, Tamil Nadu, Andhra Pradesh).

== Description ==
Adults reach a length of about 8.1 mm. They have a reddish brown, oblong-oval body, with the elytra slightly lighter and the antennae yellowish. The dorsal surface is mostly dull and nearly glabrous, except for a few short setae on sides of the elytra.
