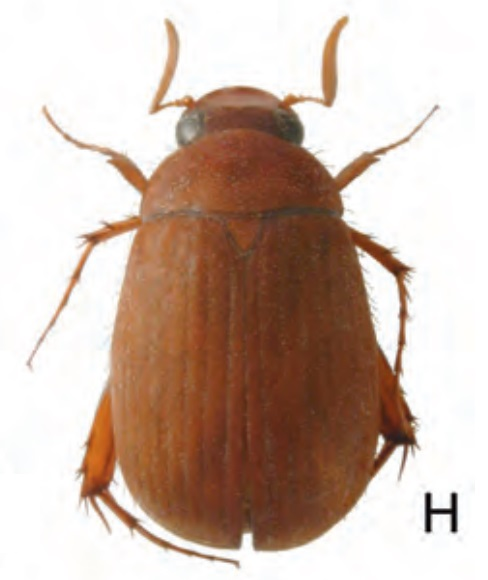

Scientific classification
- Kingdom: Animalia
- Phylum: Arthropoda
- Class: Insecta
- Order: Coleoptera
- Suborder: Polyphaga
- Infraorder: Scarabaeiformia
- Family: Scarabaeidae
- Genus: Maladera
- Species: M. ferruginea

Binomial name
- Maladera ferruginea (Kollar & Redtenbacher, 1848)

Synonyms
- Serica ferruginea Kollar & Redtenbacher, 1848; Omaloplia punctifrons Dejean, 1836

= Maladera ferruginea =

Species of beetle

Maladera ferruginea is a species of beetle of the family Scarabaeidae. It is found in India (Himachal Pradesh, Jammu & Kashmir, Uttarakhand, Uttar Pradesh), Nepal and Pakistan.

== Description ==
Adults reach a length of about 8–8.6 mm. They have a reddish-brown, oval body. The upper surface is mostly dull and glabrous, except for some setae on the head and the lateral cilia of the pronotum and elytra.
