= Maladera pseudofuscipes =

Scientific classification
- Kingdom: Animalia
- Phylum: Arthropoda
- Class: Insecta
- Order: Coleoptera
- Suborder: Polyphaga
- Infraorder: Scarabaeiformia
- Family: Scarabaeidae
- Genus: Maladera
- Species: M. pseudofuscipes

Binomial name
- Maladera pseudofuscipes Ahrens, Fabrizi & Liu, 2021

Species of beetle

Maladera pseudofuscipes is a species of beetle of the family Scarabaeidae. It is found in Vietnam and China (Yunnan).

== Description ==
Adults reach a length of about 5.9 mm. They have a black to dark reddish brown, oval body. The club of the antennae is yellowish and parts of the pronotum and head have a greenish shine. The dorsal surface is dull and, except for some single setae on the head, nearly glabrous.

== Etymology ==
The species name is derived from Greek pseudo (meaning false) and the species name fuscipes and refers to its similarity to Maladera fuscipes.
