= Maladera fuscipes =

Scientific classification
- Kingdom: Animalia
- Phylum: Arthropoda
- Clade: Pancrustacea
- Class: Insecta
- Order: Coleoptera
- Suborder: Polyphaga
- Infraorder: Scarabaeiformia
- Family: Scarabaeidae
- Genus: Maladera
- Species: M. fuscipes

Binomial name
- Maladera fuscipes (Moser, 1915)

Synonyms
- Autoserica fuscipes Moser, 1915

Species of beetle

Maladera fuscipes is a species of beetle of the family Scarabaeidae. It is found in China (Fujian, Guangxi, Guizhou, Jiangxi, Yunnan), Laos and Vietnam.

== Description ==
Adults reach a length of about 5.4 mm. They have a black to dark reddish brown, oval body. The club of the antennae is yellowish and parts of the pronotum and head have a greenish shine. The dorsal surface is dull and, except for some single setae on the head, nearly glabrous.
