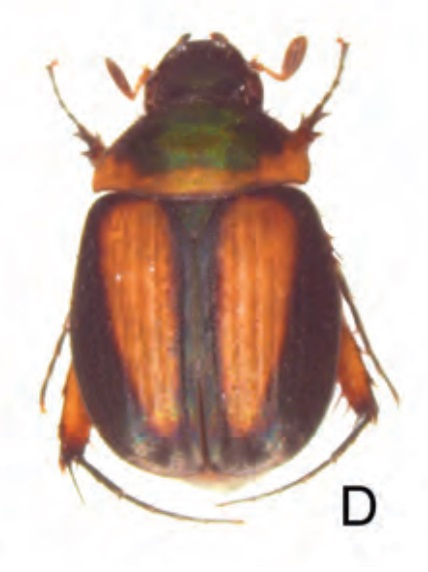

Scientific classification
- Kingdom: Animalia
- Phylum: Arthropoda
- Class: Insecta
- Order: Coleoptera
- Suborder: Polyphaga
- Infraorder: Scarabaeiformia
- Family: Scarabaeidae
- Genus: Maladera
- Species: M. xanthoptera

Binomial name
- Maladera xanthoptera Ahrens & Fabrizi, 2016

= Maladera xanthoptera =

Species of beetle

Maladera xanthoptera is a species of beetle of the family Scarabaeidae. It is found in India (Meghalaya).

== Description ==
Adults reach a length of about 5.8–6.1 mm. They have a yellowish brown, oval body. The head, club of the antennae, anterior portion and disc of the pronotum, margins of the elytra and ventral surface are all dark brown to black, the dark parts of the pronotum and head with a greenish shine. The dorsal surface is dull and nearly glabrous, except for some setae on the head.

== Etymology ==
The species name is derived from the Latinised Greek words xanthos (meaning yellow) and pteron (meaning wing) and refers to the yellow elytra.
