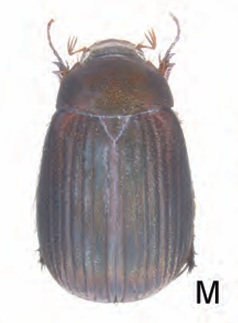

Scientific classification
- Kingdom: Animalia
- Phylum: Arthropoda
- Class: Insecta
- Order: Coleoptera
- Suborder: Polyphaga
- Infraorder: Scarabaeiformia
- Family: Scarabaeidae
- Genus: Maladera
- Species: M. paraprabangana

Binomial name
- Maladera paraprabangana Ahrens & Fabrizi, 2016

= Maladera paraprabangana =

Species of beetle

Maladera paraprabangana is a species of beetle of the family Scarabaeidae. It is found in India (Meghalaya, Mizoram).

== Description ==
Adults reach a length of about 12.1–12.8 mm. They have a dark brown, oval body. The dorsal surface is mostly dull and nearly glabrous, except for the lateral setae of the pronotum and elytra and a few setae on the head.

== Etymology ==
The species name is derived from Greek para- (meaning beside or close) and the species name prabangana and refers to its similarity to Maladera prabangana.
