= Maladera prabangana =

Scientific classification
- Kingdom: Animalia
- Phylum: Arthropoda
- Class: Insecta
- Order: Coleoptera
- Suborder: Polyphaga
- Infraorder: Scarabaeiformia
- Family: Scarabaeidae
- Genus: Maladera
- Species: M. prabangana

Binomial name
- Maladera prabangana (Brenske, 1899)

Synonyms
- Autoserica prabangana Brenske, 1899

Species of beetle

Maladera prabangana is a species of beetle of the family Scarabaeidae. It is found in Laos.

== Description ==
Adults reach a length of about 11 mm. They have a piceous-black, ovate, opaque body.
