= Maladera sancta =

Scientific classification
- Kingdom: Animalia
- Phylum: Arthropoda
- Class: Insecta
- Order: Coleoptera
- Suborder: Polyphaga
- Infraorder: Scarabaeiformia
- Family: Scarabaeidae
- Genus: Maladera
- Species: M. sancta

Binomial name
- Maladera sancta (Brenske, 1899)

Synonyms
- Autoserica sancta Brenske, 1899

Species of beetle

Maladera sancta is a species of beetle of the family Scarabaeidae. It is found in Indonesia (Java).

== Description ==
Adults reach a length of about 9 mm. They are similar to Maladera malaya They are dark brown and quite strongly opalescent. The elytra are more densely and coarsely punctate than in M. malaya.
