= Maladera malaya =

Scientific classification
- Kingdom: Animalia
- Phylum: Arthropoda
- Class: Insecta
- Order: Coleoptera
- Suborder: Polyphaga
- Infraorder: Scarabaeiformia
- Family: Scarabaeidae
- Genus: Maladera
- Species: M. malaya

Binomial name
- Maladera malaya (Brenske, 1899)

Synonyms
- Autoserica malaya Brenske, 1899

Species of beetle

Maladera malaya is a species of beetle of the family Scarabaeidae. It is found in Indonesia (Java).

== Description ==
Adults reach a length of about 11 mm. They are oblong oval, dull, barely opalescent and reddish-brown (somewhat darker on the upper side). The middle of the chest is densely haired. The pronotum is distinctly transverse, not projecting anteriorly in the middle, the sides almost straight, with distinct setae and broadly rounded posterior angles, with tiny, barely perceptible hairs in the punctures. The elytra are punctate in rows. These punctures are larger and denser than the widely spaced punctures of the intervals, which bear tiny hairs and scattered setae with fine setae.
