= Maladera paranantouensis =

Scientific classification
- Kingdom: Animalia
- Phylum: Arthropoda
- Class: Insecta
- Order: Coleoptera
- Suborder: Polyphaga
- Infraorder: Scarabaeiformia
- Family: Scarabaeidae
- Genus: Maladera
- Species: M. paranantouensis

Binomial name
- Maladera paranantouensis Kobayashi, 2022

Species of beetle

Maladera paranantouensis is a species of beetle of the family Scarabaeidae. It is found in Taiwan.

== Description ==
Adults reach a length of about 11—11.5 mm. They have an oblong-oval, dark reddish brown to blackish brown body, with yellowish brown antennae. The ventral surface and legs are reddish brown to dark reddish brown and the elytral suture and lateral margins are slightly reddish. The dorsal and ventral sides are almost opaque.

== Etymology ==
The species name refers to its close resemblance to Maladera nantouensis.
