= Maladera nantouensis =

Scientific classification
- Kingdom: Animalia
- Phylum: Arthropoda
- Class: Insecta
- Order: Coleoptera
- Suborder: Polyphaga
- Infraorder: Scarabaeiformia
- Family: Scarabaeidae
- Genus: Maladera
- Species: M. nantouensis

Binomial name
- Maladera nantouensis Kobayashi, 2022

Species of beetle

Maladera nantouensis is a species of beetle of the family Scarabaeidae. It is found in Taiwan.

== Description ==
Adults reach a length of about 11—11.5 mm. They have an oblong-oval body. The dorsal surface is dark reddish brown to blackish brown and the antennae are dark yellowish brown. The ventral surface and legs are reddish brown to dark reddish brown. Both the dorsal and ventral sides are almost opaque, while the legs are shining.

== Etymology ==
The species is named after the type locality, Nantou County, Central Taiwan.
