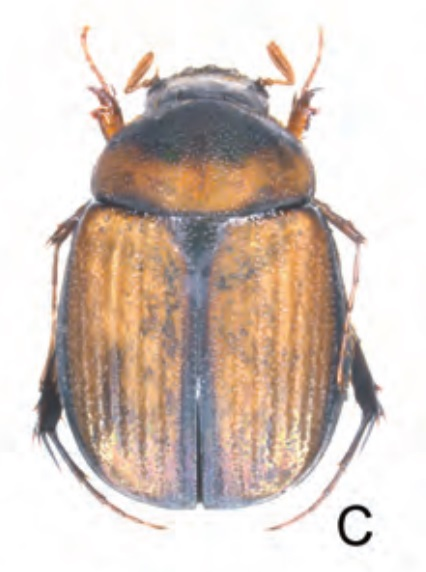

Scientific classification
- Kingdom: Animalia
- Phylum: Arthropoda
- Clade: Pancrustacea
- Class: Insecta
- Order: Coleoptera
- Suborder: Polyphaga
- Infraorder: Scarabaeiformia
- Family: Scarabaeidae
- Genus: Maladera
- Species: M. satrapa

Binomial name
- Maladera satrapa (Brenske, 1898)

Synonyms
- Autoserica satrapa Brenske, 1898

= Maladera satrapa =

Species of beetle

Maladera satrapa is a species of beetle of the family Scarabaeidae. It is found in India (Assam, Manipur, Meghalaya, Nagaland), Myanmar and Thailand.

== Description ==
Adults reach a length of about 5.7–6.4 mm. The ventral side, head and margins of the elytra are black, while the legs, antennae, remainder of the elytra and part of the pronotum are yellowish brown. The dark areas may have a greenish shine. Most of the dorsal surface is nearly glabrous.
