= Maladera pseudoconsularis =

Scientific classification
- Kingdom: Animalia
- Phylum: Arthropoda
- Class: Insecta
- Order: Coleoptera
- Suborder: Polyphaga
- Infraorder: Scarabaeiformia
- Family: Scarabaeidae
- Genus: Maladera
- Species: M. pseudoconsularis

Binomial name
- Maladera pseudoconsularis Ahrens, Fabrizi & Liu, 2021

Species of beetle

Maladera pseudoconsularis is a species of beetle of the family Scarabaeidae. It is found in China (Yunnan).

== Description ==
Adults reach a length of about 8 mm. They have an oblong-oval body. The dorsal surface is dark brown and dull, while the ventral surface is reddish brown. The antennae are yellow. Except for some single setae on the head, the dorsal surface is nearly glabrous.

== Etymology ==
The species name is derived from Greek pseudo (meaning similar) and the species name consularis and refers to its similarity to Maladera consularis.
