= Maladera consularis =

Scientific classification
- Kingdom: Animalia
- Phylum: Arthropoda
- Class: Insecta
- Order: Coleoptera
- Suborder: Polyphaga
- Infraorder: Scarabaeiformia
- Family: Scarabaeidae
- Genus: Maladera
- Species: M. consularis

Binomial name
- Maladera consularis Ahrens & Fabrizi, 2009

Species of beetle

Maladera consularis is a species of beetle of the family Scarabaeidae. It is found in India (Arunachal Pradesh).

== Description ==
Adults reach a length of about 7.4–7.6 mm. They have a dark reddish brown, oval body. The antennae and legs are yellowish. The dorsal surface is mostly dull and sparsely setose.

== Etymology ==
The species name is derived from Latin consularis (meaning stately) and refers to the formidably complex shape of the male genitalia.
