= Maladera inornata =

Scientific classification
- Kingdom: Animalia
- Phylum: Arthropoda
- Class: Insecta
- Order: Coleoptera
- Suborder: Polyphaga
- Infraorder: Scarabaeiformia
- Family: Scarabaeidae
- Genus: Maladera
- Species: M. inornata

Binomial name
- Maladera inornata (Brenske, 1899)

Synonyms
- Autoserica inornata Brenske, 1899

Species of beetle

Maladera inornata is a species of beetle of the family Scarabaeidae. It is found in Indonesia (Java).

== Description ==
Adults reach a length of about 6 mm. They are dull, yellowish-brown, and faintly opalescent. They are very similar to Maladera femorata, but can be clearly distinguished by its narrow hind femora and tibiae. The pronotum is not projecting anteriorly, the sides are straight and slightly rounded posteriorly, short. The elytra are distinctly punctate.
