= Maladera femorata =

Scientific classification
- Kingdom: Animalia
- Phylum: Arthropoda
- Class: Insecta
- Order: Coleoptera
- Suborder: Polyphaga
- Infraorder: Scarabaeiformia
- Family: Scarabaeidae
- Genus: Maladera
- Species: M. femorata

Binomial name
- Maladera femorata (Brenske, 1899)

Synonyms
- Autoserica femorata Brenske, 1899

Species of beetle

Maladera femorata is a species of beetle of the family Scarabaeidae. It is found in Indonesia (Java).

== Description ==
Adults reach a length of about 7 mm. They are brown, dull and opalescent. The pronotum is not projecting forward in the middle at the front, somewhat rounded anteriorly at the sides, straight posteriorly, strongly convex. The elytra are coarsely punctate in rows, with individual long setae beside the lateral margin, and a dense row of setae on the lateral margin.
