= Maladera parabikouensis =

Scientific classification
- Kingdom: Animalia
- Phylum: Arthropoda
- Class: Insecta
- Order: Coleoptera
- Suborder: Polyphaga
- Infraorder: Scarabaeiformia
- Family: Scarabaeidae
- Genus: Maladera
- Species: M. parabikouensis

Binomial name
- Maladera parabikouensis Zhao & Ahrens, 2023

Species of beetle

Maladera parabikouensis is a species of beetle of the family Scarabaeidae. It is found in China (Guangdong).

== Description ==
Adults reach a length of about 12.6 mm. They have a reddish brown and iridescent, ovoid body. The abdomen and legs have a distinct iridescence. The apical half of thelabroclypeus, antennae and legs are reddish brown.

== Etymology ==
The species name is derived from Greek para (meaning resembling) and the species name bikouensis and refers to the similarity between the species and Maladera bikouensis.
