= Maladera paraserripes =

Scientific classification
- Kingdom: Animalia
- Phylum: Arthropoda
- Class: Insecta
- Order: Coleoptera
- Suborder: Polyphaga
- Infraorder: Scarabaeiformia
- Family: Scarabaeidae
- Genus: Maladera
- Species: M. paraserripes

Binomial name
- Maladera paraserripes Ahrens, Fabrizi & Liu, 2021

Species of beetle

Maladera paraserripes is a species of beetle of the family Scarabaeidae. It is found in China (Fujian).

== Description ==
Adults reach a length of about 7.5 mm. They have a reddish brown, oval body. The head is darker and the antennae are yellowish. The dorsal surface is dull (but the labroclypeus, tarsomeres, and tibiae are shiny) and glabrous.

== Etymology ==
The species name is derived from Greek para (meaning false) and the species name serripes and refers to its similarity to Maladera serripes.
