= Maladera serripes =

Scientific classification
- Kingdom: Animalia
- Phylum: Arthropoda
- Clade: Pancrustacea
- Class: Insecta
- Order: Coleoptera
- Suborder: Polyphaga
- Infraorder: Scarabaeiformia
- Family: Scarabaeidae
- Genus: Maladera
- Species: M. serripes

Binomial name
- Maladera serripes (Moser, 1915)

Synonyms
- Serica serripes Moser, 1915

Species of beetle

Maladera serripes is a species of beetle of the family Scarabaeidae. It is found in China (Fujian, Hubei, Jiangxi, Zhejiang).

== Description ==
Adults reach a length of about 7.6 mm. They have a reddish brown, oval body. The head is darker and the antennae are yellowish. The dorsal surface is dull (but the labroclypeus, tarsomeres, and tibiae are shiny) and glabrous.
