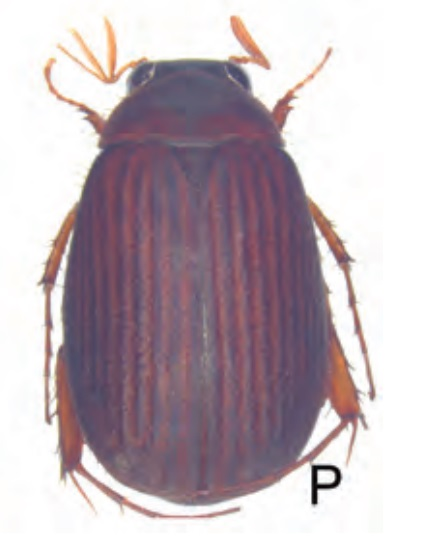

Scientific classification
- Kingdom: Animalia
- Phylum: Arthropoda
- Class: Insecta
- Order: Coleoptera
- Suborder: Polyphaga
- Infraorder: Scarabaeiformia
- Family: Scarabaeidae
- Genus: Maladera
- Species: M. declarata

Binomial name
- Maladera declarata Ahrens & Fabrizi, 2016

= Maladera declarata =

Species of beetle

Maladera declarata is a species of beetle of the family Scarabaeidae. It is found in India (Meghalaya, Mizoram).

== Description ==
Adults reach a length of about 7.5–8 mm. They have an oblong-oval body. The dorsal surface is dark brown, while the ventral surface is dark reddish brown and mostly dull, while the head is moderately shiny. Furthermore, the dorsal surface is nearly glabrous, except for some setae on the head.

== Etymology ==
The species name is derived from Latin declaratus (meaning declared) and refers to its impressive differences in the aedeagus from the other species of the group.
