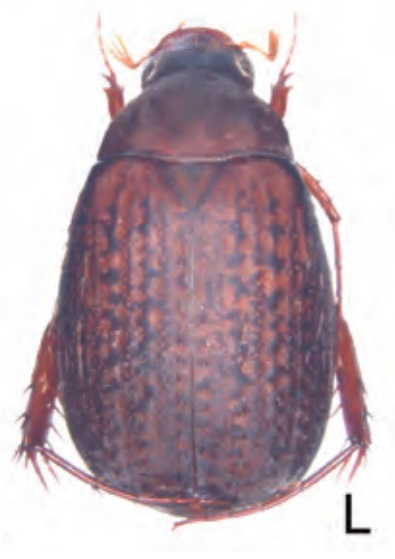

Scientific classification
- Kingdom: Animalia
- Phylum: Arthropoda
- Clade: Pancrustacea
- Class: Insecta
- Order: Coleoptera
- Suborder: Polyphaga
- Infraorder: Scarabaeiformia
- Family: Scarabaeidae
- Genus: Maladera
- Species: M. seriatoguttata

Binomial name
- Maladera seriatoguttata Ahrens & Fabrizi, 2016

= Maladera seriatoguttata =

Species of beetle

Maladera seriatoguttata is a species of beetle in the family Scarabaeidae. It is found in India (Karnataka, Kerala, Maharashtra).

== Description ==
Adults reach a length of about 7.7–8.9 mm. They have a dark brown, oval body. The ventral surface, including the legs, is reddish brown, while the antennae are yellow. Most of the dorsal surface is dull, with moderately dense and erect long setae on the head, pronotum and elytra.

== Etymology ==
The species name is derived from Latin seriatus (meaning in rows) and guttatus (meaning spotted).
