= Maladera paradetersa =

Scientific classification
- Kingdom: Animalia
- Phylum: Arthropoda
- Class: Insecta
- Order: Coleoptera
- Suborder: Polyphaga
- Infraorder: Scarabaeiformia
- Family: Scarabaeidae
- Genus: Maladera
- Species: M. paradetersa

Binomial name
- Maladera paradetersa Ahrens, Fabrizi & Liu, 2021

Species of beetle

Maladera paradetersa is a species of beetle of the family Scarabaeidae. It is found in China (Fujian).

== Description ==
Adults reach a length of about 6.8–7.2 mm. They have a yellowish brown, oblong-oval body. The antennae are yellow. They are shiny and the dorsal surface is nearly glabrous.

== Etymology ==
The species name is derived from Greek para (meaning close by) and the species name detersa and refers to the similarity to Maladera detersa.
