= Maladera detersa =

Scientific classification
- Kingdom: Animalia
- Phylum: Arthropoda
- Class: Insecta
- Order: Coleoptera
- Suborder: Polyphaga
- Infraorder: Scarabaeiformia
- Family: Scarabaeidae
- Genus: Maladera
- Species: M. detersa

Binomial name
- Maladera detersa (Erichson, 1834)

Synonyms
- Serica detersa Erichson, 1834

Species of beetle

Maladera detersa is a species of beetle of the family Scarabaeidae. It is found in China (Guangdong, Guangxi) and Vietnam.

== Description ==
Adults reach a length of about 6.7-8.2 mm. They have an oval, reddish brown to yellowish brown body. The upper surface is strongly glossy and glabrous, except for a few individual hairs on the head, the lateral elytral intervals and the hairs along the lateral margin of the pronotum and elytra.
