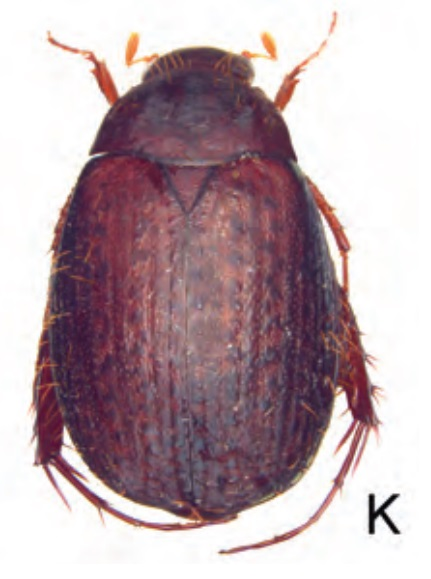

Scientific classification
- Kingdom: Animalia
- Phylum: Arthropoda
- Class: Insecta
- Order: Coleoptera
- Suborder: Polyphaga
- Infraorder: Scarabaeiformia
- Family: Scarabaeidae
- Genus: Maladera
- Species: M. granigera

Binomial name
- Maladera granigera Ahrens & Fabrizi, 2016

= Maladera granigera =

Species of beetle

Maladera granigera is a species of beetle of the family Scarabaeidae. It is found in India (Kerala).

== Description ==
Adults reach a length of about 8.2 mm. They have a dark brown, oval body. The ventral surface, including the legs, is reddish brown, while the antennae are yellow. Most of the dorsal surface is dull, with moderately dense and erect long setae on the head, pronotum and elytra.

== Etymology ==
The species name is derived from Latin granigerus (meaning bearing small tubercles).
