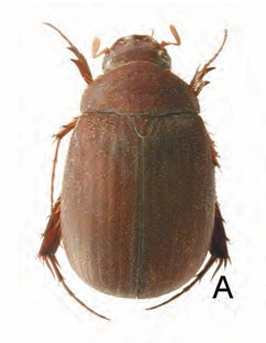

Scientific classification
- Kingdom: Animalia
- Phylum: Arthropoda
- Class: Insecta
- Order: Coleoptera
- Suborder: Polyphaga
- Infraorder: Scarabaeiformia
- Family: Scarabaeidae
- Genus: Maladera
- Species: M. affinis

Binomial name
- Maladera affinis (Blanchard, 1850)

Synonyms
- Emphania affinis Blanchard, 1850; Serica moreli Coquerel, 1866; Autoserica lahulensis Moser, 1919; Autoserica calcuttae Brenske, 1899

= Maladera affinis =

Species of beetle

Maladera affinis is a species of beetle of the family Scarabaeidae. It is found in India (Jammu & Kashmir, Uttarakhand, Assam, Bihar, Tripura, Uttar Pradesh, West Bengal), Nepal, Pakistan, Bangladesh and Myanmar. It is an introduced species in La Réunion and Madagascar.

== Description ==
Adults reach a length of about 7.5 mm. They have an ovate, reddish-brown, dull and opalescent body. The frons is finely punctate. The pronotum is straight anteriorly in the middle with angularly protruding anterior angles, the lateral margin slightly curved anteriorly, straight posteriorly with slightly rounded posterior angles, the surface finely punctate. The scutellum has fine hairs. The elytra are punctate in rows, with very slightly raised intervals. The abdomen has distinct rows of setae.
