= Maladera paradaanensis =

Scientific classification
- Kingdom: Animalia
- Phylum: Arthropoda
- Class: Insecta
- Order: Coleoptera
- Suborder: Polyphaga
- Infraorder: Scarabaeiformia
- Family: Scarabaeidae
- Genus: Maladera
- Species: M. paradaanensis

Binomial name
- Maladera paradaanensis Liu, Ahrens, Li & Yang, 2024

Species of beetle

Maladera paradaanensis is a species of beetle of the family Scarabaeidae. It is found in China (Guangdong).

== Description ==
Adults reach a length of about 8.8 mm. They have a dark reddish brown, oblong-oval body, with yellowish brown antennae. They are shiny and the dorsal surface is nearly glabrous.

== Etymology ==
The species name is derived from Greek para- (meaning false) and the species name daanensis and refers to its similarity to Maladera daanensis.
