= Maladera daanensis =

Scientific classification
- Kingdom: Animalia
- Phylum: Arthropoda
- Class: Insecta
- Order: Coleoptera
- Suborder: Polyphaga
- Infraorder: Scarabaeiformia
- Family: Scarabaeidae
- Genus: Maladera
- Species: M. daanensis

Binomial name
- Maladera daanensis Ahrens, Fabrizi & Liu, 2021

Species of beetle

Maladera daanensis is a species of beetle of the family Scarabaeidae. It is found in China (Fujian, Guangdong, Guangxi, Jiangxi).

== Description ==
Adults reach a length of about 7.6–9 mm. They have a dark reddish brown, oblong-oval body. The antennae are yellow. They are shiny and the dorsal surface is nearly glabrous.

== Etymology ==
The species is named after its type locality, Da’an.
