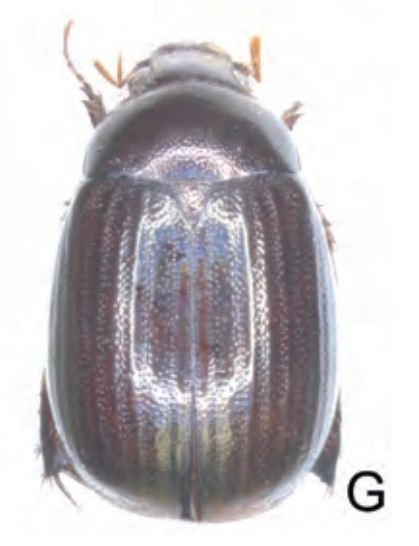

Scientific classification
- Kingdom: Animalia
- Phylum: Arthropoda
- Class: Insecta
- Order: Coleoptera
- Suborder: Polyphaga
- Infraorder: Scarabaeiformia
- Family: Scarabaeidae
- Genus: Maladera
- Species: M. nigrolucida

Binomial name
- Maladera nigrolucida Ahrens & Fabrizi, 2016

= Maladera nigrolucida =

Species of beetle

Maladera nigrolucida is a species of beetle of the family Scarabaeidae. It is found in India (Kerala).

== Description ==
Adults reach a length of about 9.2–9.7 mm. They have a blackish brown, oval body. The dorsal and ventral surface are both shiny and nearly glabrous, except for the lateral setae on the elytra and pronotum.

== Etymology ==
The species name is derived from Latin nigris (meaning black) and lucidus (meaning shiny) and refers to the black and shiny dorsal surface.
