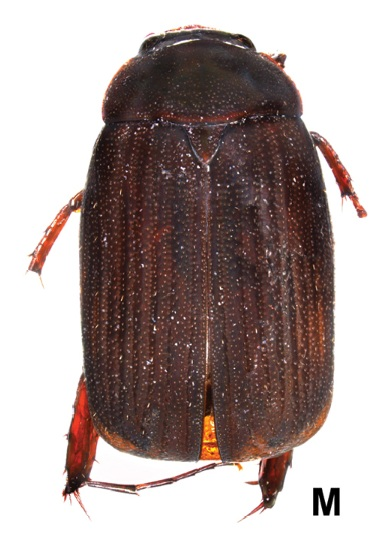

Scientific classification
- Kingdom: Animalia
- Phylum: Arthropoda
- Class: Insecta
- Order: Coleoptera
- Suborder: Polyphaga
- Infraorder: Scarabaeiformia
- Family: Scarabaeidae
- Genus: Maladera
- Species: M. mizoramensis

Binomial name
- Maladera mizoramensis Sreedevi, Speer, Fabrizi & Ahrens, 2018

= Maladera mizoramensis =

Species of beetle

Maladera mizoramensis is a species of beetle of the family Scarabaeidae. It is found in India (Maharashtra, Mizoram).

== Description ==
Adults reach a length of about 8.9 mm. They have an oblong-oval body. The dorsal surface is dark brown and the ventral surface is dark reddish brown. They are mostly dull (but the head is moderately shiny) and nearly glabrous, except for some single setae on the dorsal surface of the head.

== Etymology ==
The species name is derived from its occurrence in Mizoram state of India.
