= Maladera parabrunnescens =

Scientific classification
- Kingdom: Animalia
- Phylum: Arthropoda
- Class: Insecta
- Order: Coleoptera
- Suborder: Polyphaga
- Infraorder: Scarabaeiformia
- Family: Scarabaeidae
- Genus: Maladera
- Species: M. parabrunnescens

Binomial name
- Maladera parabrunnescens Ahrens, Fabrizi & Liu, 2021

Species of beetle

Maladera parabrunnescens is a species of beetle of the family Scarabaeidae. It is found in China (Zhejiang).

== Description ==
Adults reach a length of about 10.2 mm. They have a reddish brown, oblong body. The antennae are yellow and the dorsal surface is shiny and almost glabrous.

== Etymology ==
The species name is derived from Greek para (meaning close to) and the species name brunnescens and refers to the strong similarity to Maladera brunnescens.
