= Maladera brunnescens =

Scientific classification
- Kingdom: Animalia
- Phylum: Arthropoda
- Class: Insecta
- Order: Coleoptera
- Suborder: Polyphaga
- Infraorder: Scarabaeiformia
- Family: Scarabaeidae
- Genus: Maladera
- Species: M. brunnescens

Binomial name
- Maladera brunnescens (Frey, 1972)

Synonyms
- Serica brunnescens Frey, 1972

Species of beetle

Maladera brunnescens is a species of beetle of the family Scarabaeidae. It is found in China (Fujian, Guangdong).

== Description ==
Adults reach a length of about 10.1 mm. They have a reddish brown, oblong body. The antennae are yellow and the dorsal surface is shiny and (except for the head) almost glabrous.
