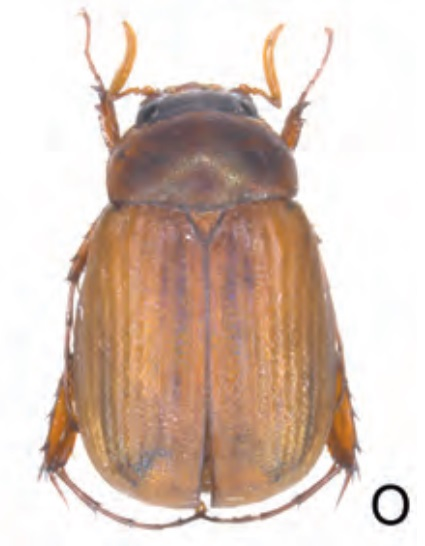

Scientific classification
- Kingdom: Animalia
- Phylum: Arthropoda
- Class: Insecta
- Order: Coleoptera
- Suborder: Polyphaga
- Infraorder: Scarabaeiformia
- Family: Scarabaeidae
- Genus: Maladera
- Species: M. clavata

Binomial name
- Maladera clavata (Frey, 1972)

Synonyms
- Autoserica clavata Frey, 1972

= Maladera clavata =

Species of beetle

Maladera clavata is a species of beetle of the family Scarabaeidae. It is found in India (Karnataka, Kerala, Tamil Nadu).

== Description ==
Adults reach a length of about 5.6 mm. They have a yellowish brown, oblong-oval body. The head and pronotum are reddish brown, while the antennae are yellow. The surface is mostly dull and nearly glabrous, except for some setae on the head.
