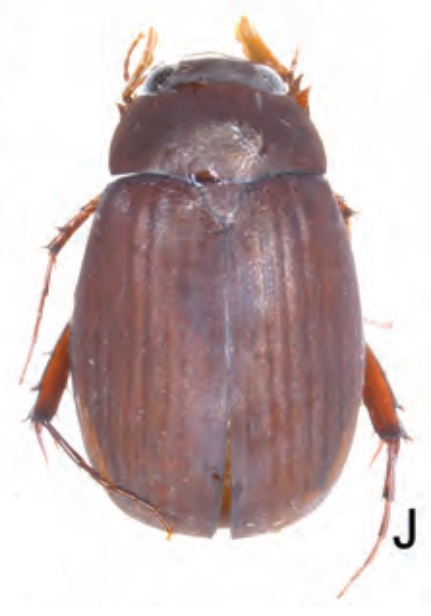

Scientific classification
- Kingdom: Animalia
- Phylum: Arthropoda
- Class: Insecta
- Order: Coleoptera
- Suborder: Polyphaga
- Infraorder: Scarabaeiformia
- Family: Scarabaeidae
- Genus: Maladera
- Species: M. sempiternella

Binomial name
- Maladera sempiternella Ahrens & Fabrizi, 2016

= Maladera sempiternella =

Species of beetle

Maladera sempiternella is a species of beetle of the family Scarabaeidae. It is found in northern Myanmar.

== Description ==
Adults reach a length of about 8.8 mm. They have a dark reddish brown, dull, oval body. Except for some setae on the head, the dorsal surface is nearly glabrous.
