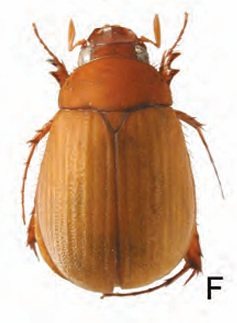

Scientific classification
- Kingdom: Animalia
- Phylum: Arthropoda
- Class: Insecta
- Order: Coleoptera
- Suborder: Polyphaga
- Infraorder: Scarabaeiformia
- Family: Scarabaeidae
- Genus: Maladera
- Species: M. cardoni

Binomial name
- Maladera cardoni (Brenske, 1896)

Synonyms
- Serica cardoni Brenske, 1896; Autoserica carinata Khan & Ghai, 1980; Cephaloserica bhutanensis Frey, 1975; Serica (Autoserica) nuristanica Petrovitz, 1965; Serica tsienluana Brenske, 1898

= Maladera cardoni =

Species of beetle

Maladera cardoni is a species of beetle of the family Scarabaeidae. It is found in Iran, Afghanistan, Pakistan, Bhutan, China (Xizang), India (Himachal Pradesh, Sikkim, Uttarakhand, Assam, Chhattisgarh, Punjab, Rajasthan, Tamil Nadu, West Bengal) and Nepal.

== Description ==
Adults reach a length of about 5.7–8 mm. They have a yellowish-brown, oblong-oval body, while the head and pronotum are light reddish brown. The upper surface is mostly dull and glabrous, except for some setae on the head and the lateral cilia of the pronotum and elytra.
