= Maladera sinistra =

Scientific classification
- Kingdom: Animalia
- Phylum: Arthropoda
- Class: Insecta
- Order: Coleoptera
- Suborder: Polyphaga
- Infraorder: Scarabaeiformia
- Family: Scarabaeidae
- Genus: Maladera
- Species: M. sinistra

Binomial name
- Maladera sinistra (Brenske, 1899)

Synonyms
- Autoserica sinistra Brenske, 1899

Species of beetle

Maladera sinistra is a species of beetle of the family Scarabaeidae. It is found in Thailand.

== Description ==
Adults reach a length of about 7–8 mm. They are dark brown, very slightly dull, and the punctation is clearly visible everywhere. The clypeus is broad, tapering slightly anteriorly with rounded corners and a weakly curved anterior margin. Behind it are some coarser punctures with weak setae. The rest is widely punctate with a faint area of punctation in the middle. The suture is very fine, the frons finely punctate. The pronotum is almost straight at the sides. The ridge next to it is quite distinct and more visible here because the pronotum is shiny. The marginal setae are weak, the surface is fairly densely and finely punctate with tiny hairs. The anterior margin is slightly projecting in the middle, the posterior corners are slightly rounded. The scutellum is short. The elytra are narrow, barely raised and striated. The first interval is slightly wider and more punctate than the others, which are narrower than the punctate striae and unpunctate. In these, the punctures are arranged in a row, next to which are rather irregular punctures with minute hairs. The pygidium is shiny, pointed and widely punctate.
