= Maladera loi =

Scientific classification
- Kingdom: Animalia
- Phylum: Arthropoda
- Clade: Pancrustacea
- Class: Insecta
- Order: Coleoptera
- Suborder: Polyphaga
- Infraorder: Scarabaeiformia
- Family: Scarabaeidae
- Genus: Maladera
- Species: M. loi

Binomial name
- Maladera loi (Kobayashi, 1991)

Synonyms
- Amiserica loi Kobayashi, 1991

Species of beetle

Maladera loi is a species of beetle of the family Scarabaeidae. It is found in Taiwan.

== Description ==
Adults reach a length of about 8 mm. Adults are very similar to Eumaladera gravida.
