= Maladera gravida =

Scientific classification
- Kingdom: Animalia
- Phylum: Arthropoda
- Class: Insecta
- Order: Coleoptera
- Suborder: Polyphaga
- Infraorder: Scarabaeiformia
- Family: Scarabaeidae
- Genus: Maladera
- Species: M. gravida

Binomial name
- Maladera gravida Ahrens, 2006

Synonyms
- Amiserica nitididorsis Kobayashi, 1991 (preocc.)

Species of beetle

Maladera gravida is a species of beetle of the family Scarabaeidae. It is found in Taiwan.

== Description ==
Adults reach a length of about 7.5–8.6 mm. Adults are elongate oval, reddish brown to dark reddish brown or blackish brown above and beneath. The antennal club is yellowish brown to reddish brown.
