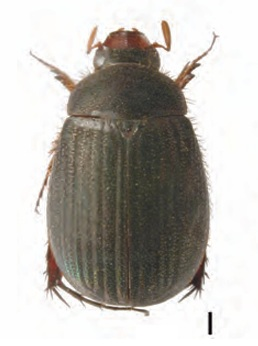

Scientific classification
- Kingdom: Animalia
- Phylum: Arthropoda
- Class: Insecta
- Order: Coleoptera
- Suborder: Polyphaga
- Infraorder: Scarabaeiformia
- Family: Scarabaeidae
- Genus: Maladera
- Species: M. iridescens

Binomial name
- Maladera iridescens (Blanchard, 1850)

Synonyms
- Omaloplia iridescens Blanchard, 1850; Autoserica forsteri Frey, 1965; Serica globus Burmeister, 1855

= Maladera iridescens =

Species of beetle

Maladera iridescens is a species of beetle of the family Scarabaeidae. It is found in India (Arunachal Pradesh, Jammu & Kashmir, Uttarakhand, Andhra Pradesh, Chhattisgarh, Haryana, Karnataka, Kerala, Maharashtra, Odisha, Punjab, West Bengal), Nepal and Pakistan.

== Description ==
Adults reach a length of about 9.2 mm. They have a black, broadly oval body. The upper surface is mostly dull and glabrous, except for some setae on the head and the lateral cilia of the pronotum and elytra.
