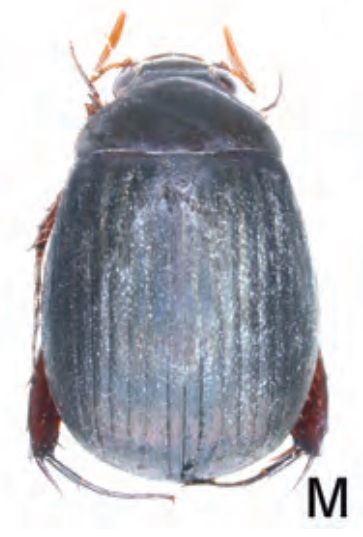

Scientific classification
- Kingdom: Animalia
- Phylum: Arthropoda
- Class: Insecta
- Order: Coleoptera
- Suborder: Polyphaga
- Infraorder: Scarabaeiformia
- Family: Scarabaeidae
- Genus: Maladera
- Species: M. profana

Binomial name
- Maladera profana Ahrens & Fabrizi, 2016

= Maladera profana =

Species of beetle

Maladera profana is a species of beetle of the family Scarabaeidae. It is found in India (Meghalaya, Mizoram, Nagaland).

== Description ==
Adults reach a length of about 10.6–12.2 mm. They have a black, wide, oval body. The dorsal surface is dull and glabrous.

== Etymology ==
The species name is derived from Latin profanus (meaning non sacred).
