= Maladera ventralis =

Scientific classification
- Kingdom: Animalia
- Phylum: Arthropoda
- Class: Insecta
- Order: Coleoptera
- Suborder: Polyphaga
- Infraorder: Scarabaeiformia
- Family: Scarabaeidae
- Genus: Maladera
- Species: M. ventralis

Binomial name
- Maladera ventralis (Brenske, 1898)

Synonyms
- Autoserica ventralis Brenske, 1898

Species of beetle

Maladera ventralis is a species of beetle of the family Scarabaeidae. It is found in China (Jiangxi).

== Description ==
Adults reach a length of about 9 mm. They are brown underneath and blackish-brown above. They are dull with a faint opalescent sheen. The clypeus is broad, weakly margined, with shallow punctures, the intervals without wrinkles, only on each side behind the anterior margin with an indistinct seta, without elevation. The frons is widely punctured. The pronotum is straight anteriorly, distinctly widened posteriorly in an almost straight line along the sides, the posterior angles slightly rounded, the marginal setae weak, the punctures scarcely denser than those of the frons, with minute, laterally more distinct hairs. The scutellum is relatively large and elongate. The elytra are very densely and irregularly punctured in the striae, the intervals narrow, slightly raised, almost without punctures. In each puncture is a minute hair, yet the scattered setae are barely perceptible. The pygidium is slightly rounded and somewhat convex towards the apex.
