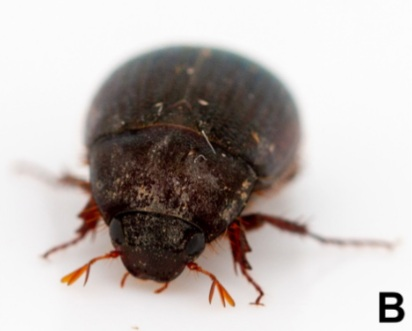

Scientific classification
- Kingdom: Animalia
- Phylum: Arthropoda
- Clade: Pancrustacea
- Class: Insecta
- Order: Coleoptera
- Suborder: Polyphaga
- Infraorder: Scarabaeiformia
- Family: Scarabaeidae
- Genus: Maladera
- Species: M. breviatella

Binomial name
- Maladera breviatella Fabrizi & Ahrens, 2014

= Maladera breviatella =

Species of beetle

Maladera breviatella is a species of beetle of the family Scarabaeidae. It is found in India and Sri Lanka.

== Description ==
Adults reach a length of about 8.3-8.6 mm. They have an oval body. The body is either dark brown or has an iridescent or dull greenish tinge. The antennae are yellow. The dorsal surface is dull and glabrous, except for a few small setae on the head and the lateral margins of the pronotum and elytra.

== Etymology ==
The name breviatella is based on the diminutive Latin form of breviata.
