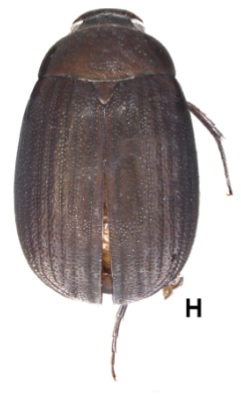

Scientific classification
- Kingdom: Animalia
- Phylum: Arthropoda
- Class: Insecta
- Order: Coleoptera
- Suborder: Polyphaga
- Infraorder: Scarabaeiformia
- Family: Scarabaeidae
- Genus: Maladera
- Species: M. viraktamathi

Binomial name
- Maladera viraktamathi Sreedevi, Ranasinghe, Fabrizi & Ahrens, 2019

= Maladera viraktamathi =

Species of beetle

Maladera viraktamathi is a species of beetle of the family Scarabaeidae. It is found in India (Mizoram).

== Description ==
Adults reach a length of about 9 mm. They have an uniformly dark brown, oval body. The dorsal and ventral surface are dull, while the head and anterior part of the pronotum are moderately shiny. The dorsal surface, except for the lateral setae of the elytra and pronotum, is nearly glabrous.

== Etymology ==
The species is dedicated to the Indian leafhopper taxonomist and entomologist, Prof. Chandrasekhara A. Viraktamath.
