= Maladera himalayica =

Scientific classification
- Kingdom: Animalia
- Phylum: Arthropoda
- Class: Insecta
- Order: Coleoptera
- Suborder: Polyphaga
- Infraorder: Scarabaeiformia
- Family: Scarabaeidae
- Genus: Maladera
- Species: M. himalayica

Binomial name
- Maladera himalayica (Brenske, 1896)

Synonyms
- Autoserica himalayica Brenske, 1896; Autoserica franklinmuelleri Moser, 1925; Autoserica spatiosa Brenske, 1899

Species of beetle

Maladera himalayica is a species of beetle of the family Scarabaeidae. It is found in India (Sikkim, West Bengal), Bhutan and Nepal.

== Description ==
Adults reach a length of about 8.3–12.4 mm. They have a reddish-brown, oval body. The upper surface is mostly dull and glabrous, except for a few setae on the head and the lateral cilia of the pronotum and elytra.

== Subspecies ==
- Maladera himalayica himalayica (India: Sikkim, West Bengal)
- Maladera himalayica immunda Ahrens, 2004 (Nepal)
- Maladera himalayica incola Ahrens, 2004 (Nepal)
- Maladera himalayica thakkholae Ahrens, 2004 (Nepal)
- Maladera himalayica thimphuensis Ahrens, 2004 (Bhutan)
