= Maladera sordida =

Scientific classification
- Kingdom: Animalia
- Phylum: Arthropoda
- Class: Insecta
- Order: Coleoptera
- Suborder: Polyphaga
- Infraorder: Scarabaeiformia
- Family: Scarabaeidae
- Genus: Maladera
- Species: M. sordida

Binomial name
- Maladera sordida (Brenske, 1899)

Synonyms
- Autoserica sordida Brenske, 1899

Species of beetle

Maladera sordida is a species of beetle of the family Scarabaeidae. It is found in Thailand.

== Description ==
Adults reach a length of about 7–9 mm. They are brown, dull, without a silky sheen, but faintly opalescent. The clypeus is broad, almost angular, the angles only slightly rounded, densely and rather coarsely punctate, and more or less wrinkled, with a few coarser punctures on the anterior margin, bearing very short setae. The suture is quite indistinct. The pronotum is somewhat shortened, strongly projecting anteriorly in the middle, gradually widening posteriorly, without strongly rounded sides, with weakly rounded hind angles. The marginal setae are short and the surface is fairly densely covered with strong punctures with minute hairs. The scutellum is rather broad and pointed. The elytra are broadly but flatly striated, with confused punctation in the rows, the intervals less dense, and with fine tiny hairs everywhere in the punctures. The marginal setae are short.
