= Maladera mutabilis =

Scientific classification
- Kingdom: Animalia
- Phylum: Arthropoda
- Class: Insecta
- Order: Coleoptera
- Suborder: Polyphaga
- Infraorder: Scarabaeiformia
- Family: Scarabaeidae
- Genus: Maladera
- Species: M. mutabilis

Binomial name
- Maladera mutabilis (Fabricius, 1775)

Synonyms
- Melolontha mutabilis Fabricius, 1775; Autoserica pygmaea Frey, 1972; Serica barwayana Brenske, 1896; Melolontha globosa Herbst, 1790

Species of beetle

Maladera mutabilis is a species of beetle of the family Scarabaeidae. It is found in Indonesia (Java) and India (Tamil Nadu).

== Description ==
Adults reach a length of about 5.6–6.4 mm. They have a reddish-brown, oval body. The upper surface is mostly dull and glabrous, except for some hairs on the head and elytra and the lateral cilia of the pronotum and elytra.

== Taxonomy ==
Some works incorrectly consider Olivier (1789) as the author of this species or even interpreted M. mutabilis (Olivier) as a homonym of M. mutabilis (Fabriciues). However, no syntypes of Olivier's M. mutabilis have been located and it is very likely that Melolontha mutabilis (Olivier, 1789) is a nomen nudum.
