= Maladera contracta =

Scientific classification
- Kingdom: Animalia
- Phylum: Arthropoda
- Class: Insecta
- Order: Coleoptera
- Suborder: Polyphaga
- Infraorder: Scarabaeiformia
- Family: Scarabaeidae
- Genus: Maladera
- Species: M. contracta

Binomial name
- Maladera contracta (Brenske, 1899)

Synonyms
- Autoserica contracta Brenske, 1899

Species of beetle

Maladera contracta is a species of beetle of the family Scarabaeidae. It is found in Thailand.

== Description ==
Adults reach a length of about 5-5.5 mm. They are dull and yellow or reddish-yellow. The clypeus is angular, with a weakly projecting center and corners, giving it a slightly tridentate appearance. It is densely and finely punctate, with coarser punctures on the anterior margin. The frons and pronotum are even more finely and very densely punctate, both are glossy, with only a narrow opaque stripe on the posterior margin of the pronotum. The pronotum is gradually rounded at the sides with broadly rounded posterior corners and distinct marginal setae. The elytra are very densely punctate in the striae, and in the first stria, next to the suture, the punctation is also noticeably deeper and coarser. The striae therefore appear distinct. The intermediate margins are equally narrow, not raised, and finely sparsely punctate. The pygidium is densely dotted.
