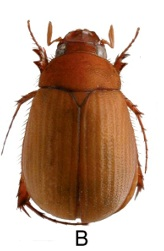

Scientific classification
- Kingdom: Animalia
- Phylum: Arthropoda
- Class: Insecta
- Order: Coleoptera
- Suborder: Polyphaga
- Infraorder: Scarabaeiformia
- Family: Scarabaeidae
- Genus: Maladera
- Species: M. rufocuprea

Binomial name
- Maladera rufocuprea (Blanchard, 1850)

Synonyms
- Omaloplia rufocuprea Blanchard, 1850; Serica carinirostris Brenske, 1896; Autoserica fatifera Brenske, 1898; Maladera truncatus Mittal, 1976

= Maladera rufocuprea =

Species of beetle

Maladera rufocuprea is a species of beetle of the family Scarabaeidae. It is found in Sri Lanka, India (Chhattisgarh, Haryana, Karnataka, Kerala, Madhya Pradesh, Maharashtra, Tamil Nadu, West Bengal, Himachal Pradesh, Uttarakhand) and Pakistan.

== Description ==
Adults reach a length of about 7.9 mm. They have a yellowish brown, oval body. The upper surface is mostly dull and glabrous, except for some setae on the head and the lateral cilia of the pronotum and elytra.
