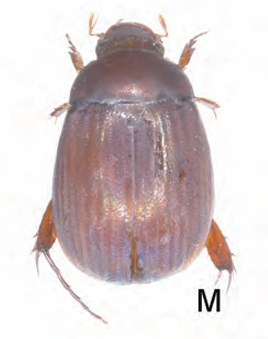

Scientific classification
- Kingdom: Animalia
- Phylum: Arthropoda
- Class: Insecta
- Order: Coleoptera
- Suborder: Polyphaga
- Infraorder: Scarabaeiformia
- Family: Scarabaeidae
- Genus: Maladera
- Species: M. rudimentalis

Binomial name
- Maladera rudimentalis Ahrens & Fabrizi, 2016

= Maladera rudimentalis =

Species of beetle

Maladera rudimentalis is a species of beetle of the family Scarabaeidae. It is found in India (Tamil Nadu).

== Description ==
Adults reach a length of about 7.6–9.9 mm. They have an oval body. The dorsal and ventral surface are dark reddish brown, while the antennae are yellowish. They are dull, partly with an iridescent shine. The dorsal surface is nearly glabrous, except for some setae on the head.

== Etymology ==
The species name is derived from Latin rudimentalis (meaning rudimentary) and refers to the reduced dorsal process of the right paramere.
