= Maladera inimica =

Scientific classification
- Kingdom: Animalia
- Phylum: Arthropoda
- Class: Insecta
- Order: Coleoptera
- Suborder: Polyphaga
- Infraorder: Scarabaeiformia
- Family: Scarabaeidae
- Genus: Maladera
- Species: M. inimica

Binomial name
- Maladera inimica (Brenske, 1899)

Synonyms
- Autoserica inimica Brenske, 1899

Species of beetle

Maladera inimica is a species of beetle of the family Scarabaeidae. It is found in Indonesia (Sumatra).

== Description ==
Adults reach a length of about 9–10 mm. They are dull, brownish-red and faintly opalescent. The clypeus is broad, distinctly margined anteriorly with slightly rounded corners, and densely punctate with individual setae behind the anterior margin. The pronotum is scarcely rounded at the sides, but here, as on the sides of the elytra, it is covered with strong, long setae. The posterior angles of the pronotum are only very slightly rounded, the surface is rather finely punctate, with extremely minute hairs in the punctures. The scutellum is small and pointed. The elytra are rather broadly but not very densely punctate in the striae, the intervals are narrow, slightly raised, smooth, with extremely minute hairs in the punctures. The pygidium is pointed, densely but extremely finely punctate, smooth and shiny.
