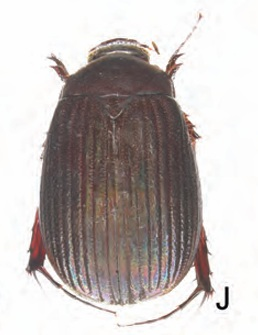

Scientific classification
- Kingdom: Animalia
- Phylum: Arthropoda
- Class: Insecta
- Order: Coleoptera
- Suborder: Polyphaga
- Infraorder: Scarabaeiformia
- Family: Scarabaeidae
- Genus: Maladera
- Species: M. clypeata

Binomial name
- Maladera clypeata (Fairmaire, 1887)

Synonyms
- Serica clypeata Fairmaire, 1887; Autoserica clypeata; Autoserica colossica Brenske, 1899; Autoserica spectabilis Brenske, 1899

= Maladera clypeata =

Species of beetle

Maladera clypeata is a species of beetle of the family Scarabaeidae. It is found in China (Guizhou, Sichuan, Yunnan), India (Assam, Manipur, Meghalaya, Mizoram), Laos, Myanmar, Thailand and Vietnam.

== Description ==
Adults reach a length of about 11.8–12.7 mm. They have an oval, reddish to dark brown body. The dorsal surface is dull.
