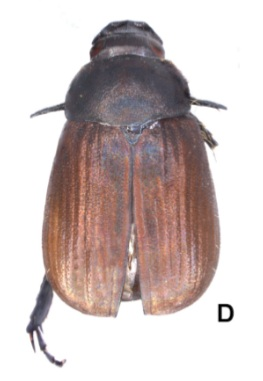

Scientific classification
- Kingdom: Animalia
- Phylum: Arthropoda
- Class: Insecta
- Order: Coleoptera
- Suborder: Polyphaga
- Infraorder: Scarabaeiformia
- Family: Scarabaeidae
- Genus: Maladera
- Species: M. naveeni

Binomial name
- Maladera naveeni Sreedevi, Ranasinghe, Fabrizi & Ahrens, 2019

= Maladera naveeni =

Species of beetle

Maladera naveeni is a species of beetle of the family Scarabaeidae. It is found in India (Karnataka).

== Description ==
Adults reach a length of about 7.2 mm. They have a dark reddish brown, oblong-oval body. The elytra are reddish brown and the antennae are yellowish. The dorsal surface is dull, while the labroclypeus is shiny. They are glabrous, except for a few short setae on the sides of the elytra.

== Etymology ==
The species is dedicated to the collector of the species, R. Naveen.
