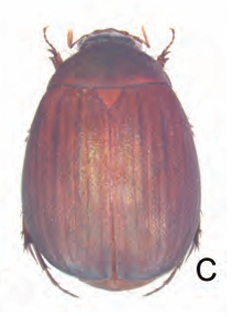

Scientific classification
- Kingdom: Animalia
- Phylum: Arthropoda
- Class: Insecta
- Order: Coleoptera
- Suborder: Polyphaga
- Infraorder: Scarabaeiformia
- Family: Scarabaeidae
- Genus: Maladera
- Species: M. dimidiata

Binomial name
- Maladera dimidiata Ahrens & Fabrizi, 2016

= Maladera dimidiata =

Species of beetle

Maladera dimidiata is a species of beetle of the family Scarabaeidae. It is found in India (Kerala, Tamil Nadu).

== Description ==
Adults reach a length of about 9.7–10 mm. They have a reddish brown, oval body. The disc and margins of the pronotum are darker and have a weak greenish shine, while the abdomen is yellowish brown. The dorsal and ventral surface are dull and, except for the lateral setae of the elytra and pronotum, nearly glabrous.

== Etymology ==
The species name is derived from Latin dimidiatus (meaning separated in two pieces) and refers to the right paramere being divided into two lobes.
