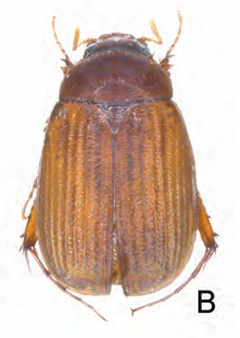

Scientific classification
- Kingdom: Animalia
- Phylum: Arthropoda
- Clade: Pancrustacea
- Class: Insecta
- Order: Coleoptera
- Suborder: Polyphaga
- Infraorder: Scarabaeiformia
- Family: Scarabaeidae
- Genus: Maladera
- Species: M. indica

Binomial name
- Maladera indica (Blanchard, 1850)

Synonyms
- Omaloplia indica Blanchard, 1850; Serica nilgirensis Sharp, 1903; Autoserica singularis Brenske, 1898; Serica laminipes Moser, 1915

= Maladera indica =

Species of beetle

Maladera indica is a species of beetle of the family Scarabaeidae. It is found in India (Kerala, Tamil Nadu).

== Description ==
Adults reach a length of about 7.2 mm. They have a yellowish brown, oblong-oval body. The head and pronotum are reddish brown, while the antennae are yellow. The dorsal surface is dull and nearly glabrous, except for some setae on the head.
