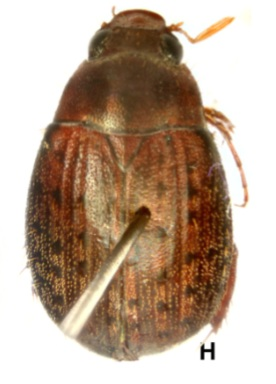

Scientific classification
- Kingdom: Animalia
- Phylum: Arthropoda
- Class: Insecta
- Order: Coleoptera
- Suborder: Polyphaga
- Infraorder: Scarabaeiformia
- Family: Scarabaeidae
- Genus: Maladera
- Species: M. hiyarensis

Binomial name
- Maladera hiyarensis Ranasinghe et al., 2022

= Maladera hiyarensis =

Species of beetle

Maladera hiyarensis is a species of beetle of the family Scarabaeidae. It is found in Sri Lanka.

== Description ==
Adults reach a length of about 6.8 mm. They have an oval, reddish brown body. The frons, disc of the pronotum and a few spots on the elytra are dark brown, while the antennae and legs are yellow. The dorsal surface has an iridescent shine, and is densely and shortly setose. There are numerous single erect setae on the elytra.

== Etymology ==
The species is named after its type locality 'Hiyare'.
