= Maladera insularis =

Scientific classification
- Kingdom: Animalia
- Phylum: Arthropoda
- Class: Insecta
- Order: Coleoptera
- Suborder: Polyphaga
- Infraorder: Scarabaeiformia
- Family: Scarabaeidae
- Genus: Maladera
- Species: M. insularis

Binomial name
- Maladera insularis (Brenske, 1899)

Synonyms
- Autoserica insularis Brenske, 1899

Species of beetle

Maladera insularis is a species of beetle of the family Scarabaeidae. It is found in India (the Andaman islands).

== Description ==
Adults reach a length of about 8 mm. They are brown and dull, without an opalescent sheen. The clypeus is broad, weakly tapered, densely wrinkled-punctate, with a bristle-like puncture in the anterior corners. The bristle-like puncture in the eye corners is also distinct. The pronotum is less transverse, scarcely projecting anteriorly in the middle, distinctly rounded at the sides, with strong setae here and anteriorly. The posterior corners are rounded. The scutellum is small. The elytra are punctate in rows within the striae, with closely spaced punctures beside them. Of the slightly raised intervals, only a very narrow line remains unpunctate, with a minute hair in each puncture. The marginal setae are dense and distinct. The pygidium is completely overshadowed by the elytra.
