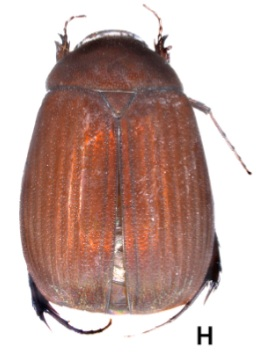

Scientific classification
- Kingdom: Animalia
- Phylum: Arthropoda
- Class: Insecta
- Order: Coleoptera
- Suborder: Polyphaga
- Infraorder: Scarabaeiformia
- Family: Scarabaeidae
- Genus: Maladera
- Species: M. sujitrae

Binomial name
- Maladera sujitrae Sreedevi, Ranasinghe, Fabrizi & Ahrens, 2019

= Maladera sujitrae =

Species of beetle

Maladera sujitrae is a species of beetle of the family Scarabaeidae. It is found in India (Kerala).

== Description ==
Adults reach a length of about 8.9 mm. They have an oval body. The dorsal and ventral surface are dark brown and the antennae are yellowish. The dorsal surface is dull, but the labroclypeus is shiny. They are nearly glabrous, except for some single setae on the dorsal surface of the head.

== Etymology ==
The species is dedicated to the collector of the species, M. Sujitra.
