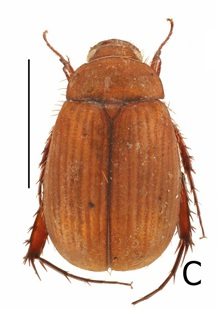

Scientific classification
- Kingdom: Animalia
- Phylum: Arthropoda
- Class: Insecta
- Order: Coleoptera
- Suborder: Polyphaga
- Infraorder: Scarabaeiformia
- Family: Scarabaeidae
- Genus: Maladera
- Species: M. aureola

Binomial name
- Maladera aureola (Murayama, 1938)

Synonyms
- Aserica aureola Murayama, 1938; Maladera juxianensis Ahrens, Fabrizi & Liu, 2021; Maladera liotibia Nomura, 1974

= Maladera aureola =

Species of beetle

Maladera aureola is a species of beetle of the family Scarabaeidae. It is found in China (Chongqing, Guangdong, Henan, Hubei, Hunan, Sichuan, Shandong), Japan, North Korea, South Korea and Taiwan.

== Description ==
Adults reach a length of about 6.7–9 mm. They have a yellowish brown, oblong-oval body. They are dull (although the labroclypeus is shiny) and have a few long setae on the head, pronotum and elytra.
