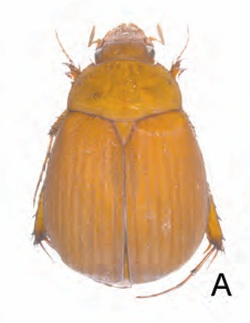

Scientific classification
- Kingdom: Animalia
- Phylum: Arthropoda
- Class: Insecta
- Order: Coleoptera
- Suborder: Polyphaga
- Infraorder: Scarabaeiformia
- Family: Scarabaeidae
- Genus: Maladera
- Species: M. decolor

Binomial name
- Maladera decolor Ahrens & Fabrizi, 2016

= Maladera decolor =

Species of beetle

Maladera decolor is a species of beetle of the family Scarabaeidae. It is found in India (Meghalaya).

== Description ==
Adults reach a length of about 9.6–10.2 mm. They have an oval body. They are generally yellowish brown, but are very variable in colour, ranging from entirely reddish brown, or reddish brown with dark brown elytra and sometimes with larger light spots on the elytra. The dorsal surface is dull and nearly glabrous, but with setae on the head.

== Etymology ==
The species name is derived from Latin decolor (meaning discoloured) and refers to its variable and polymorphic colour, which is sometimes lost.
