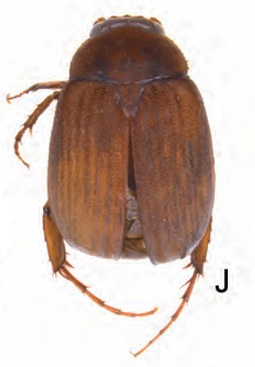

Scientific classification
- Kingdom: Animalia
- Phylum: Arthropoda
- Class: Insecta
- Order: Coleoptera
- Suborder: Polyphaga
- Infraorder: Scarabaeiformia
- Family: Scarabaeidae
- Genus: Maladera
- Species: M. hampsoni

Binomial name
- Maladera hampsoni Ahrens & Fabrizi, 2016

= Maladera hampsoni =

Species of beetle

Maladera hampsoni is a species of beetle of the family Scarabaeidae. It is found in India (the Nilgiri Hills in Tamil Nadu).

== Description ==
Adults reach a length of about 7.8 mm. They have an oblong-oval body. The dorsal surface is dark brown, the antennae are yellowish and the ventral surface is dark reddish brown. The dorsal surface is dull and nearly glabrous, except for some setae on the head.

== Etymology ==
The species is named after its collector, G.F. Hampson.
