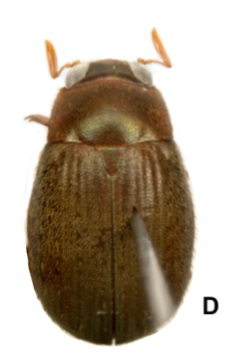

Scientific classification
- Kingdom: Animalia
- Phylum: Arthropoda
- Class: Insecta
- Order: Coleoptera
- Suborder: Polyphaga
- Infraorder: Scarabaeiformia
- Family: Scarabaeidae
- Genus: Maladera
- Species: M. karunaratnae

Binomial name
- Maladera karunaratnae Ranasinghe et al., 2022

= Maladera karunaratnae =

Species of beetle

Maladera karunaratnae is a species of beetle of the family Scarabaeidae. It is found in Sri Lanka.

== Description ==
Adults reach a length of about 5.6–6 mm (males) and 7 mm (females). They have an oval, brown body. The antennae, ventral side and legs are yellowish, the dorsal surface with an iridescent shine, densely shortly setose. The elytra have numerous single erect setae.

== Etymology ==
The species is named after Prof. Inoka Karunaratne (University of Peradeniya), in gratitude for her support for the project that led to the discovery of the species.
