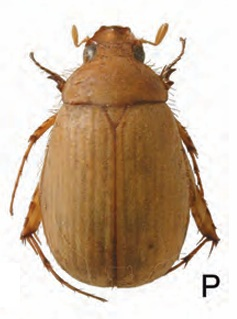

Scientific classification
- Kingdom: Animalia
- Phylum: Arthropoda
- Class: Insecta
- Order: Coleoptera
- Suborder: Polyphaga
- Infraorder: Scarabaeiformia
- Family: Scarabaeidae
- Genus: Maladera
- Species: M. thomsoni

Binomial name
- Maladera thomsoni (Brenske, 1894)

Synonyms
- Autoserica thomsoni Brenske, 1894; Cephaloserica phthisica Brenske, 1902; Autoserica assamensis Brenske, 1899

= Maladera thomsoni =

Species of beetle

Maladera thomsoni is a species of beetle of the family Scarabaeidae. It is found in India (Himachal Pradesh, Jammu & Kashmir, Uttarakhand, Assam, Haryana), Nepal and Pakistan.

== Description ==
Adults reach a length of about 7.7–8.3 mm. They have a yellow to light brown, oblong-oval body. The upper surface is mostly dull and densely covered with hairs on some areas.
