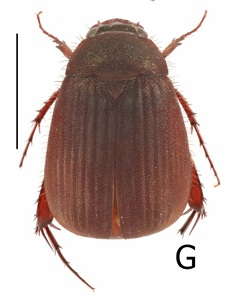

Scientific classification
- Kingdom: Animalia
- Phylum: Arthropoda
- Class: Insecta
- Order: Coleoptera
- Suborder: Polyphaga
- Infraorder: Scarabaeiformia
- Family: Scarabaeidae
- Genus: Maladera
- Species: M. stridula

Binomial name
- Maladera stridula (Brenske, 1898)

Synonyms
- Autoserica stridula Brenske, 1898

= Maladera stridula =

Species of beetle

Maladera stridula is a species of beetle of the family Scarabaeidae. It is found in China (Beijing, Guangdong, Guangxi, Hainan, Hebei, Hong Kong, Hubei, Shandong, Yunnan, Zhejiang), Taiwan, Myanmar, Thailand and Vietnam.

== Description ==
Adults reach a length of about 10.5 mm. They have a reddish to dark reddish brown, oval body. The antennae are brown. The labroclypeus is shiny, but the remainder of the dorsal surface is dull, with a few short setae on the head and elytra.
