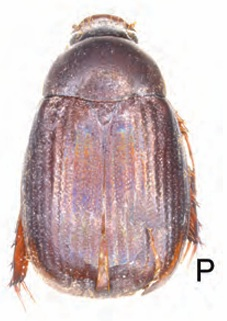

Scientific classification
- Kingdom: Animalia
- Phylum: Arthropoda
- Class: Insecta
- Order: Coleoptera
- Suborder: Polyphaga
- Infraorder: Scarabaeiformia
- Family: Scarabaeidae
- Genus: Maladera
- Species: M. submucronata

Binomial name
- Maladera submucronata Ahrens & Fabrizi, 2016

= Maladera submucronata =

Species of beetle

Maladera submucronata is a species of beetle of the family Scarabaeidae. It is found in India (Bihar, Tamil Nadu).

== Description ==
Adults reach a length of about 7.5–8.2 millimetres (0.30–0.32 in). They have a dark brown, oblong-oval body with yellowish antennae. They are mostly dull and the dorsal surface is nearly glabrous, except for some setae on the head.

== Etymology ==
The species name is derived from Latin sub- (meaning almost) and mucronatus (meaning sharp or pointed) and refers to the triangular shape of the apex of the right paramere.
