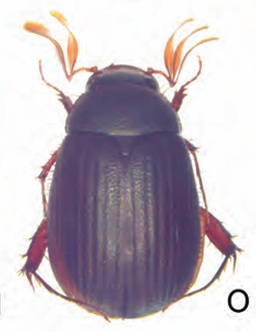

Scientific classification
- Kingdom: Animalia
- Phylum: Arthropoda
- Class: Insecta
- Order: Coleoptera
- Suborder: Polyphaga
- Infraorder: Scarabaeiformia
- Family: Scarabaeidae
- Genus: Maladera
- Species: M. geniculata

Binomial name
- Maladera geniculata Ahrens & Fabrizi, 2016

= Maladera geniculata =

Species of beetle

Maladera geniculata is a species of beetle of the family Scarabaeidae. It is found in Meghalaya, India.

== Description ==
Adults reach a length of about 8–10.2 mm. They have a dark brown, oval body. The dorsal and ventral surface are dull, while the head and anterior pronotum are moderately shiny. They are nearly glabrous, except for the lateral setae of the elytra and pronotum.

== Etymology ==
The species name is derived from Latin geniculatus (meaning having a knot) and refers to the short and transverse antennomeres of the antennal funiculus.
