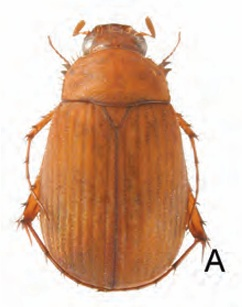

Scientific classification
- Kingdom: Animalia
- Phylum: Arthropoda
- Class: Insecta
- Order: Coleoptera
- Suborder: Polyphaga
- Infraorder: Scarabaeiformia
- Family: Scarabaeidae
- Genus: Maladera
- Species: M. modestula

Binomial name
- Maladera modestula (Brenske, 1902)

Synonyms
- Serica modesta Brenske, 1896 (preocc.); Autoserica modestula Brenske, 1902

= Maladera modestula =

Species of beetle

Maladera modestula is a species of beetle of the family Scarabaeidae. It is found in China (Fujian, Guangdong, Guangxi, Yunnan), India (Darjeeling, Sikkim, Meghalaya), Nepal, Taiwan, Laos, northern Myanmar, Thailand and Vietnam.

== Description ==
Adults reach a length of about 7.6–8.6 mm. They have a light reddish-brown, oblong-oval body. The upper surface is mostly dull and sparsely covered with erect hairs.
