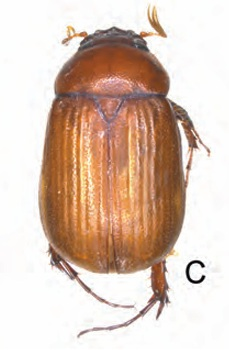

Scientific classification
- Kingdom: Animalia
- Phylum: Arthropoda
- Class: Insecta
- Order: Coleoptera
- Suborder: Polyphaga
- Infraorder: Scarabaeiformia
- Family: Scarabaeidae
- Genus: Maladera
- Species: M. bangaloreensis

Binomial name
- Maladera bangaloreensis Ahrens & Fabrizi, 2016

= Maladera bangaloreensis =

Species of beetle

Maladera bangaloreensis is a species of beetle of the family Scarabaeidae. It is found in India (Karnataka, Tamil Nadu) and Sri Lanka.

== Description ==
Adults reach a length of about 7.6–8.2 mm. They have a reddish brown, oblong-oval body, with the elytra slightly lighter and the antennae yellowish. The dorsal surface has some iridescent shine and is glabrous, except for a few short setae on sides of the elytra.

== Etymology ==
The species name refers to its type locality, Bangalore.
