= Maladera hiekei =

Scientific classification
- Kingdom: Animalia
- Phylum: Arthropoda
- Class: Insecta
- Order: Coleoptera
- Suborder: Polyphaga
- Infraorder: Scarabaeiformia
- Family: Scarabaeidae
- Genus: Maladera
- Species: M. hiekei

Binomial name
- Maladera hiekei (Frey, 1972)

Synonyms
- Autoserica hiekei Frey, 1972; Maladera castanea koreana Kim & Kim, 2003; Serica verticalis Fairmaire, 1888; (nec Lansberge, 1886)

Species of beetle

Maladera hiekei is a species of beetle of the family Scarabaeidae. It is found in China (Anhui, Beijing, Fujian, Gansu, Guangdong, Guizhou, Hong Kong, Hebei, Hubei, Hunan, Nei Mongol, Ningxia, Shaanxi, Shanxi, Sichuan, Zhejiang), North Korea, Mongolia, the Russian Far East and South Korea.

== Description ==
Adults reach a length of about 7.9 mm. They have a reddish brown, oblong-oval body. The antennae are yellowish. The surface is dull (but the labroclypeus is shiny) and glabrous, except for a few short setae on sides of the elytra.
