= Maladera sinuosa =

Scientific classification
- Kingdom: Animalia
- Phylum: Arthropoda
- Class: Insecta
- Order: Coleoptera
- Suborder: Polyphaga
- Infraorder: Scarabaeiformia
- Family: Scarabaeidae
- Genus: Maladera
- Species: M. sinuosa

Binomial name
- Maladera sinuosa (Brenske, 1899)

Synonyms
- Autoserica sinuosa Brenske, 1899

Species of beetle

Maladera sinuosa is a species of beetle of the family Scarabaeidae. It is found in Myanmar and Thailand.

== Description ==
Adults reach a length of about 10.5–11 mm. They are brown (but blackish-brown-green above), dull and opalescent. The clypeus is almost angular, slightly rounded at the anterior angles, punctate and slightly wrinkled. The pronotum is slightly rounded at the sides, the posterior angles are obtuse and slightly rounded, the marginal setae are very strong, and the minute hairs are difficult to discern. The scutellum is broad and pointed. The elytra are punctate in deep rows, the intervals scattered, almost equally wide, with minute hairs. The pygidium is only slightly tapered, broadly rounded, densely punctate, occasionally slightly wrinkled, with a distinct midline.
