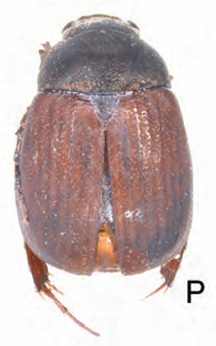

Scientific classification
- Kingdom: Animalia
- Phylum: Arthropoda
- Class: Insecta
- Order: Coleoptera
- Suborder: Polyphaga
- Infraorder: Scarabaeiformia
- Family: Scarabaeidae
- Genus: Maladera
- Species: M. tubulata

Binomial name
- Maladera tubulata Ahrens & Fabrizi, 2016

= Maladera tubulata =

Species of beetle

Maladera tubulata is a species of beetle of the family Scarabaeidae. It is found in India (Maharashtra).

== Description ==
Adults reach a length of about 6.1–6.4 mm. They have an oval body. The dorsal and ventral surface are blackish, the elytra dark brown, the antennae yellowish and the abdomen reddish. They are dull and the dorsal surface is nearly glabrous, except for some setae on the head.

== Etymology ==
The species name is derived from Latin tubulatus (meaning with a tube) and refers to the tubular shape of the phallobase of the aedeagus.
