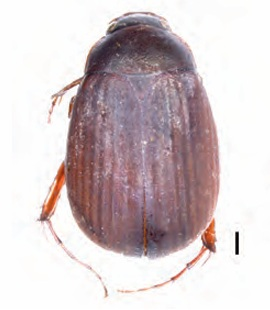

Scientific classification
- Kingdom: Animalia
- Phylum: Arthropoda
- Class: Insecta
- Order: Coleoptera
- Suborder: Polyphaga
- Infraorder: Scarabaeiformia
- Family: Scarabaeidae
- Genus: Maladera
- Species: M. neotridentipes

Binomial name
- Maladera neotridentipes Ahrens & Fabrizi, 2016

= Maladera neotridentipes =

Species of beetle

Maladera neotridentipes is a species of beetle of the family Scarabaeidae. It is found in India (Meghalaya).

== Description ==
Adults reach a length of about 10.3 mm. They have a dark reddish brown, oblong-oval body. They are dull and the dorsal surface is nearly glabrous, except for some setae on the head.

== Etymology ==
The species name is derived from Latin tri- (meaning three), dens (meaning tooth) and pes (meaning limp), as well as the Greek prefix neo- (meaning new).
