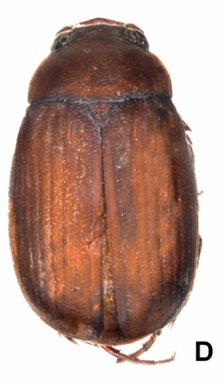

Scientific classification
- Kingdom: Animalia
- Phylum: Arthropoda
- Class: Insecta
- Order: Coleoptera
- Suborder: Polyphaga
- Infraorder: Scarabaeiformia
- Family: Scarabaeidae
- Genus: Neoserica
- Species: N. insubida

Binomial name
- Neoserica insubida (Brenske, 1899)

Synonyms
- Autoserica insubida Brenske, 1899; Maladera insubida; Serica immutabilis Fairmaire, 1893 (nec Gyllenhall, 1817)

= Neoserica insubida =

Species of beetle

Neoserica insubida is a species of beetle of the family Scarabaeidae. It is found in China (Guangdong, Hainan), Cambodia, Laos, Thailand and Vietnam.

== Description ==
Adults reach a length of about 8.5 mm. They have a reddish to dark brown, oblong-oval body. The antennae are yellowish and the dorsal surface is dull and glabrous.
