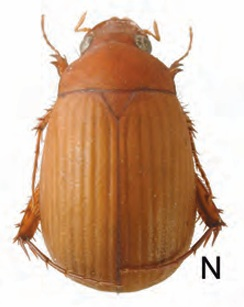

Scientific classification
- Kingdom: Animalia
- Phylum: Arthropoda
- Class: Insecta
- Order: Coleoptera
- Suborder: Polyphaga
- Infraorder: Scarabaeiformia
- Family: Scarabaeidae
- Genus: Maladera
- Species: M. sericella

Binomial name
- Maladera sericella (Brenske, 1899)

Synonyms
- Autoserica sericella Brenske, 1899

= Maladera sericella =

Species of beetle

Maladera sericella is a species of beetle of the family Scarabaeidae. It is found in India (Assam, Meghalaya, Mizoram, Arunachal Pradesh, Sikkim), Laos, Myanmar, Thailand, Bhutan, China (Yunnan) and Nepal.

== Description ==
Adults reach a length of about 7.6–8.1 mm. They have a reddish brown to yellowish brown, oval body. The upper surface is mostly dull and glabrous, except for some setae on the head and the lateral cilia of the pronotum and elytra.
