= Maladera eremita =

Scientific classification
- Kingdom: Animalia
- Phylum: Arthropoda
- Class: Insecta
- Order: Coleoptera
- Suborder: Polyphaga
- Infraorder: Scarabaeiformia
- Family: Scarabaeidae
- Genus: Maladera
- Species: M. eremita

Binomial name
- Maladera eremita (Brenske, 1899)

Synonyms
- Autoserica eremita Brenske, 1899

Species of beetle

Maladera eremita is a species of beetle of the family Scarabaeidae. It is found in the Philippines (Mindanao).

== Description ==
Adults reach a length of about 8 mm. They have a rounded oval, dull, brownish-red or blackish body. The clypeus is densely punctate, somewhat more wrinkled anteriorly, distinctly margined, slightly raised in the middle of the margin with short, rounded corners, and with a faint hump-like elevation in the middle of the surface. The frons and pronotum are widely punctate, the punctation being obscured by the tomentum. The hind corners of the pronotum are almost rectangular, and the marginal setae are weak and sparsely preserved. The striae of the elytra are clearly marked by rows of punctures, with the intervals all of equal width and widely punctate. The setae of the lateral margin are very short and inconspicuous.
