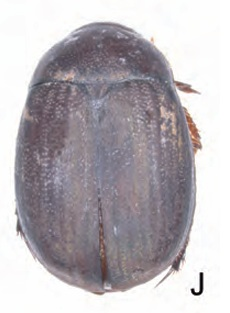

Scientific classification
- Kingdom: Animalia
- Phylum: Arthropoda
- Class: Insecta
- Order: Coleoptera
- Suborder: Polyphaga
- Infraorder: Scarabaeiformia
- Family: Scarabaeidae
- Genus: Maladera
- Species: M. praviforceps

Binomial name
- Maladera praviforceps Ahrens & Fabrizi, 2016

= Maladera praviforceps =

Species of beetle

Maladera praviforceps is a species of beetle of the family Scarabaeidae. It is found in India (Karnataka, Kerala).

== Description ==
Adults reach a length of about 8 mm. They have an oval body. The dorsal and ventral surface are dark brown and the antennae are yellowish. The dorsal surface is dull and nearly glabrous, except for some setae on the head.

== Etymology ==
The species name is derived from Latin pravus (meaning irregular) and forceps and refers to the shape of the parameres, which is dissimilar to those of related species.
