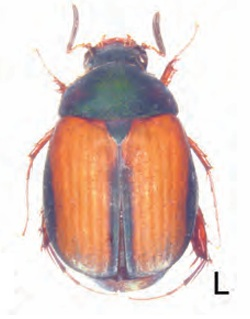

Scientific classification
- Kingdom: Animalia
- Phylum: Arthropoda
- Class: Insecta
- Order: Coleoptera
- Suborder: Polyphaga
- Infraorder: Scarabaeiformia
- Family: Scarabaeidae
- Genus: Maladera
- Species: M. versuta

Binomial name
- Maladera versuta Ahrens & Fabrizi, 2016

= Maladera versuta =

Species of beetle

Maladera versuta is a species of beetle of the family Scarabaeidae. It is found in India (Meghalaya).

== Description ==
Adults reach a length of about 5.6–6.1 mm. They have a reddish brown, oval body. The club of the antennae, pronotum, scutellum and margins of the elytra are all dark brown to black, the dark parts of the pronotum and head with a greenish shine. The dorsal surface is dull and nearly glabrous, except for some setae on the head.

== Etymology ==
The species name is derived from Latin versutus (meaning cunning).
