= Maladera andamana =

Scientific classification
- Kingdom: Animalia
- Phylum: Arthropoda
- Class: Insecta
- Order: Coleoptera
- Suborder: Polyphaga
- Infraorder: Scarabaeiformia
- Family: Scarabaeidae
- Genus: Maladera
- Species: M. andamana

Binomial name
- Maladera andamana (Brenske, 1899)

Synonyms
- Autoserica andamana Brenske, 1899

Species of beetle

Maladera andamana is a species of beetle of the family Scarabaeidae. It is found in India (the Andaman islands).

== Description ==
Adults reach a length of about 4.5 mm. They are dull, reddish-brown, with a darker head, and with a dark green spot on the anterior margin of the pronotum, as well as dark-edged elytra. They are silky-glossy underneath. The clypeus is metallic-glossy, not tapered, finely punctate with a slight elevation behind the anterior margin. The pronotum is strongly convex, not projecting anteriorly in the middle, barely curved at the sides with somewhat pointed posterior angles, finely punctate with minute hairs. The elytra are densely, coarsely, deeply punctate in the striae and the intervals are narrow, smooth and raised. They are minutely hairy with distinct setae between them.
