= Maladera ruficollis =

Scientific classification
- Kingdom: Animalia
- Phylum: Arthropoda
- Class: Insecta
- Order: Coleoptera
- Suborder: Polyphaga
- Infraorder: Scarabaeiformia
- Family: Scarabaeidae
- Genus: Maladera
- Species: M. ruficollis

Binomial name
- Maladera ruficollis (Brenske, 1899)

Synonyms
- Autoserica ruficollis Brenske, 1899

Species of beetle

Maladera ruficollis is a species of beetle of the family Scarabaeidae. It is found in Thailand.

== Description ==
Adults reach a length of about 7.3–7.5 mm. They are dull, faintly opalescent and reddish-brown, with the elytra blackish-blue-green. The clypeus is strongly punctate and the frons is very large and broad. The pronotum is rounded posteriorly at the sides, with obtuse posterior angles that are broadly rounded, the marginal setae are short. The surface is rather densely punctate, somewhat more sparsely in the middle, the punctures are distinct, not very fine. The scutellum is small, and the elytra are striated with raised striations, the intervals unpunctate and narrow, densely and rather coarsely punctate within the striations. The pygidium tapers towards the apex.
