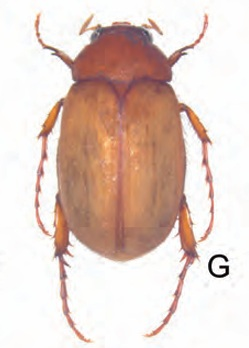

Scientific classification
- Kingdom: Animalia
- Phylum: Arthropoda
- Class: Insecta
- Order: Coleoptera
- Suborder: Polyphaga
- Infraorder: Scarabaeiformia
- Family: Scarabaeidae
- Genus: Maladera
- Species: M. lorenzi

Binomial name
- Maladera lorenzi Ahrens & Fabrizi, 2016

= Maladera lorenzi =

Species of beetle

Maladera lorenzi is a species of beetle of the family Scarabaeidae. It is found in India (Karnataka, Tamil Nadu).

== Description ==
Adults reach a length of about 5.9–6.5 mm. They have a yellowish brown, oval body. The antennae are yellow and the head is shiny, while the remainder of the dorsal surface is dull and almost glabrous, except for a few small setae on the head and elytra.

== Etymology ==
The species is named after one of its collectors, W. Lorenz.
