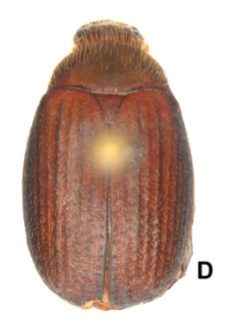

Scientific classification
- Kingdom: Animalia
- Phylum: Arthropoda
- Class: Insecta
- Order: Coleoptera
- Suborder: Polyphaga
- Infraorder: Scarabaeiformia
- Family: Scarabaeidae
- Genus: Maladera
- Species: M. galdaththana

Binomial name
- Maladera galdaththana Ranasinghe, Eberle, Benjamin & Ahrens, 2020

= Maladera galdaththana =

Species of beetle

Maladera galdaththana is a species of beetle of the family Scarabaeidae. It is found in Sri Lanka.

== Description ==
Adults reach a length of about 7.4–8.2 mm. They have a dark brown, oval body. The antennae are dark yellowish. The labroclypeus is moderately shiny and the dorsal surface is dull, with fine, sparse erect setae on the head, pronotum and elytra.

== Etymology ==
The name of the species refers to its type locality, Galdaththa.
