= Maladera laminifera =

Scientific classification
- Kingdom: Animalia
- Phylum: Arthropoda
- Clade: Pancrustacea
- Class: Insecta
- Order: Coleoptera
- Suborder: Polyphaga
- Infraorder: Scarabaeiformia
- Family: Scarabaeidae
- Genus: Maladera
- Species: M. laminifera

Binomial name
- Maladera laminifera (Moser, 1916)

Synonyms
- Autoserica laminifera Moser, 1916

Species of beetle

Maladera laminifera is a species of beetle of the family Scarabaeidae. It is found in Tanzania.

== Description ==
Adults reach a length of about 8 mm. They are brown and dull, slightly darker above. The frons is tomentose and finely punctate and the antennae are yellowish-brown. The pronotum is moderately densely punctate, the punctures with tiny setae, but some punctures, particularly next to the lateral margins, are covered with longer setae. The lateral margins are setate. The elytra are punctate in the striae, while the darker, very weakly convex intervals are almost devoid of punctures. The punctures have tiny setae and a few larger setae are arranged in rows. The base of the elytra is more densely covered with distinct setae, and such setae are also more numerous at the end of the elytra.
