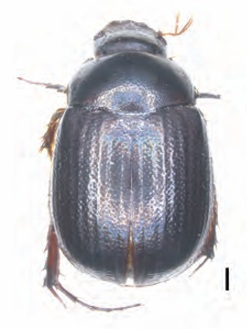

Scientific classification
- Kingdom: Animalia
- Phylum: Arthropoda
- Clade: Pancrustacea
- Class: Insecta
- Order: Coleoptera
- Suborder: Polyphaga
- Infraorder: Scarabaeiformia
- Family: Scarabaeidae
- Genus: Maladera
- Species: M. severini

Binomial name
- Maladera severini (Brenske, 1896)

Synonyms
- Serica severini Brenske, 1896

= Maladera severini =

Species of beetle

Maladera severini is a species of beetle of the family Scarabaeidae. It is found in India (Haryana, Jharkhand, Madhya Pradesh, Rajasthan).

== Description ==
Adults reach a length of about 6.6–8.4 mm. They have a blackish brown, short, oval body. The antennae are yellow and most of the dorsal surface has an iridescent shine and is glabrous, except for a few small setae on the head and the lateral margins of the pronotum and elytra.
