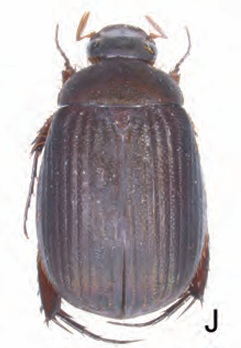

Scientific classification
- Kingdom: Animalia
- Phylum: Arthropoda
- Class: Insecta
- Order: Coleoptera
- Suborder: Polyphaga
- Infraorder: Scarabaeiformia
- Family: Scarabaeidae
- Genus: Maladera
- Species: M. johannesi

Binomial name
- Maladera johannesi Ahrens & Fabrizi, 2016

= Maladera johannesi =

Species of beetle

Maladera johannesi is a species of beetle of the family Scarabaeidae. It is found in India (Meghalaya) and China (Guangdong, Yunnan).

== Description ==
Adults reach a length of about 11.1–12 mm. They have a dark brown, oblong-oval body, with yellowish antennae. The dorsal surface is dull and nearly glabrous, except for a few short setae on sides of the elytra.

== Etymology ==
The species is named in honour of the curator Johannes Frisch (Berlin).
