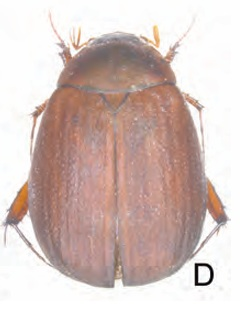

Scientific classification
- Kingdom: Animalia
- Phylum: Arthropoda
- Class: Insecta
- Order: Coleoptera
- Suborder: Polyphaga
- Infraorder: Scarabaeiformia
- Family: Scarabaeidae
- Genus: Maladera
- Species: M. kallarensis

Binomial name
- Maladera kallarensis Ahrens & Fabrizi, 2016

= Maladera kallarensis =

Species of beetle

Maladera kallarensis is a species of beetle of the family Scarabaeidae. It is found in India (Karnataka, Kerala).

== Description ==
Adults reach a length of about 9.4–10.9 mm. They have a reddish brown, oval body. The margins of the pronotum are darker with a weak greenish shine. The dorsal and ventral surface are dull and, except for the lateral setae of the elytra and pronotum, nearly glabrous.

== Etymology ==
The species name refers to its occurrence in the Kallar valley.
