= Maladera moebiusi =

Scientific classification
- Kingdom: Animalia
- Phylum: Arthropoda
- Class: Insecta
- Order: Coleoptera
- Suborder: Polyphaga
- Infraorder: Scarabaeiformia
- Family: Scarabaeidae
- Genus: Maladera
- Species: M. moebiusi

Binomial name
- Maladera moebiusi (Brenske, 1899)

Synonyms
- Autoserica moebiusi Brenske, 1899

Species of beetle

Maladera moebiusi is a species of beetle of the family Scarabaeidae. It is found in Indonesia (Sumatra).

== Description ==
Adults reach a length of about 12.6 mm. They are dull, very strongly tomentose, and with shiny legs. They are blackish-brown, but brown underneath. The clypeus is broad, tapering anteriorly, widely striate and weakly punctate. The frons is shiny behind the suture, sparsely but not widely punctate. The pronotum is distinctly projecting anteriorly in the middle, the sides are straight, widening evenly posteriorly, the hind angles are right-angled, not rounded. The elytra are punctate in rows, the intervals are flat, evenly widely punctate. The pygidium is slightly tapered and densely and coarsely punctate.
