= Maladera mulmeina =

Scientific classification
- Kingdom: Animalia
- Phylum: Arthropoda
- Class: Insecta
- Order: Coleoptera
- Suborder: Polyphaga
- Infraorder: Scarabaeiformia
- Family: Scarabaeidae
- Genus: Maladera
- Species: M. mulmeina

Binomial name
- Maladera mulmeina (Brenske, 1899)

Synonyms
- Autoserica mulmeina Brenske, 1899

Species of beetle

Maladera mulmeina is a species of beetle of the family Scarabaeidae. It is found in Myanmar.

== Description ==
Adults reach a length of about 5.5–6.5 mm. They are reddish-brown underneath, more or less darker above, slightly opaque and without an opalescent sheen. The clypeus is very densely, almost wrinkledly punctate and the suture is smooth. The frons is deeply but less densely punctate with a fine, smooth line at the suture. The pronotum is strongly convex, evenly rounded at the sides with broadly rounded posterior angles, very densely and finely punctate. The striae of the elytra are narrow, densely and irregularly punctate within them. The intervals are alternately somewhat less punctate. The marginal setae of the pronotum and elytra are dense and strong.
