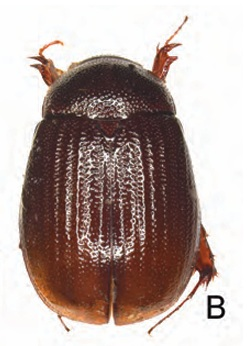

Scientific classification
- Kingdom: Animalia
- Phylum: Arthropoda
- Class: Insecta
- Order: Coleoptera
- Suborder: Polyphaga
- Infraorder: Scarabaeiformia
- Family: Scarabaeidae
- Genus: Maladera
- Species: M. punctulata

Binomial name
- Maladera punctulata (Frey, 1972)

Synonyms
- Autoserica punctulata Frey, 1972

= Maladera punctulata =

Species of beetle

Maladera punctulata is a species of beetle of the family Scarabaeidae. It is found in India (Assam, Meghalaya), Laos, Thailand, Vietnam and China (Guangxi, Yunnan).

== Description ==
Adults reach a length of about 5.2 mm. They have a dark reddish brown, oval body. The dorsal and ventral surface are shiny and, except for the lateral setae of the elytra and pronotum nearly glabrous.
