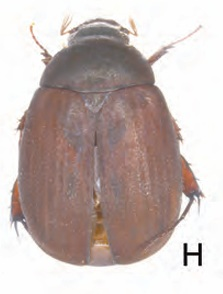

Scientific classification
- Kingdom: Animalia
- Phylum: Arthropoda
- Class: Insecta
- Order: Coleoptera
- Suborder: Polyphaga
- Infraorder: Scarabaeiformia
- Family: Scarabaeidae
- Genus: Maladera
- Species: M. mysoreensis

Binomial name
- Maladera mysoreensis Ahrens & Fabrizi, 2016

= Maladera mysoreensis =

Species of beetle

Maladera mysoreensis is a species of beetle of the family Scarabaeidae. It is found in India (Karnataka, Tamil Nadu).

== Description ==
Adults reach a length of about 8.1–9.8 mm. They have an oval body. The dorsal and ventral surface are dark brown, the elytra are reddish brown and the antennae are yellowish. The dorsal surface is dull (the pronotum with a greenish shine) and nearly glabrous, except for some setae on the head.

== Etymology ==
The species name refers to its occurrence in Mysore.
