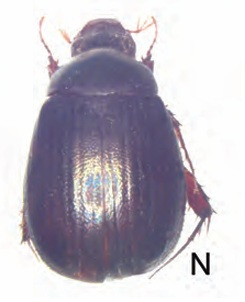

Scientific classification
- Kingdom: Animalia
- Phylum: Arthropoda
- Class: Insecta
- Order: Coleoptera
- Suborder: Polyphaga
- Infraorder: Scarabaeiformia
- Family: Scarabaeidae
- Genus: Maladera
- Species: M. fastuosa

Binomial name
- Maladera fastuosa Ahrens & Fabrizi, 2016

= Maladera fastuosa =

Species of beetle

Maladera fastuosa is a species of beetle of the family Scarabaeidae. It is found in India (Kerala).

== Description ==
Adults reach a length of about 9.6–9.8 mm. They have a dark brown, oblong-oval body with yellowish antennae. They are shiny and the dorsal surface is nearly glabrous, except for some setae on the head.

== Etymology ==
The species name is derived from Latin fastuosus (meaning haughty) and refers to the dark shiny body that is distinctive from most other Indian Sericini.
