= Maladera rudis =

Scientific classification
- Kingdom: Animalia
- Phylum: Arthropoda
- Class: Insecta
- Order: Coleoptera
- Suborder: Polyphaga
- Infraorder: Scarabaeiformia
- Family: Scarabaeidae
- Genus: Maladera
- Species: M. rudis

Binomial name
- Maladera rudis (Brenske, 1899)

Synonyms
- Autoserica rudis Brenske, 1899

Species of beetle

Maladera rudis is a species of beetle of the family Scarabaeidae. It is found in Indonesia (Sumbawa, Sulawesi).

== Description ==
Adults reach a length of about 8.5 mm. They are dull, dark brown and slightly opalescent. The clypeus is densely wrinkled and rough-punctate, broad and short and slightly indented anteriorly. The frons is very finely punctate. The pronotum is scarcely projecting at the anterior margin, the lateral margin rounded with slightly projecting posterior angles, the marginal setae distinct and dense and the punctation fine. The elytra are punctate in sharply defined rows, with the intervals slightly raised and sparsely punctate with numerous. The marginal setae are distinct. The pygidium is distinctly pointed and punctate.
