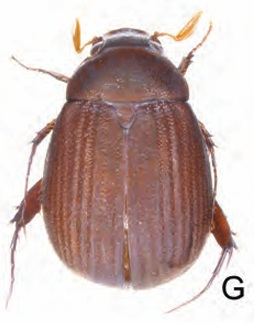

Scientific classification
- Kingdom: Animalia
- Phylum: Arthropoda
- Class: Insecta
- Order: Coleoptera
- Suborder: Polyphaga
- Infraorder: Scarabaeiformia
- Family: Scarabaeidae
- Genus: Maladera
- Species: M. songsakensis

Binomial name
- Maladera songsakensis Ahrens & Fabrizi, 2016

= Maladera songsakensis =

Species of beetle

Maladera songsakensis is a species of beetle of the family Scarabaeidae. It is found in Meghalaya, India.

== Description ==
Adults reach a length of about 7.5–8.3 mm. They have a dark reddish brown, oblong-oval body. The dorsal and ventral surface are mostly dull, the former, except for the lateral setae of the elytra and pronotum, nearly glabrous.

== Etymology ==
The species is named after its type locality, Songsak.
