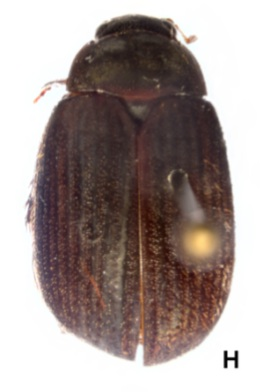

Scientific classification
- Kingdom: Animalia
- Phylum: Arthropoda
- Class: Insecta
- Order: Coleoptera
- Suborder: Polyphaga
- Infraorder: Scarabaeiformia
- Family: Scarabaeidae
- Genus: Maladera
- Species: M. deenstana

Binomial name
- Maladera deenstana Ranasinghe et al., 2022

= Maladera deenstana =

Species of beetle

Maladera deenstana is a species of beetle of the family Scarabaeidae. It is found in Sri Lanka.

== Description ==
Adults reach a length of about 8.2 mm. They have an oval, dark brown body. The antennae are yellow, and the dorsal surface is dull and densely minutely setose, the elytra with moderately dense, short setae.

== Etymology ==
The species is named after its type locality 'Deenston'.
