= Maladera saginata =

Scientific classification
- Kingdom: Animalia
- Phylum: Arthropoda
- Class: Insecta
- Order: Coleoptera
- Suborder: Polyphaga
- Infraorder: Scarabaeiformia
- Family: Scarabaeidae
- Genus: Maladera
- Species: M. saginata

Binomial name
- Maladera saginata (Brenske, 1899)

Synonyms
- Autoserica saginata Brenske, 1899

Species of beetle

Maladera saginata is a species of beetle of the family Scarabaeidae. It is found in Malaysia.

== Description ==
Adults reach a length of about 8.3 mm. They are short, rounded oval, dull, brown and opalescent. The clypeus is very broad, large, tapering, narrowly smooth behind the anterior margin, then strongly densely wrinkled-punctate. The frons is shiny behind the suture, strongly punctate, with a distinct setate puncture in the corner of the eye. The convex pronotum is short, scarcely projecting anteriorly in the middle, rounded at the sides with broadly rounded posterior angles. The elytra are irregularly densely punctate in the striae. The punctures arranged in rows are less conspicuous and of the same size as the others. The pygidium is tapered.
