= Maladera straba =

Scientific classification
- Kingdom: Animalia
- Phylum: Arthropoda
- Class: Insecta
- Order: Coleoptera
- Suborder: Polyphaga
- Infraorder: Scarabaeiformia
- Family: Scarabaeidae
- Genus: Maladera
- Species: M. straba

Binomial name
- Maladera straba (Brenske, 1898)

Synonyms
- Autoserica straba Brenske, 1898; Neoserica apogonoides Brenske, 1898; Neoserica sumatrensis Brenske, 1898; Neoserica pavieana Brenske, 1899; Autoserica stupida Brenske, 1900

Species of beetle

Maladera straba is a species of beetle of the family Scarabaeidae. It is found on the Malay Peninsula and on Sumatra. Reports from Sri Lanka are probably based on misidentifications and reports for Madagascar are probably based on a mistaken type location.

== Description ==
Adults reach a length of about 6.6–8.1 mm. They have an oval, reddish-brown to yellowish-brown body. The upper surface is strongly glossy and glabrous, except for a few individual hairs on the head, the lateral elytral intervals and the pubescence along the lateral margin of the pronotum.
