= Maladera guttula =

Scientific classification
- Kingdom: Animalia
- Phylum: Arthropoda
- Class: Insecta
- Order: Coleoptera
- Suborder: Polyphaga
- Infraorder: Scarabaeiformia
- Family: Scarabaeidae
- Genus: Maladera
- Species: M. guttula

Binomial name
- Maladera guttula (Sharp, 1876)

Synonyms
- Serica guttula Sharp, 1876

Species of beetle

Maladera guttula is a species of beetle of the family Scarabaeidae. It is found in Indonesia (Sumatra).

== Description ==
Adults reach a length of about 5.5–6 mm. They are reddish-brown and dull, without an opalescent sheen. The elytral apex has a rounded black spot. The clypeus is short, rather broad, the corners rounded, almost straight anteriorly, densely punctate with coarser setae in between. The pronotum is only slightly rounded laterally, with angular hind angles, finely punctate. The elytra are punctate almost in rows, rather coarsely, the intervals narrow, raised, almost devoid of punctures, the black spot at the apex nowhere reaches the margin and is furthest from the suture. The pygidium is broad and slightly rounded at the apex.
