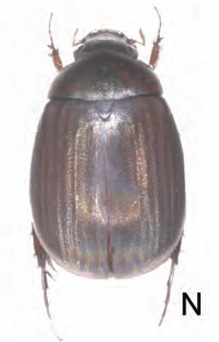

Scientific classification
- Kingdom: Animalia
- Phylum: Arthropoda
- Class: Insecta
- Order: Coleoptera
- Suborder: Polyphaga
- Infraorder: Scarabaeiformia
- Family: Scarabaeidae
- Genus: Maladera
- Species: M. theresae

Binomial name
- Maladera theresae Ahrens & Fabrizi, 2016

= Maladera theresae =

Species of beetle

Maladera theresae is a species of beetle of the family Scarabaeidae. It is found in India (Kerala).

== Description ==
Adults reach a length of about 8.8–9.8 mm. They have an oval body. The dorsal and ventral surface are dark brown and the antennae are yellowish. They are dull (partly with an iridescent shine) and the dorsal surface is nearly glabrous, except for some setae on the head.

== Etymology ==
The species is named after one of its collectors, Theresa Rajabai Selva Nathan.
