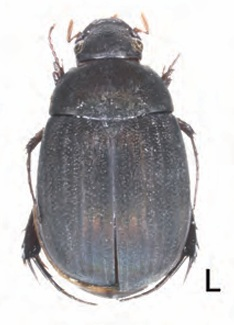

Scientific classification
- Kingdom: Animalia
- Phylum: Arthropoda
- Class: Insecta
- Order: Coleoptera
- Suborder: Polyphaga
- Infraorder: Scarabaeiformia
- Family: Scarabaeidae
- Genus: Maladera
- Species: M. proxima

Binomial name
- Maladera proxima (Burmeister, 1855)

Synonyms
- Serica proxima Burmeister, 1855

= Maladera proxima =

Species of beetle

Maladera proxima is a species of beetle of the family Scarabaeidae. It is found in India (Karnataka, Maharashta, West Bengal, Sikkim).

== Description ==
Adults reach a length of about 9.9 mm. They have an oval body. The dorsal surface is dark brown and the antennae are yellowish. The ventral surface is dark reddish brown. They are dull, the dorsal surface nearly glabrous, except for some setae on the head.
