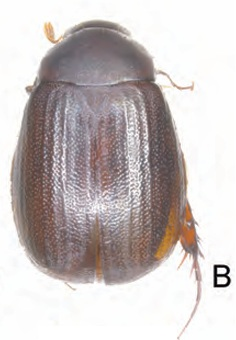

Scientific classification
- Kingdom: Animalia
- Phylum: Arthropoda
- Class: Insecta
- Order: Coleoptera
- Suborder: Polyphaga
- Infraorder: Scarabaeiformia
- Family: Scarabaeidae
- Genus: Maladera
- Species: M. keralensis

Binomial name
- Maladera keralensis (Frey, 1972)

Synonyms
- Autoserica keralensis Frey, 1972

= Maladera keralensis =

Species of beetle

Maladera keralensis is a species of beetle of the family Scarabaeidae. It is found in India (Goa, Karnataka, Kerala).

== Description ==
Adults reach a length of about 8 mm. They have a dark brown, oblong-oval body with yellowish antennae. They are mostly shiny, although only weakly in case of the pronotum. The dorsal surface is nearly glabrous, except for some setae on the head.
