= Maladera ukerewensis =

Scientific classification
- Kingdom: Animalia
- Phylum: Arthropoda
- Clade: Pancrustacea
- Class: Insecta
- Order: Coleoptera
- Suborder: Polyphaga
- Infraorder: Scarabaeiformia
- Family: Scarabaeidae
- Genus: Maladera
- Species: M. ukerewensis

Binomial name
- Maladera ukerewensis (Moser, 1917)

Synonyms
- Autoserica ukerewensis Moser, 1917

Species of beetle

Maladera ukerewensis is a species of beetle of the family Scarabaeidae. It is found in Tanzania.

== Description ==
Adults reach a length of about 9–10 mm. They are brown or blackish-brown above and brown below. The frons, due to the tomentum covering, shows only fine punctation and there are a few setae next to the eyes. The antennae are brown. The pronotum has fine punctation, and its margins are reddish. The lateral margins are setate. The elytra have rows of punctures, with the slightly convex intervals extensively covered with punctures. The alternating intervals are marked with rows of pale setae. Tiny but distinct setae are noticeable at the base of the elytra and on the scutellum.
