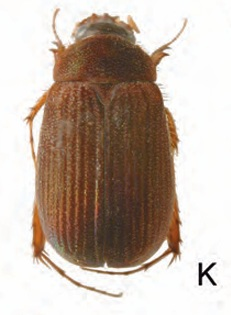

Scientific classification
- Kingdom: Animalia
- Phylum: Arthropoda
- Class: Insecta
- Order: Coleoptera
- Suborder: Polyphaga
- Infraorder: Scarabaeiformia
- Family: Scarabaeidae
- Genus: Maladera
- Species: M. dierli

Binomial name
- Maladera dierli (Frey, 1969)

Synonyms
- Cephaloserica dierli Frey, 1969

= Maladera dierli =

Species of beetle

Maladera dierli is a species of beetle of the family Scarabaeidae. It is found in India (Uttarakhand, Uttar Pradesh), Nepal and Pakistan.

== Description ==
Adults reach a length of about 7.7–8.1 mm. They have a dark brown, oval body. The upper surface is mostly dull and glabrous, except for a few setae on the head and the lateral cilia of the pronotum and elytra.
