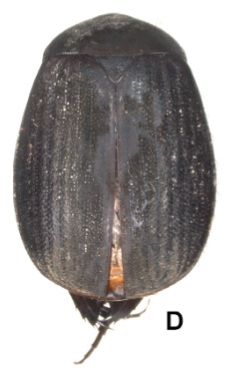

Scientific classification
- Kingdom: Animalia
- Phylum: Arthropoda
- Class: Insecta
- Order: Coleoptera
- Suborder: Polyphaga
- Infraorder: Scarabaeiformia
- Family: Scarabaeidae
- Genus: Maladera
- Species: M. murzini

Binomial name
- Maladera murzini Ahrens, 2004

= Maladera murzini =

Species of beetle

Maladera murzini is a species of beetle of the family Scarabaeidae. It is found in India (Assam, Meghalaya, Nagaland).

== Description ==
Adults reach a length of about 11.6–11.7 mm. They have a dark brown, oval body. The upper surface is mostly dull and glabrous, except for the lateral cilia of the pronotum and elytra.

== Etymology ==
The species is named for its collector, V. S. Murzin.
