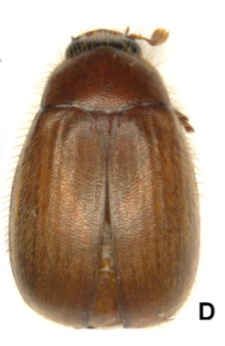

Scientific classification
- Kingdom: Animalia
- Phylum: Arthropoda
- Class: Insecta
- Order: Coleoptera
- Suborder: Polyphaga
- Infraorder: Scarabaeiformia
- Family: Scarabaeidae
- Genus: Maladera
- Species: M. dambullana

Binomial name
- Maladera dambullana Ranasinghe et al., 2022

= Maladera dambullana =

Species of beetle

Maladera dambullana is a species of beetle of the family Scarabaeidae. It is found in Sri Lanka.

== Description ==
Adults reach a length of about 5.6–6.7 mm (males) and 6–6.5 mm (females). They have a short oval, yellowish brown body. The antennae are yellow, and the dorsal surface is shiny and densely finely setose.

== Etymology ==
The species is named after its type locality 'Dambulla'.
