= Maladera nitidipes =

Scientific classification
- Kingdom: Animalia
- Phylum: Arthropoda
- Clade: Pancrustacea
- Class: Insecta
- Order: Coleoptera
- Suborder: Polyphaga
- Infraorder: Scarabaeiformia
- Family: Scarabaeidae
- Genus: Maladera
- Species: M. nitidipes

Binomial name
- Maladera nitidipes (Moser, 1915)

Synonyms
- Autoserica nitidipes Moser, 1915

Species of beetle

Maladera nitidipes is a species of beetle of the family Scarabaeidae. It is found in Indonesia (Sumbawa).

== Description ==
Adults reach a length of about 5.5 mm. They are black and dull, with shiny, dark brown legs. The head is sparsely setate and the frons is extensively and finely punctate. The antennae are brown. The pronotum is quite widely covered with punctures, the punctures with minute setae. The anterior margin and lateral margins also have setae. The elytra are slightly furrowed and punctate in rows within the furrows, while the intervals are unpunctate. Some spots have long, light-colored, protruding setae, while the remaining spots have extremely tiny setae.
