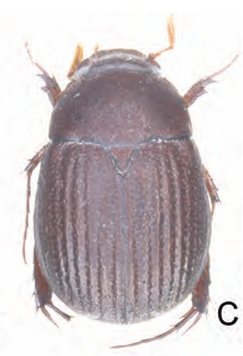

Scientific classification
- Kingdom: Animalia
- Phylum: Arthropoda
- Class: Insecta
- Order: Coleoptera
- Suborder: Polyphaga
- Infraorder: Scarabaeiformia
- Family: Scarabaeidae
- Genus: Maladera
- Species: M. rosettae

Binomial name
- Maladera rosettae (Frey, 1972)

Synonyms
- Autoserica rosettae Frey, 1972

= Maladera rosettae =

Species of beetle

Maladera rosettae is a species of beetle of the family Scarabaeidae. It is found in India (Karnataka, Madhya Pradesh, Rajasthan).

== Description ==
Adults reach a length of about 6.2 mm. They have a dark reddish brown, oval body. The dorsal surface is dull and nearly glabrous, except for the lateral setae of the elytra and pronotum.
