= Maladera signatitarsis =

Scientific classification
- Kingdom: Animalia
- Phylum: Arthropoda
- Class: Insecta
- Order: Coleoptera
- Suborder: Polyphaga
- Infraorder: Scarabaeiformia
- Family: Scarabaeidae
- Genus: Maladera
- Species: M. signatitarsis

Binomial name
- Maladera signatitarsis (Brenske, 1899)

Synonyms
- Autoserica signatitarsis Brenske, 1899

Species of beetle

Maladera signatitarsis is a species of beetle of the family Scarabaeidae. It is found in Myanmar.

== Description ==
Adults reach a length of about 10–11 mm. The pronotum is weakly rounded at the sides, the hind angles are almost angular, the surface is thick and finely punctate, with tiny hairs and with an extremely faint longitudinal line in front of the scutellum. The scutellum is broad and pointed. The elytra are punctate in rows, the striae at the elytra distinct, the intervals sparsely coarsely punctate, the first stria next to the suture somewhat wider, everywhere with tiny hairs in the spots. The pygidium is pointed, slightly rounded and clearly punctate.
