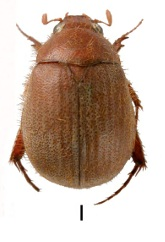

Scientific classification
- Kingdom: Animalia
- Phylum: Arthropoda
- Class: Insecta
- Order: Coleoptera
- Suborder: Polyphaga
- Infraorder: Scarabaeiformia
- Family: Scarabaeidae
- Genus: Maladera
- Species: M. setosa

Binomial name
- Maladera setosa (Brenske, 1896)

Synonyms
- Serica setosa Brenske, 1896; Autoserica cinerea Brenske, 1898

= Maladera setosa =

Species of beetle

Maladera setosa is a species of beetle of the family Scarabaeidae. It is found in Sri Lanka and on the whole Indian subcontinent, up to the foothills of the Himalayas and eastern Burma.

== Description ==
Adults reach a length of about 5.1–6.3 mm. They have a yellowish brown, oblong-oval body, with yellow antennae. The dorsal surface is shiny and the entire body is covered with dense, long hairs, between the surface of the elytra and pronotum, these are extremely dense and very fine.
