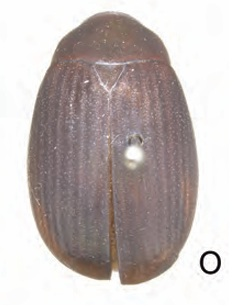

Scientific classification
- Kingdom: Animalia
- Phylum: Arthropoda
- Clade: Pancrustacea
- Class: Insecta
- Order: Coleoptera
- Suborder: Polyphaga
- Infraorder: Scarabaeiformia
- Family: Scarabaeidae
- Genus: Maladera
- Species: M. setosiventris

Binomial name
- Maladera setosiventris (Moser, 1916)

Synonyms
- Autoserica setosiventris Moser, 1916

= Maladera setosiventris =

Species of beetle

Maladera setosiventris is a species of beetle of the family Scarabaeidae. It is found in India (Kerala, Tamil Nadu).

== Description ==
Adults reach a length of about 9.4 mm. They have a dark brown, oblong-oval body with yellowish antennae. They are mostly dull and the dorsal surface is nearly glabrous, except for some setae on the head and elytra.
