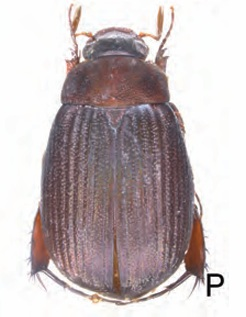

Scientific classification
- Kingdom: Animalia
- Phylum: Arthropoda
- Class: Insecta
- Order: Coleoptera
- Suborder: Polyphaga
- Infraorder: Scarabaeiformia
- Family: Scarabaeidae
- Genus: Maladera
- Species: M. shiva

Binomial name
- Maladera shiva Ahrens & Fabrizi, 2016

= Maladera shiva =

Species of beetle

Maladera shiva is a species of beetle of the family Scarabaeidae. It is found in India (Meghalaya, Mizoram).

== Description ==
Adults reach a length of about 11.25 mm. They have a dark brown, oblong-oval body, with yellowish antennae. The dorsal surface is mostly dull and glabrous, except for a few short setae on the sides of the elytra.

== Etymology ==
The species name refers to the deity of Hinduism, Shiva.
