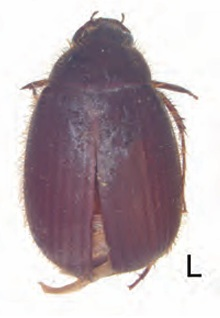

Scientific classification
- Kingdom: Animalia
- Phylum: Arthropoda
- Class: Insecta
- Order: Coleoptera
- Suborder: Polyphaga
- Infraorder: Scarabaeiformia
- Family: Scarabaeidae
- Genus: Maladera
- Species: M. densipilosa

Binomial name
- Maladera densipilosa Ahrens & Fabrizi, 2016

= Maladera densipilosa =

Species of beetle

Maladera densipilosa is a species of beetle of the family Scarabaeidae. It is found in India (Tamil Nadu).

== Description ==
Adults reach a length of about 9.6–10.2 mm. They have a dark brown, oblong-oval body with yellowish antennae. They are dull and there are dense, long, erect setae on the dorsal surface.

== Etymology ==
The species name is derived from Latin densus (meaning crowded or dense) and pilosus (meaning hairy).
