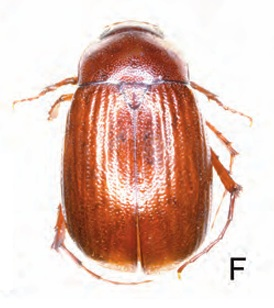

Scientific classification
- Kingdom: Animalia
- Phylum: Arthropoda
- Class: Insecta
- Order: Coleoptera
- Suborder: Polyphaga
- Infraorder: Scarabaeiformia
- Family: Scarabaeidae
- Genus: Maladera
- Species: M. andrewesi

Binomial name
- Maladera andrewesi Ahrens & Fabrizi, 2016

= Maladera andrewesi =

Species of beetle

Maladera andrewesi is a species of beetle of the family Scarabaeidae. It is found in India (Tamil Nadu).

== Description ==
Adults reach a length of about 9.8–10.6 mm. They have a reddish brown, strongly shiny, oblong-oval body. The antennae are yellowish and the dorsal surface is glabrous.

== Etymology ==
The species is named after one of its collectors, Henry L. Andrewes.
