= Maladera rufodorsata =

Scientific classification
- Kingdom: Animalia
- Phylum: Arthropoda
- Class: Insecta
- Order: Coleoptera
- Suborder: Polyphaga
- Infraorder: Scarabaeiformia
- Family: Scarabaeidae
- Genus: Maladera
- Species: M. rufodorsata

Binomial name
- Maladera rufodorsata (Fairmaire, 1888)

Synonyms
- Homaloplia rufodorsata Fairmaire, 1888; Autoserica rufodorsata

Species of beetle

Maladera rufodorsata is a species of beetle of the family Scarabaeidae. It is found in China (Fujian, Jiangxi, Yunnan), Laos, Myanmar and Thailand.

== Description ==
Adults reach a length of about 5.2 mm. They have a short, oval body. They are bicoloured, with the ventral side, head, anterior pronotum, scutellum and margins of the elytra black, and the legs, antennae, elytra and basal part of the pronotum yellowish brown. The dark parts sometimes have a greenish shine. The dorsal surface (except for the head, tibiae, and tarsi) is dull and nearly glabrous.
