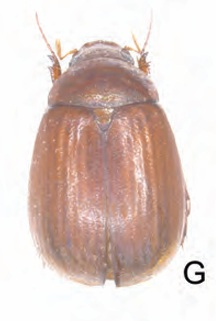

Scientific classification
- Kingdom: Animalia
- Phylum: Arthropoda
- Class: Insecta
- Order: Coleoptera
- Suborder: Polyphaga
- Infraorder: Scarabaeiformia
- Family: Scarabaeidae
- Genus: Maladera
- Species: M. initialis

Binomial name
- Maladera initialis Ahrens & Fabrizi, 2016

= Maladera initialis =

Species of beetle

Maladera initialis is a species of beetle of the family Scarabaeidae. It is found in India (Kerala).

== Description ==
Adults reach a length of about 8.1 mm. They have an oval body. The dorsal and ventral surface are reddish brown and the antennae are yellowish. The dorsal surface is dull (partly with an iridescent shine) and nearly glabrous, except for some setae on the head.

== Etymology ==
The species name is derived from Latin initialis (meaning initial or the first).
