= Maladera fulgida =

Scientific classification
- Kingdom: Animalia
- Phylum: Arthropoda
- Class: Insecta
- Order: Coleoptera
- Suborder: Polyphaga
- Infraorder: Scarabaeiformia
- Family: Scarabaeidae
- Genus: Maladera
- Species: M. fulgida

Binomial name
- Maladera fulgida (Brenske, 1899)

Synonyms
- Autoserica fulgida Brenske, 1899

Species of beetle

Maladera fulgida is a species of beetle of the family Scarabaeidae. It is found in India (the Andaman islands).

== Description ==
Adults reach a length of about 8 mm. The clypeus is broad but not tapered, strongly margined, rounded at the sides, with a slight transverse elevation behind the anterior margin, and sparse setae behind it. The frons is finely punctate. The pronotum is strongly convex, not projecting anteriorly in the middle, the sides slightly rounded anteriorly, straight posteriorly with pointed hind angles. The elytra are densely, irregularly punctate in the striae, with minute hairs and distinct setae arranged in rows between them. The pygidium is not covered by the elytra.
