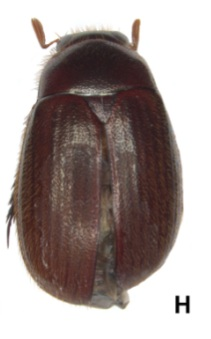

Scientific classification
- Kingdom: Animalia
- Phylum: Arthropoda
- Class: Insecta
- Order: Coleoptera
- Suborder: Polyphaga
- Infraorder: Scarabaeiformia
- Family: Scarabaeidae
- Genus: Maladera
- Species: M. kishi

Binomial name
- Maladera kishi Ranasinghe et al., 2022

= Maladera kishi =

Species of beetle

Maladera kishi is a species of beetle of the family Scarabaeidae. It is found in Sri Lanka.

== Description ==
Adults reach a length of about 8.9–9.2 mm (males) and 9–9.3 mm (females). They have a short oval, dark brown body. The antennae are yellow and the dorsal surface is shiny and finely densely setose.

== Etymology ==
The species is named for the daughter of one of the authors, Kishi P.L. Benjamin.
