= Maladera spinifera =

Scientific classification
- Kingdom: Animalia
- Phylum: Arthropoda
- Class: Insecta
- Order: Coleoptera
- Suborder: Polyphaga
- Infraorder: Scarabaeiformia
- Family: Scarabaeidae
- Genus: Maladera
- Species: M. spinifera

Binomial name
- Maladera spinifera (Brenske, 1899)

Synonyms
- Autoserica spinifera Brenske, 1899

Species of beetle

Maladera spinifera is a species of beetle of the family Scarabaeidae. It is found in Thailand.

== Description ==
Adults reach a length of about 9-9.5 mm. The clypeus is weakly tridentate, tapering anteriorly, densely coarsely punctate with setae and a faint median line. The suture is distinct, with setae on the frons behind it. The pronotum is evenly rounded at the sides, the posterior angles are rather broadly rounded, the surface is dull and almost widely punctate, with strong brown setae on the lateral and anterior margins. The elytra are very densely tomentose, with scattered setae, irregularly punctate in the striae, the intervals are narrowly raised and almost devoid of setae.
