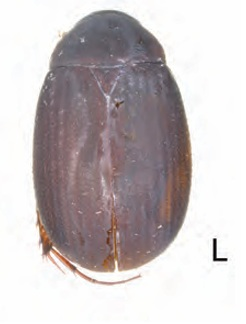

Scientific classification
- Kingdom: Animalia
- Phylum: Arthropoda
- Class: Insecta
- Order: Coleoptera
- Suborder: Polyphaga
- Infraorder: Scarabaeiformia
- Family: Scarabaeidae
- Genus: Maladera
- Species: M. poonmudi

Binomial name
- Maladera poonmudi (Frey, 1975)

Synonyms
- Autoserica poonmudi Frey, 1975

= Maladera poonmudi =

Species of beetle

Maladera poonmudi is a species of beetle of the family Scarabaeidae. It is found in India (Kerala, Tamil Nadu).

== Description ==
Adults reach a length of about 7.3 mm. They have a dark brown, oblong-oval body with yellowish antennae. They are mostly dull and the dorsal surface is nearly glabrous, except for some setae on the head.
