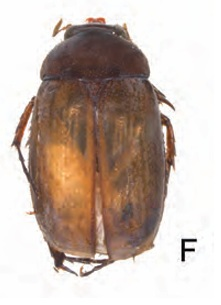

Scientific classification
- Kingdom: Animalia
- Phylum: Arthropoda
- Class: Insecta
- Order: Coleoptera
- Suborder: Polyphaga
- Infraorder: Scarabaeiformia
- Family: Scarabaeidae
- Genus: Maladera
- Species: M. ballariensis

Binomial name
- Maladera ballariensis Ahrens & Fabrizi, 2016

= Maladera ballariensis =

Species of beetle

Maladera ballariensis is a species of beetle of the family Scarabaeidae. It is found in India (Andhra Pradesh).

== Description ==
Adults reach a length of about 6.5–7.5 mm. They have a yellowish brown, oval body. The antennae are yellow and the head is shiny, while the remainder of the dorsal surface is dull and almost glabrous, except for a few small setae on the head and elytra.

== Etymology ==
The species name refers to its type locality, Ballari.
