= Maladera iliganica =

Scientific classification
- Kingdom: Animalia
- Phylum: Arthropoda
- Clade: Pancrustacea
- Class: Insecta
- Order: Coleoptera
- Suborder: Polyphaga
- Infraorder: Scarabaeiformia
- Family: Scarabaeidae
- Genus: Maladera
- Species: M. iliganica

Binomial name
- Maladera iliganica Moser, 1917

Synonyms
- Autoserica iliganica Moser, 1917

Species of beetle

Maladera iliganica is a species of beetle of the family Scarabaeidae. It is found in the Philippines (Mindanao).

== Description ==
Adults reach a length of about seven mm. They are dull, black above and somewhat olive-coloured brown below. The legs are shiny. The frons is sparsely punctate, with some erect setae next to the eyes. The antennae are reddish-yellow. The pronotum is rather sparsely punctate, the punctures with minute setae. The lateral margins are covered with erect setae. The elytra have rows of punctures, with the interstices only very weakly convex and sparsely punctate. All punctures have tiny setae, but some punctures have slightly larger setae.
