= Maladera sumbawana =

Scientific classification
- Kingdom: Animalia
- Phylum: Arthropoda
- Class: Insecta
- Order: Coleoptera
- Suborder: Polyphaga
- Infraorder: Scarabaeiformia
- Family: Scarabaeidae
- Genus: Maladera
- Species: M. sumbawana

Binomial name
- Maladera sumbawana (Brenske, 1899)

Synonyms
- Autoserica sumbawana Brenske, 1899

Species of beetle

Maladera sumbawana is a species of beetle of the family Scarabaeidae. It is found in Indonesia (Sumbawa).

== Description ==
Adults reach a length of about 5.5–6.5 mm. They are dull and brownish-red, with the back of the head and elytral apex black. The clypeus is broad and finely punctate with setae. The pronotum is not projecting anteriorly, rounded at the sides, with sharp hind angles. The elytra are densely irregularly punctate in the striae, the intervals narrow and unpunctate with scattered setae. The anterior half is brownish-red and the posterior half black. The pygidium is pointed, dull and very slightly wrinkled and punctate.
