= Maladera tridenticeps =

Scientific classification
- Kingdom: Animalia
- Phylum: Arthropoda
- Clade: Pancrustacea
- Class: Insecta
- Order: Coleoptera
- Suborder: Polyphaga
- Infraorder: Scarabaeiformia
- Family: Scarabaeidae
- Genus: Maladera
- Species: M. tridenticeps

Binomial name
- Maladera tridenticeps (Moser, 1915)

Synonyms
- Autoserica tridenticeps Moser, 1915

Species of beetle

Maladera tridenticeps is a species of beetle of the family Scarabaeidae. It is found in Myanmar.

== Description ==
Adults reach a length of about 13 mm. They are black, with a slight silky sheen. The frons is finely and rather sparsely punctate. The pronotum has a row of strong setae, and there are also some setae laterally behind the anterior margin. The surface is quite densely punctured. The elytra have narrow ridges, which are somewhat more sparsely punctured than the broader interstices, in which the punctures are arranged in irregular rows. The punctures have very tiny, light-coloured setae, but some punctures also have yellow setae.
