= Maladera fuscescens =

Scientific classification
- Kingdom: Animalia
- Phylum: Arthropoda
- Clade: Pancrustacea
- Class: Insecta
- Order: Coleoptera
- Suborder: Polyphaga
- Infraorder: Scarabaeiformia
- Family: Scarabaeidae
- Genus: Maladera
- Species: M. fuscescens

Binomial name
- Maladera fuscescens (Moser, 1917)

Synonyms
- Autoserica fuscescens Moser, 1917

Species of beetle

Maladera fuscescens is a species of beetle of the family Scarabaeidae. It is found in Tanzania.

== Description ==
Adults reach a length of about 8 mm. They are brown and dull. The blackish frons is dull and weakly punctate, with a few setae beside the eyes. The antennae are yellowish-brown. Both the lateral margins and the anterior margin of the pronotum have setae. The surface of the pronotum is densely punctate. The elytra have rows of punctures, with the intervals sparsely punctured. The alternating intervals are darker in colour and have a few pale setae. Fine setae are also present at the base of the elytra next to the scutellum.
