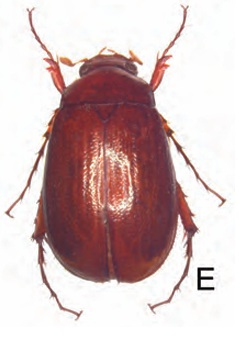

Scientific classification
- Kingdom: Animalia
- Phylum: Arthropoda
- Class: Insecta
- Order: Coleoptera
- Suborder: Polyphaga
- Infraorder: Scarabaeiformia
- Family: Scarabaeidae
- Genus: Maladera
- Species: M. malabarensis

Binomial name
- Maladera malabarensis Ahrens & Fabrizi, 2016

= Maladera malabarensis =

Species of beetle

Maladera malabarensis is a species of beetle of the family Scarabaeidae. It is found in India (Kerala).

== Description ==
Adults reach a length of about 10.2 mm. They have a reddish brown, strongly shiny, oblong-oval body with yellowish antennae. The dorsal surface is glabrous.

== Etymology ==
The species name refers to its type locality, Malabar.
