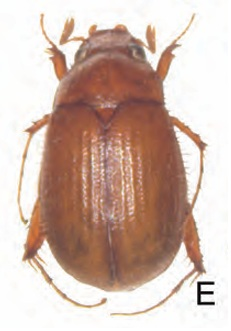

Scientific classification
- Kingdom: Animalia
- Phylum: Arthropoda
- Class: Insecta
- Order: Coleoptera
- Suborder: Polyphaga
- Infraorder: Scarabaeiformia
- Family: Scarabaeidae
- Genus: Maladera
- Species: M. senfti

Binomial name
- Maladera senfti Ahrens & Fabrizi, 2016

= Maladera senfti =

Species of beetle

Maladera senfti is a species of beetle of the family Scarabaeidae. It is found in India (Kerala).

== Description ==
Adults reach a length of about 5.2–5.7 mm. They have a yellowish brown, oblong-oval body, with yellow antennae. They are shiny, with dense and erect long setae on the head, pronotum and elytra.

== Etymology ==
The species is named after its collector, Mr. Senft.
