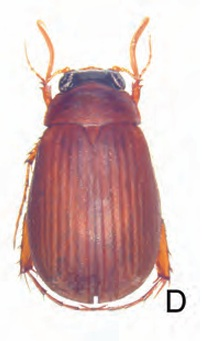

Scientific classification
- Kingdom: Animalia
- Phylum: Arthropoda
- Class: Insecta
- Order: Coleoptera
- Suborder: Polyphaga
- Infraorder: Scarabaeiformia
- Family: Scarabaeidae
- Genus: Maladera
- Species: M. sedula

Binomial name
- Maladera sedula Ahrens & Fabrizi, 2016

= Maladera sedula =

Species of beetle

Maladera sedula is a species of beetle of the family Scarabaeidae. It is found in India (Meghalaya, Mizoram).

== Description ==
Adults reach a length of about 7.1–7.7 mm. They have a reddish brown, dull, oblong-oval body. The dorsal surface is nearly glabrous, except for some setae on the head.

== Etymology ==
The species name is derived from Latin sedulus (meaning busy).
