= Maladera inaequabilis =

Scientific classification
- Kingdom: Animalia
- Phylum: Arthropoda
- Class: Insecta
- Order: Coleoptera
- Suborder: Polyphaga
- Infraorder: Scarabaeiformia
- Family: Scarabaeidae
- Genus: Maladera
- Species: M. inaequabilis

Binomial name
- Maladera inaequabilis (Brenske, 1899)

Synonyms
- Autoserica inaequabilis Brenske, 1899

Species of beetle

Maladera inaequabilis is a species of beetle of the family Scarabaeidae. It is found in Indonesia (Sumatra).

== Description ==
Adults reach a length of about 6.5 mm. They are brown and dull. They are very dark above with a greenish tinge. The clypeus is broad, scarcely tapered, densely finely wrinkled punctate, almost metallic-looking. The pronotum is not projecting in the middle of the anterior margin, the sides almost straight, finely punctate, with minute hairs. The scutellum is small. The elytra are punctate in rows and next to them densely irregularly, with minute hairs, the intervals only weakly demarcated.
