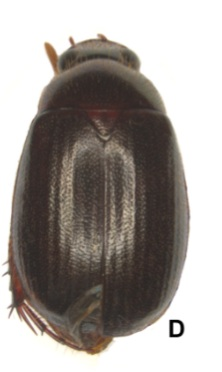

Scientific classification
- Kingdom: Animalia
- Phylum: Arthropoda
- Class: Insecta
- Order: Coleoptera
- Suborder: Polyphaga
- Infraorder: Scarabaeiformia
- Family: Scarabaeidae
- Genus: Maladera
- Species: M. haniel

Binomial name
- Maladera haniel Ranasinghe et al., 2022

= Maladera haniel =

Species of beetle

Maladera haniel is a species of beetle of the family Scarabaeidae. It is found in Sri Lanka.

== Description ==
Adults reach a length of about 8–8.2 mm. They have a short oval, dark brown body. The antennae are yellow and the dorsal surface is shiny, finely and densely setose.

== Etymology ==
The species is named for the son of one of the authors, Haniel P. Benjamin.
