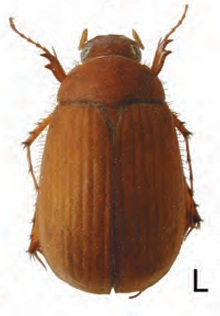

Scientific classification
- Kingdom: Animalia
- Phylum: Arthropoda
- Class: Insecta
- Order: Coleoptera
- Suborder: Polyphaga
- Infraorder: Scarabaeiformia
- Family: Scarabaeidae
- Genus: Maladera
- Species: M. joachimi

Binomial name
- Maladera joachimi Ahrens, 2004

= Maladera joachimi =

Species of beetle

Maladera joachimi is a species of beetle of the family Scarabaeidae. It is found in Nepal.

== Description ==
Adults reach a length of about 9.8–11.7 mm. They have a reddish-brown, oval body. The upper surface is mostly dull and glabrous, except for a few setae on the head and the lateral cilia of the pronotum and elytra.

== Etymology ==
The species is named for Joachim Schmidt, a friend and colleague of the author.
