= Maladera rubida =

Scientific classification
- Kingdom: Animalia
- Phylum: Arthropoda
- Clade: Pancrustacea
- Class: Insecta
- Order: Coleoptera
- Suborder: Polyphaga
- Infraorder: Scarabaeiformia
- Family: Scarabaeidae
- Genus: Maladera
- Species: M. rubida

Binomial name
- Maladera rubida (Moser, 1915)

Synonyms
- Autoserica rubida Moser, 1915; Autoserica errata Moser, 1916

Species of beetle

Maladera rubida is a species of beetle of the family Scarabaeidae. It is found in Myanmar.

== Description ==
Adults reach a length of about 8 mm. They are reddish-brown and dull. The frons shows only a few faint spots and the antennae are reddish-brown. The pronotum is moderately densely covered with minutely bristle-bearing punctures and the lateral margins also have setae. The elytra have rows of punctures, with the spaces between them only very weakly convex and finely punctured. The punctures have very small, pale setae, while isolated, somewhat larger setae are arranged in longitudinal rows.
