= Maladera fumosa =

Scientific classification
- Kingdom: Animalia
- Phylum: Arthropoda
- Class: Insecta
- Order: Coleoptera
- Suborder: Polyphaga
- Infraorder: Scarabaeiformia
- Family: Scarabaeidae
- Genus: Maladera
- Species: M. fumosa

Binomial name
- Maladera fumosa (Brenske, 1899)

Synonyms
- Autoserica fumosa Brenske, 1899; Autoserica perpendicularis Khan & Ghai, 1980; Autoserica tristicula Moser, 1915; Hyboserica globuliformis Peringuey, 1904; Serica pilula Sharp, 1903

Species of beetle

Maladera fumosa is a species of beetle of the family Scarabaeidae. It is found in Pakistan and India (Uttarakhand, Karnataka).

== Description ==
Adults reach a length of about 6.3–7 mm. They have a black, oval body, sometimes with some dark brown areas or with a dull greenish sheen. The upper surface is mostly dull and glabrous, except for the lateral cilia of the pronotum and elytra.
