= Maladera philippinensis =

Scientific classification
- Kingdom: Animalia
- Phylum: Arthropoda
- Class: Insecta
- Order: Coleoptera
- Suborder: Polyphaga
- Infraorder: Scarabaeiformia
- Family: Scarabaeidae
- Genus: Maladera
- Species: M. philippinensis

Binomial name
- Maladera philippinensis (Blanchard, 1850)

Synonyms
- Omaloplia philippinensis Blanchard, 1850; Autoserica philippinensis

Species of beetle

Maladera philippinensis is a species of beetle of the family Scarabaeidae. It is found in the Philippines.

== Description ==
Adults reach a length of about 12 mm. They have an elongate body. They are dark green above and dark brown below. The head is green, while the clypeus is wrinkled and punctate and reddish-brown, with the margin only slightly upturned. The antennae are reddish-brown. The pronotum is broad, green, almost glossy with some reddish-brown marginal setae. The elytra are greenish-brown, almost glossy, slightly ribbed with punctate intervals. The legs are reddish-brown.
