= Maladera sapitana =

Scientific classification
- Kingdom: Animalia
- Phylum: Arthropoda
- Clade: Pancrustacea
- Class: Insecta
- Order: Coleoptera
- Suborder: Polyphaga
- Infraorder: Scarabaeiformia
- Family: Scarabaeidae
- Genus: Maladera
- Species: M. sapitana

Binomial name
- Maladera sapitana (Moser, 1916)

Synonyms
- Autoserica sapitana Moser, 1916; Autoserica lombokiana Moser, 1915

Species of beetle

Maladera sapitana is a species of beetle of the family Scarabaeidae. It is found in Indonesia (Lombok).

== Description ==
Adults reach a length of about 11 mm. They are quite robust and dull, with the upper surface blackish-brown and the under surface reddish-brown. The frons is sparsely punctured and the antennae are yellowish-brown. The pronotum is moderately densely covered with fine punctures, and the lateral margins are setate. The elytra have regular rows of punctures, the spaces between these rather widely covered with faint punctures with extremely tiny setae.
