= Maladera futschauana =

Scientific classification
- Kingdom: Animalia
- Phylum: Arthropoda
- Class: Insecta
- Order: Coleoptera
- Suborder: Polyphaga
- Infraorder: Scarabaeiformia
- Family: Scarabaeidae
- Genus: Maladera
- Species: M. futschauana

Binomial name
- Maladera futschauana (Brenske, 1898)

Synonyms
- Autoserica futschauana Brenske, 1898; Autoserica montivaga Moser, 1915; Autoserica atavana Brenske, 1899

Species of beetle

Maladera futschauana is a species of beetle of the family Scarabaeidae. It is found in China (Anhui, Fujian, Guangdong, Guizhou, Guangxi, Sichuan, Yunnan), Cambodia, Laos, Myanmar, Thailand and Vietnam.

== Description ==
Adults reach a length of about 6.5 mm. They have a dark reddish brown to blackish, oval body. The antennae are yellow with a brown antennal club. The dorsal surface is dull and nearly glabrous, except for some single setae on the head.
