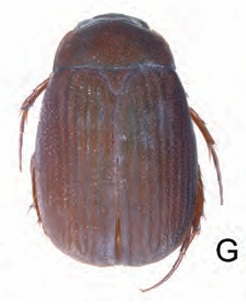

Scientific classification
- Kingdom: Animalia
- Phylum: Arthropoda
- Class: Insecta
- Order: Coleoptera
- Suborder: Polyphaga
- Infraorder: Scarabaeiformia
- Family: Scarabaeidae
- Genus: Maladera
- Species: M. sylhetensis

Binomial name
- Maladera sylhetensis Ahrens & Fabrizi, 2016

= Maladera sylhetensis =

Species of beetle

Maladera sylhetensis is a species of beetle of the family Scarabaeidae. It is found in Bangladesh.

== Description ==
Adults reach a length of about 9 mm. They have a dark brown, oblong-oval body. They are dull and the dorsal surface is nearly glabrous, except for some setae on the head.

== Etymology ==
The species name refers to the type locality, Sylhet.
