= Maladera spinosa =

Scientific classification
- Kingdom: Animalia
- Phylum: Arthropoda
- Class: Insecta
- Order: Coleoptera
- Suborder: Polyphaga
- Infraorder: Scarabaeiformia
- Family: Scarabaeidae
- Genus: Maladera
- Species: M. spinosa

Binomial name
- Maladera spinosa (Brenske, 1899)

Synonyms
- Autoserica spinosa Brenske, 1899

Species of beetle

Maladera spinosa is a species of beetle of the family Scarabaeidae. It is found in Indonesia (Java).

== Description ==
Adults reach a length of about 9 mm. They are oblong-oval, somewhat slender, golden-yellow with glossy legs, vividly opalescent, and distinguished by the numerous erect setae on the pronotum and elytra. The pronotum is slightly projecting at the anterior margin, the sides are barely rounded, with erect setae in the middle. The elytra are punctate in rows, with the intervals shallow, and with distinct setate punctures next to the suture and on the 2nd and 4th intervals along the row of punctures.
