= Maladera silviafabriziae =

Scientific classification
- Kingdom: Animalia
- Phylum: Arthropoda
- Class: Insecta
- Order: Coleoptera
- Suborder: Polyphaga
- Infraorder: Scarabaeiformia
- Family: Scarabaeidae
- Genus: Maladera
- Species: M. silviafabriziae

Binomial name
- Maladera silviafabriziae Chandra, Ahrens, Bhunia, Sreedevi & Gupta, 2021

Species of beetle

Maladera silviafabriziae is a species of beetle of the family Scarabaeidae. It is found on the Andaman and Nicobar Islands.

== Description ==
Adults reach a length of about 8.2 mm. They have an oblong-oval body. The dorsal surface is dark reddish-brown and the ventral surface is dark yellowish-brown. They are moderately shiny and, except some single setae on the head dorsal surface, nearly glabrous.

== Etymology ==
The species is dedicated to the Italian taxonomist, Silvia Fabrizi, in recognition of her contribution to Melolonthinae beetle taxonomy.
