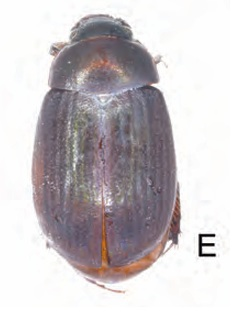

Scientific classification
- Kingdom: Animalia
- Phylum: Arthropoda
- Class: Insecta
- Order: Coleoptera
- Suborder: Polyphaga
- Infraorder: Scarabaeiformia
- Family: Scarabaeidae
- Genus: Maladera
- Species: M. placida

Binomial name
- Maladera placida (Frey, 1972)

Synonyms
- Autoserica placida Frey, 1972

= Maladera placida =

Species of beetle

Maladera placida is a species of beetle of the family Scarabaeidae. It is found in India (Tamil Nadu).

== Description ==
Adults reach a length of about 10.2 mm. They have a dark brown, oval body. The dorsal and ventral surface are dull and, except for the lateral setae of the elytra and pronotum, nearly glabrous.
