= Maladera lugubris =

Scientific classification
- Kingdom: Animalia
- Phylum: Arthropoda
- Class: Insecta
- Order: Coleoptera
- Suborder: Polyphaga
- Infraorder: Scarabaeiformia
- Family: Scarabaeidae
- Genus: Maladera
- Species: M. lugubris

Binomial name
- Maladera lugubris (Brenske, 1896)

Synonyms
- Autoserica lugubris Brenske, 1896

Species of beetle

Maladera lugubris is a species of beetle of the family Scarabaeidae. It is found in Bangladesh, Nepal, Pakistan and India (Himachal Pradesh, Uttarakhand, Assam, Chhattisgarh, Karnataka, Madhya Pradesh, Maharashtra, Uttar Pradesh, West Bengal).

== Description ==
Adults reach a length of about 7–8.4 mm. They have a black, oval body, sometimes with some dark brown areas or with a dull greenish sheen. The upper surface is mostly dull and glabrous, except for the lateral cilia of the pronotum and elytra.
