= Maladera assamica =

Scientific classification
- Kingdom: Animalia
- Phylum: Arthropoda
- Clade: Pancrustacea
- Class: Insecta
- Order: Coleoptera
- Suborder: Polyphaga
- Infraorder: Scarabaeiformia
- Family: Scarabaeidae
- Genus: Maladera
- Species: M. assamica

Binomial name
- Maladera assamica (Moser, 1915)

Synonyms
- Autoserica assamica Moser, 1915; Cephaloserica schereri Frey, 1962; Autoserica ornatipennis Moser, 1915

Species of beetle

Maladera assamica is a species of beetle of the family Scarabaeidae. It is found in India (Assam, Meghalaya).

== Description ==
Adults reach a length of about 6.6–7.3 mm. They have a black, short, oval body, with the antennae and sometimes the elytra partly yellowish-brown. Parts of the dark areas have a faint greenish or iridescent shine. The upper surface is dull and glabrous, except for a few setae on the head and the lateral cilia of the pronotum and elytra.
