= Maladera ganglbaueri =

Scientific classification
- Kingdom: Animalia
- Phylum: Arthropoda
- Class: Insecta
- Order: Coleoptera
- Suborder: Polyphaga
- Infraorder: Scarabaeiformia
- Family: Scarabaeidae
- Genus: Maladera
- Species: M. ganglbaueri

Binomial name
- Maladera ganglbaueri (Brenske, 1899)

Synonyms
- Autoserica ganglbaueri Brenske, 1899

Species of beetle

Maladera ganglbaueri is a species of beetle of the family Scarabaeidae. It is found in Indonesia (Borneo).

== Description ==
Adults reach a length of about 10.8 mm. They are densely tomentose, dark reddish-brown and opalescent. The anterior margin of the pronotum is not projecting, the lateral margin weakly rounded and the hind angles broadly rounded. The scutellum is very broad and long-pointed. The elytra are punctate in rows, with the intervals sparsely punctate and somewhat raised. The sutural angle has a strong seta.
