= Maladera infuscata =

Scientific classification
- Kingdom: Animalia
- Phylum: Arthropoda
- Clade: Pancrustacea
- Class: Insecta
- Order: Coleoptera
- Suborder: Polyphaga
- Infraorder: Scarabaeiformia
- Family: Scarabaeidae
- Genus: Maladera
- Species: M. infuscata

Binomial name
- Maladera infuscata (Moser, 1915)

Synonyms
- Autoserica infuscata Moser, 1915; Autoserica koreana Moser, 1919; Aserica okamotoi Murayama, 1938

Species of beetle

Maladera infuscata is a species of beetle of the family Scarabaeidae. It is found in China (Fujian, Hubei, Jiangxi, Nei Mongol, Shandong) and Korea.

== Description ==
Adults reach a length of about 9.1 mm. They have a reddish brown, oval body. The antennae are yellow. The labroclypeus is shiny, but the remainder of the dorsal surface is dull and glabrous, except for a few small setae on the head and elytra.
