= Maladera sumbana =

Scientific classification
- Kingdom: Animalia
- Phylum: Arthropoda
- Clade: Pancrustacea
- Class: Insecta
- Order: Coleoptera
- Suborder: Polyphaga
- Infraorder: Scarabaeiformia
- Family: Scarabaeidae
- Genus: Maladera
- Species: M. sumbana

Binomial name
- Maladera sumbana (Moser, 1915)

Synonyms
- Autoserica sumbana Moser, 1915

Species of beetle

Maladera sumbana is a species of beetle of the family Scarabaeidae. It is found in Indonesia (Sumba).

== Description ==
Adults reach a length of about 5 mm. They are reddish-brown and dull, with a dark head and shiny legs. The antennae are yellowish-brown. The pronotum is moderately densely punctate, the anterior margin and lateral margins fringed with hairs. The elytra are slightly furrowed and the furrows have irregular rows of punctures, while the interstices are unpunctate. Along the lateral margins of the elytra are solitary setae.
