= Maladera nitididorsis =

Scientific classification
- Kingdom: Animalia
- Phylum: Arthropoda
- Class: Insecta
- Order: Coleoptera
- Suborder: Polyphaga
- Infraorder: Scarabaeiformia
- Family: Scarabaeidae
- Genus: Maladera
- Species: M. nitididorsis

Binomial name
- Maladera nitididorsis Nomura, 1967

Species of beetle

Maladera nitididorsis is a species of beetle of the family Scarabaeidae. It is found in Japan.

== Description ==
Adults reach a length of about 8 mm. They have a rufous, elongate-oval, feebly convex, somewhat depressed body. The frons is piceous, while the clypeus and pronotum are infuscate. The dorsal surface, antennae and legs are shining and the ventral surface is opaque.

== Subspecies ==
- Maladera nitididorsis nitididorsis (Japan: Amami-Oshima)
- Maladera nitididorsis ootsuboi Kobayashi, 2009 (Japan: Tokunoshima Island)
