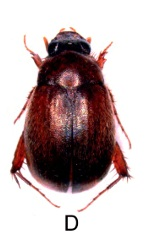

Scientific classification
- Kingdom: Animalia
- Phylum: Arthropoda
- Class: Insecta
- Order: Coleoptera
- Suborder: Polyphaga
- Infraorder: Scarabaeiformia
- Family: Scarabaeidae
- Genus: Maladera
- Species: M. bisornata

Binomial name
- Maladera bisornata Fabrizi & Ahrens, 2014

= Maladera bisornata =

Species of beetle

Maladera bisornata is a species of beetle of the family Scarabaeidae. It is found in Sri Lanka.

== Description ==
Adults reach a length of about 5.6–6 mm. They have a reddish brown, short oval body, with yellow antennae. The dorsal surface is shiny and densely finely setose.

== Etymology ==
The name of the species is derived from Latin bis (meaning twice) and ornatus (meaning ornament) and refers to the particular shape of the aedeagus.
