= Maladera gibbiventris =

Scientific classification
- Kingdom: Animalia
- Phylum: Arthropoda
- Class: Insecta
- Order: Coleoptera
- Suborder: Polyphaga
- Infraorder: Scarabaeiformia
- Family: Scarabaeidae
- Genus: Maladera
- Species: M. gibbiventris

Binomial name
- Maladera gibbiventris (Brenske, 1898)

Synonyms
- Autoserica gibbiventris Brenske, 1898

Species of beetle

Maladera gibbiventris is a species of beetle of the family Scarabaeidae. It is found in China (Fujian, Guangdong, Guizhou, Hubei, Hunan, Jiangxi, Shaanxi, Zhejiang), North Korea, South Korea and Taiwan.

== Description ==
Adults reach a length of about 9–12 mm. They have a dark brown, wide oval body. The antennae are yellowish brown. The dorsal surface is mostly dull (the labroclypeus, tarsomeres and tibiae are shiny) and glabrous.
