= Maladera tomentosa =

Scientific classification
- Kingdom: Animalia
- Phylum: Arthropoda
- Class: Insecta
- Order: Coleoptera
- Suborder: Polyphaga
- Infraorder: Scarabaeiformia
- Family: Scarabaeidae
- Genus: Maladera
- Species: M. tomentosa

Binomial name
- Maladera tomentosa (Frey, 1972)

Synonyms
- Cephaloserica tomentosa Frey, 1972

Species of beetle

Maladera tomentosa is a species of beetle of the family Scarabaeidae. It is found in Vietnam.

== Description ==
Adults reach a length of about 6 mm. The upper surface is blackish-brown, dull and tomentose and the clypeus is shiny. The underside and antennae are brown. The anterior and lateral margins of the pronotum, as well as lateral margins of the elytra are sparsely fringed with cilia. Tiny setae are present in the punctures of the pronotum and elytra. On the elytra, there are also a few very scattered, longer, whitish, erect setae.
