= Maladera crenolatipes =

Scientific classification
- Kingdom: Animalia
- Phylum: Arthropoda
- Class: Insecta
- Order: Coleoptera
- Suborder: Polyphaga
- Infraorder: Scarabaeiformia
- Family: Scarabaeidae
- Genus: Maladera
- Species: M. crenolatipes

Binomial name
- Maladera crenolatipes Ahrens, Fabrizi & Liu, 2021

Species of beetle

Maladera crenolatipes is a species of beetle of the family Scarabaeidae. It is found in China (Hunan).

== Description ==
Adults reach a length of about 6.4–7.7 mm. They have a dark brown, oval body. The antennae are yellow. The labroclypeus is shiny, but the remainder of the dorsal surface is dull and, except for a few small setae on the head and elytra, glabrous.

== Etymology ==
The species name is derived from Latin crenatus (meaning serrate), latus (meaning side) and pes (meaning feet) and refers to the longitudinal serrated line on the metatibia.
