= Maladera breviclava =

Scientific classification
- Kingdom: Animalia
- Phylum: Arthropoda
- Class: Insecta
- Order: Coleoptera
- Suborder: Polyphaga
- Infraorder: Scarabaeiformia
- Family: Scarabaeidae
- Genus: Maladera
- Species: M. breviclava

Binomial name
- Maladera breviclava Ahrens, Fabrizi & Liu, 2021

Species of beetle

Maladera breviclava is a species of beetle of the family Scarabaeidae. It is found in China (Yunnan).

== Description ==
Adults reach a length of about 12.9–14.2 mm. They have a dark blackish brown, long-oval body. The antennae are yellowish brown. The dorsal surface is dull (but the tibiae and tarsi are shiny) and nearly glabrous, except the lateral setae of the pronotum and elytra as well as a few erect setae on the head.

== Etymology ==
The species name is derived from Latin brevis (meaning short) and clavus (meaning club) and refers on the short antennal club of the species.
