= Maladera analis =

Scientific classification
- Kingdom: Animalia
- Phylum: Arthropoda
- Class: Insecta
- Order: Coleoptera
- Suborder: Polyphaga
- Infraorder: Scarabaeiformia
- Family: Scarabaeidae
- Genus: Maladera
- Species: M. analis

Binomial name
- Maladera analis (Brenske, 1899)

Synonyms
- Autoserica analis Brenske, 1899

Species of beetle

Maladera analis is a species of beetle of the family Scarabaeidae. It is found in the Philippines (Luzon).

== Description ==
Adults reach a length of about 5.5–6 mm. They are blackish-brown and dull with a silky sheen. The clypens is broad, densely and coarsely punctured and with a narrow red border. The posterior pronotal angles are weakly rounded, the margins with short setae. In the elytral striae, the strong punctures are arranged in rows, while the narrow intervals are almost puncture-free and only slightly raised, but nevertheless stand out very clearly beneath the tomentum.
