= Maladera caifensis =

Scientific classification
- Kingdom: Animalia
- Phylum: Arthropoda
- Class: Insecta
- Order: Coleoptera
- Suborder: Polyphaga
- Infraorder: Scarabaeiformia
- Family: Scarabaeidae
- Genus: Maladera
- Species: M. caifensis

Binomial name
- Maladera caifensis (Brenske, 1898)

Synonyms
- Autoserica caifensis Brenske, 1898; Autoserica flavipennis Moser, 1918

Species of beetle

Maladera caifensis is a species of beetle of the family Scarabaeidae. It is found in India (Goa, Karnataka, Kerala, Tamil Nadu).

== Description ==
Adults reach a length of about 6.5-7 mm. They are yellow and shiny, with the head, pronotum, scutellum and legs reddish-yellow. The frons is moderately densely punctate and the antennae are yellow. The pronotum is fairly densely punctate and the elytra have rows of punctures, with the intervals moderately densely punctate.
