= Maladera stolida =

Scientific classification
- Kingdom: Animalia
- Phylum: Arthropoda
- Class: Insecta
- Order: Coleoptera
- Suborder: Polyphaga
- Infraorder: Scarabaeiformia
- Family: Scarabaeidae
- Genus: Maladera
- Species: M. stolida

Binomial name
- Maladera stolida (Brenske, 1899)

Synonyms
- Autoserica stolida Brenske, 1899

Species of beetle

Maladera stolida is a species of beetle of the family Scarabaeidae. It is found in the Philippines (Palawan).

== Description ==
Adults reach a length of about 7 mm. They are dull, dark, greenish-tinged and opalescent. The clypeus is broad, weakly margined and very finely punctate, the frons behind the suture still without tomentum. The pronotum is not projecting anteriorly, weakly rounded at the sides, becoming slightly wider posteriorly with scarcely rounded hind angles. The elytra are coarsely punctate in rows, densely wrinkled beside them.
