= Maladera tyrannica =

Scientific classification
- Kingdom: Animalia
- Phylum: Arthropoda
- Class: Insecta
- Order: Coleoptera
- Suborder: Polyphaga
- Infraorder: Scarabaeiformia
- Family: Scarabaeidae
- Genus: Maladera
- Species: M. tyrannica

Binomial name
- Maladera tyrannica (Brenske, 1894)

Synonyms
- Serica tyrannica Brenske, 1894; Autoserica opalescens Moser, 1915

Species of beetle

Maladera tyrannica is a species of beetle of the family Scarabaeidae. It is found in India (Andhra Pradesh, Chhattisgarh, Jharkhand, Karnataka, Kerala, Madhya Pradesh, Tamil Nadu).

== Description ==
Adults reach a length of about 9.5 mm. They have a dark brown, oblong-oval body, with yellowish antennae. The dorsal surface is mostly dull and glabrous, except for a few short setae on the sides of the elytra.
