= Maladera kinabaluensis =

Scientific classification
- Kingdom: Animalia
- Phylum: Arthropoda
- Class: Insecta
- Order: Coleoptera
- Suborder: Polyphaga
- Infraorder: Scarabaeiformia
- Family: Scarabaeidae
- Genus: Maladera
- Species: M. kinabaluensis

Binomial name
- Maladera kinabaluensis (Brenske, 1899)

Synonyms
- Autoserica kinabaluensis Brenske, 1899

Species of beetle

Maladera kinabaluensis is a species of beetle of the family Scarabaeidae. It is found in Malaysia (Sabah).

== Description ==
Adults reach a length of about 6.7 mm. They are reddish-brown to blackish-brown, dull and slightly opalescent. The pronotum is straight anteriorly, slightly rounded at the sides, the hind angles almost angular, not rounded and coarsely punctate. The scutellum is pointed. The elytra are striated in rows, with the intervals broad, but almost without punctures.
