= Maladera diversipes =

Scientific classification
- Kingdom: Animalia
- Phylum: Arthropoda
- Clade: Pancrustacea
- Class: Insecta
- Order: Coleoptera
- Suborder: Polyphaga
- Infraorder: Scarabaeiformia
- Family: Scarabaeidae
- Genus: Maladera
- Species: M. diversipes

Binomial name
- Maladera diversipes (Moser, 1915)

Synonyms
- Autoserica diversipes Moser, 1915

Species of beetle

Maladera diversipes is a species of beetle of the family Scarabaeidae. It is found in China (Fujian, Guangdong, Hubei, Hunan, Jiangxi, Shaanxi, Zhejiang).

== Description ==
Adults reach a length of about 9.5 mm. They have a dark to dark reddish brown, oval body. The antennae are yellow. The labroclypeus is shiny, but the remainder of the dorsal surface is dull and glabrous, except for a few small setae on the head and elytra.
