= Maladera lushanensis =

Scientific classification
- Kingdom: Animalia
- Phylum: Arthropoda
- Class: Insecta
- Order: Coleoptera
- Suborder: Polyphaga
- Infraorder: Scarabaeiformia
- Family: Scarabaeidae
- Genus: Maladera
- Species: M. lushanensis

Binomial name
- Maladera lushanensis Ahrens, Fabrizi & Liu, 2021

Species of beetle

Maladera lushanensis is a species of beetle of the family Scarabaeidae. It is found in China (Fujian, Guangdong, Guangxi, Jiangxi, Sichuan, Yunnan) and Vietnam.

== Description ==
Adults reach a length of about 10.4–11.8 mm. They have a dark brown, oval body. The antennae are yellowish brown. The dorsal surface is dull (but the labroclypeus, tarsomeres and tibiae are shiny) and glabrous.

== Etymology ==
The species is named after the type locality, Lushan mountain.
