= Maladera celebensis =

Scientific classification
- Kingdom: Animalia
- Phylum: Arthropoda
- Clade: Pancrustacea
- Class: Insecta
- Order: Coleoptera
- Suborder: Polyphaga
- Infraorder: Scarabaeiformia
- Family: Scarabaeidae
- Genus: Maladera
- Species: M. celebensis

Binomial name
- Maladera celebensis (Moser, 1915)

Synonyms
- Autoserica celebensis Moser, 1915

Species of beetle

Maladera celebensis is a species of beetle of the family Scarabaeidae. It is found in Indonesia (Sulawesi).

== Description ==
Adults reach a length of about 7 mm. They are reddish-brown and dull. The frons is almost black and is finely and widely punctate. The antennae are yellowish-brown. The pronotum is fairly densely covered with minute setae and the elytra have rows of punctures, with the spaces between them only very slightly convex and fairly extensively covered with punctures with tiny setae.
