= Maladera lignicolor =

Scientific classification
- Kingdom: Animalia
- Phylum: Arthropoda
- Class: Insecta
- Order: Coleoptera
- Suborder: Polyphaga
- Infraorder: Scarabaeiformia
- Family: Scarabaeidae
- Genus: Maladera
- Species: M. lignicolor

Binomial name
- Maladera lignicolor (Fairmaire, 1887)

Synonyms
- Serica lignicolor Fairmaire, 1887; Autoserica laboriosa Brenske, 1897; Aserica fusiana Murayama, 1934; Serica tenebrosa Frey, 1972

Species of beetle

Maladera lignicolor is a species of beetle of the family Scarabaeidae. It is found in China (Fujian, Guangdong, Hubei, Sichuan, Zhejiang), North Korea, South Korea and Taiwan.

== Description ==
Adults reach a length of about 8.4 mm. They have an oval, dull, dark brown body, with yellow antennae.
