= Maladera cariniceps =

Scientific classification
- Kingdom: Animalia
- Phylum: Arthropoda
- Clade: Pancrustacea
- Class: Insecta
- Order: Coleoptera
- Suborder: Polyphaga
- Infraorder: Scarabaeiformia
- Family: Scarabaeidae
- Genus: Maladera
- Species: M. cariniceps

Binomial name
- Maladera cariniceps (Moser, 1915)

Synonyms
- Autoserica cariniceps Moser, 1915; Aserica cariniceps; Aserica fusania Murayama, 1934

Species of beetle

Maladera cariniceps is a species of beetle of the family Scarabaeidae. It is found in China (Beijing, Fujian, Henan, Hubei, Nei Mongol, Shaanxi, Sichuan, Zhejiang), Japan, North Korea and South Korea.

== Description ==
Adults reach a length of about 8.8 mm. They have an oval, dull, blackish brown body, with yellow antennae.
