= Maladera sontica =

Scientific classification
- Kingdom: Animalia
- Phylum: Arthropoda
- Class: Insecta
- Order: Coleoptera
- Suborder: Polyphaga
- Infraorder: Scarabaeiformia
- Family: Scarabaeidae
- Genus: Maladera
- Species: M. sontica

Binomial name
- Maladera sontica (Brenske, 1899)

Synonyms
- Autoserica sontica Brenske, 1899

Species of beetle

Maladera sontica is a species of beetle of the family Scarabaeidae. It is found in China (Anhui, Jiangxi, Sichuan, Xizang, Yunnan), India (Arunachal Pradesh), Laos, Myanmar, Thailand and Vietnam.

== Description ==
Adults reach a length of about 7.8 mm. They have a reddish brown, oblong-oval body. The antennae are yellowish. The surface is dull (but the labroclypeus is shiny) and glabrous, except for a few short setae on sides of the elytra.
