= Maladera allopruinosa =

Scientific classification
- Kingdom: Animalia
- Phylum: Arthropoda
- Class: Insecta
- Order: Coleoptera
- Suborder: Polyphaga
- Infraorder: Scarabaeiformia
- Family: Scarabaeidae
- Genus: Maladera
- Species: M. allopruinosa

Binomial name
- Maladera allopruinosa (Ahrens, 1998)

Synonyms
- Serica pruinosa Burmeister, 1855 (preocc.); Serica allopruinosa Ahrens, 1998

Species of beetle

Maladera allopruinosa is a species of beetle of the family Scarabaeidae. It is found in the lowlands of Nepal and northern India (the foot of the Himalayas).

== Description ==
Adults reach a length of about 9.3–10.6 mm. They have a reddish-brown to dark brown, oval body. The upper surface is mostly dull and glabrous, except for a few hairs and the lateral cilia of the pronotum and elytra.
