= Maladera costigera =

Scientific classification
- Kingdom: Animalia
- Phylum: Arthropoda
- Class: Insecta
- Order: Coleoptera
- Suborder: Polyphaga
- Infraorder: Scarabaeiformia
- Family: Scarabaeidae
- Genus: Maladera
- Species: M. costigera

Binomial name
- Maladera costigera (Blanchard, 1850)

Synonyms
- Omaloplia costigera Blanchard, 1850

Species of beetle

Maladera costigera is a species of beetle of the family Scarabaeidae. It is found in Malaysia and Singapore.

== Description ==
They are brownish-rusty, slightly greenish above. The head is coppery and punctate, and the clypeus is red. The antennae are testaceous-rufous. The pronotum is broad, greenish-brown, and somewhat glossy, as well as punctate. The elytra are silky, brownish-rusty, furrowed, ribbed at the interstices, and punctate everywhere. The legs are brownish-red.
