= Maladera hunanensis =

Scientific classification
- Kingdom: Animalia
- Phylum: Arthropoda
- Class: Insecta
- Order: Coleoptera
- Suborder: Polyphaga
- Infraorder: Scarabaeiformia
- Family: Scarabaeidae
- Genus: Maladera
- Species: M. hunanensis

Binomial name
- Maladera hunanensis Ahrens, Fabrizi & Liu, 2021

Species of beetle

Maladera hunanensis is a species of beetle of the family Scarabaeidae. It is found in China (Guangdong, Guangxi, Hunan).

== Description ==
Adults reach a length of about 8.1–9.2 mm. They have a dark reddish brown, elongate body. The dorsal surface is dull (but the labroclypeus, tibiae and tarsi are shiny) and nearly glabrous, except for the lateral setae of the pronotum and elytra and a few setae on the head.

== Etymology ==
The species name refers to its occurrence in Hunan.
