= Maladera ovatula =

Scientific classification
- Kingdom: Animalia
- Phylum: Arthropoda
- Class: Insecta
- Order: Coleoptera
- Suborder: Polyphaga
- Infraorder: Scarabaeiformia
- Family: Scarabaeidae
- Genus: Maladera
- Species: M. ovatula

Binomial name
- Maladera ovatula (Fairmaire, 1891)

Synonyms
- Serica ovatula Fairmaire, 1891

Species of beetle

Maladera ovatula is a species of beetle of the family Scarabaeidae. It is found in China (Hainan, Hebei, Hubei, Ningxia, Shaanxi, Sichuan, Yunnan, Zhejiang).

== Description ==
Adults reach a length of about 6.6–8.5 mm. They have a reddish brown, oblong-oval body. The antennae are yellowish. The surface is dull (but the labroclypeus is shiny) and glabrous, except for a few short setae on sides of the elytra.
