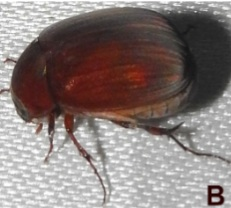

Scientific classification
- Kingdom: Animalia
- Phylum: Arthropoda
- Class: Insecta
- Order: Coleoptera
- Suborder: Polyphaga
- Infraorder: Scarabaeiformia
- Family: Scarabaeidae
- Genus: Maladera
- Species: M. bandarwelana

Binomial name
- Maladera bandarwelana Fabrizi & Ahrens, 2014

= Maladera bandarwelana =

Species of beetle

Maladera bandarwelana is a species of beetle of the family Scarabaeidae. It is found in Sri Lanka.

== Description ==
Adults reach a length of about 9.7–11.2 mm. They have an oval dark brown body. The antennae are yellow.

== Etymology ==
The species is named after the type location 'Bandarwela'.
