= Maladera erlangshanica =

Scientific classification
- Kingdom: Animalia
- Phylum: Arthropoda
- Class: Insecta
- Order: Coleoptera
- Suborder: Polyphaga
- Infraorder: Scarabaeiformia
- Family: Scarabaeidae
- Genus: Maladera
- Species: M. erlangshanica

Binomial name
- Maladera erlangshanica Ahrens, Fabrizi & Liu, 2021

Species of beetle

Maladera erlangshanica is a species of beetle of the family Scarabaeidae. It is found in China (Sichuan).

== Description ==
Adults reach a length of about 9.4–11.5 mm. They have a dark reddish brown, egg-shaped body. The dorsal surface is dull (but the labroclypeus, tibiae and tarsi are shiny) and nearly glabrous, except for the lateral setae of the pronotum and elytra and a few setae on the head.

== Etymology ==
The species is named after its occurrence in the Erlang Shan.
