= Maladera pallida =

Scientific classification
- Kingdom: Animalia
- Phylum: Arthropoda
- Class: Insecta
- Order: Coleoptera
- Suborder: Polyphaga
- Infraorder: Scarabaeiformia
- Family: Scarabaeidae
- Genus: Maladera
- Species: M. pallida

Binomial name
- Maladera pallida (Burmeister, 1855)

Synonyms
- Serica pallida Burmeister, 1855; Maladera ludipennis Miyake, Yamaguchi & Akiyama, 2002

Species of beetle

Maladera pallida is a species of beetle of the family Scarabaeidae. It is found in China (Hong Kong) and Laos, Thailand and Vietnam.

== Description ==
Adults reach a length of about 4.9 mm. They have an oblong-oval body. The dorsal surface is yellowish brown and dull. The antennae are yellow. The head is shiny and the dorsal surface is nearly glabrous, except for some single setae on the head.
