= Maladera shiwandashanensis =

Scientific classification
- Kingdom: Animalia
- Phylum: Arthropoda
- Class: Insecta
- Order: Coleoptera
- Suborder: Polyphaga
- Infraorder: Scarabaeiformia
- Family: Scarabaeidae
- Genus: Maladera
- Species: M. shiwandashanensis

Binomial name
- Maladera shiwandashanensis Ahrens, Fabrizi & Liu, 2021

Species of beetle

Maladera shiwandashanensis is a species of beetle of the family Scarabaeidae. It is found in China (Guangxi) and Vietnam.

== Description ==
Adults reach a length of about 9.8–10.8 mm. They have a dark brown, wide, oval body. The antennae are yellowish brown. The dorsal surface is dull (but the labroclypeus, tarsomeres and tibiae are shiny) and glabrous.

== Etymology ==
The species is named after the type locality, the Shiwandashan National Forest Park.
