= Maladera cambodjana =

Scientific classification
- Kingdom: Animalia
- Phylum: Arthropoda
- Class: Insecta
- Order: Coleoptera
- Suborder: Polyphaga
- Infraorder: Scarabaeiformia
- Family: Scarabaeidae
- Genus: Maladera
- Species: M. cambodjana

Binomial name
- Maladera cambodjana (Frey, 1972)

Synonyms
- Autoserica cambodjana Frey, 1972

Species of beetle

Maladera cambodjana is a species of beetle of the family Scarabaeidae. It is found in Cambodia.

== Description ==
Adults reach a length of about 7 mm. The upper and lower surfaces are brown and dull. The clypeus is glossy and only the back of the head is tomentose. The margins of the pronotum and elytra are fringed with light brown setae and there are also some setae on the sides of the elytra, the thorax, apex of the pygidium and ventral segment. The latter is covered in rows with rather long setae.
