= Maladera strumina =

Scientific classification
- Kingdom: Animalia
- Phylum: Arthropoda
- Class: Insecta
- Order: Coleoptera
- Suborder: Polyphaga
- Infraorder: Scarabaeiformia
- Family: Scarabaeidae
- Genus: Maladera
- Species: M. strumina

Binomial name
- Maladera strumina (Brenske, 1899)

Synonyms
- Autoserica strumina Brenske, 1899

Species of beetle

Maladera strumina is a species of beetle of the family Scarabaeidae. It is found on Borneo.

== Description ==
Adults reach a length of about 7 mm. They are blackish-brown or reddish-brown (but the legs are brown), dull and silky. The pronotum is straight anteriorly, slightly rounded at the sides, the posterior angles not rounded and the surface widely punctate. The elytra are not punctate in the striae. The intervals (with the exception of the first which has punctures) are very narrow and unpunctate, but distinct.
