= Maladera anhuiensis =

Scientific classification
- Kingdom: Animalia
- Phylum: Arthropoda
- Class: Insecta
- Order: Coleoptera
- Suborder: Polyphaga
- Infraorder: Scarabaeiformia
- Family: Scarabaeidae
- Genus: Maladera
- Species: M. anhuiensis

Binomial name
- Maladera anhuiensis Ahrens, Fabrizi & Liu, 2021

Species of beetle

Maladera anhuiensis is a species of beetle of the family Scarabaeidae. It is found in China (Anhui, Fujian, Jiangxi).

== Description ==
Adults reach a length of about 8.8–9.1 mm. They have a reddish brown, oval body. The antennae are yellow. The labroclypeus is shiny, but the remainder of the dorsal surface is dull and glabrous, except for a few small setae on the head and elytra.

== Etymology ==
The species name is derived from the occurrence of the taxon in the Anhui province.
