= Maladera rotundata =

Scientific classification
- Kingdom: Animalia
- Phylum: Arthropoda
- Class: Insecta
- Order: Coleoptera
- Suborder: Polyphaga
- Infraorder: Scarabaeiformia
- Family: Scarabaeidae
- Genus: Maladera
- Species: M. rotundata

Binomial name
- Maladera rotundata (Walker, 1859)

Synonyms
- Sericesthis rotundata Walker, 1859; Autoserica immunita Brenske, 1898; Autoserica srilanka Frey, 1974

Species of beetle

Maladera rotundata is a species of beetle of the family Scarabaeidae. It is found in Sri Lanka.

== Description ==
Adults reach a length of about 8.3-9.5 mm. They have a reddish brown, oval body with a weak iridescent shine. The antennae are yellow. The dorsal surface is dull and glabrous, except for a few small setae on the head and the lateral margins of the pronotum and elytra.
