= Maladera tibialis =

Scientific classification
- Kingdom: Animalia
- Phylum: Arthropoda
- Class: Insecta
- Order: Coleoptera
- Suborder: Polyphaga
- Infraorder: Scarabaeiformia
- Family: Scarabaeidae
- Genus: Maladera
- Species: M. tibialis

Binomial name
- Maladera tibialis (Brenske, 1899)

Synonyms
- Autoserica tibialis Brenske, 1899

Species of beetle

Maladera tibialis is a species of beetle of the family Scarabaeidae. It is found in Cambodia, Laos, Malaysia, Thailand, Vietnam and China (Fujian, Guangdong, Hunan, Zhejiang).

== Description ==
Adults reach a length of about 8.9 mm. They have a reddish to dark reddish brown, oblong body, with yellowish antennae. The dorsal surface is mostly dull and glabrous, except for a few setae on the head and along the sides of the elytra.
