= Maladera bengalensis =

Scientific classification
- Kingdom: Animalia
- Phylum: Arthropoda
- Class: Insecta
- Order: Coleoptera
- Suborder: Polyphaga
- Infraorder: Scarabaeiformia
- Family: Scarabaeidae
- Genus: Maladera
- Species: M. bengalensis

Binomial name
- Maladera bengalensis (Brenske, 1899)

Synonyms
- Autoserica bengalensis Brenske, 1899

Species of beetle

Maladera bengalensis is a species of beetle of the family Scarabaeidae. It is found in India (Bihar, Chhattisgarh, Goa, Madhya Pradesh, Uttarakhand, West Bengal) and Nepal.

== Description ==
Adults reach a length of about 7–8.4 mm. They have a reddish brown to dark brown, oval body. The upper surface is mostly dull and glabrous, except for some setae on the head and the lateral cilia of the pronotum and elytra.
