= Maladera excisilabrata =

Scientific classification
- Kingdom: Animalia
- Phylum: Arthropoda
- Class: Insecta
- Order: Coleoptera
- Suborder: Polyphaga
- Infraorder: Scarabaeiformia
- Family: Scarabaeidae
- Genus: Maladera
- Species: M. excisilabrata

Binomial name
- Maladera excisilabrata Ahrens, Fabrizi & Liu, 2021

Species of beetle

Maladera excisilabrata is a species of beetle of the family Scarabaeidae. It is found in China (Jiangxi).

== Description ==
Adults reach a length of about 9.9 mm. They have a reddish brown, oval body. The antennae are brown. The head and pronotum are weakly shiny, while the remainder of the dorsal surface is dull and glabrous.

== Etymology ==
The species name is derived from Latin excisus (meaning emarginate) and labratus (meaning with labrum) and refers to the deeply excavated labrum.
