= Maladera maoershana =

Scientific classification
- Kingdom: Animalia
- Phylum: Arthropoda
- Class: Insecta
- Order: Coleoptera
- Suborder: Polyphaga
- Infraorder: Scarabaeiformia
- Family: Scarabaeidae
- Genus: Maladera
- Species: M. maoershana

Binomial name
- Maladera maoershana Ahrens, Fabrizi & Liu, 2021

Species of beetle

Maladera maoershana is a species of beetle of the family Scarabaeidae. It is found in China (Guangxi).

== Description ==
Adults reach a length of about 8.4–9.2 mm. They have a dark brown, oblong oval body, with yellowish antennae. The labroclypeus, anterior frons and pronotum are shiny, while the remainder of the dorsal surface is dull. They are glabrous, except for a few long setae on the head, pronotum and elytra.

== Etymology ==
The species name refers to its type locality, Mao Ershan.
