= Maladera xinqiaoensis =

Scientific classification
- Kingdom: Animalia
- Phylum: Arthropoda
- Class: Insecta
- Order: Coleoptera
- Suborder: Polyphaga
- Infraorder: Scarabaeiformia
- Family: Scarabaeidae
- Genus: Maladera
- Species: M. xinqiaoensis

Binomial name
- Maladera xinqiaoensis Ahrens, Fabrizi & Liu, 2021

Species of beetle

Maladera xinqiaoensis is a species of beetle of the family Scarabaeidae. It is found in China (Fujian, Guizhou).

== Description ==
Adults reach a length of about 7–8.4 mm. They have a reddish brown, oval body. The head is darker and the antennae are yellowish. The dorsal surface is dull (but the labroclypeus, tarsomeres, and tibiae are shiny) and glabrous.

== Etymology ==
The species name is derived from its type locality, Xinqiao.
