= Maladera dahanshana =

Scientific classification
- Kingdom: Animalia
- Phylum: Arthropoda
- Class: Insecta
- Order: Coleoptera
- Suborder: Polyphaga
- Infraorder: Scarabaeiformia
- Family: Scarabaeidae
- Genus: Maladera
- Species: M. dahanshana

Binomial name
- Maladera dahanshana Kobayashi, 2016

Species of beetle

Maladera dahanshana is a species of beetle of the family Scarabaeidae. It is found in Taiwan.

== Description ==
Adults reach a length of about 8.5–9 mm. They have an elongate oval body. They are dark reddish brown to blackish brown, with the antennae dark yellowish brown and the ventral surface and legs reddish brown to dark reddish brown. The dorsal and ventral surface are almost opaque, while most of the legs are shining.

== Etymology ==
The species is named after its type locality, Mt. Dahanshan, South Taiwan.
