= Maladera peregoi =

Scientific classification
- Kingdom: Animalia
- Phylum: Arthropoda
- Class: Insecta
- Order: Coleoptera
- Suborder: Polyphaga
- Infraorder: Scarabaeiformia
- Family: Scarabaeidae
- Genus: Maladera
- Species: M. peregoi

Binomial name
- Maladera peregoi Ahrens, Fabrizi & Liu, 2021

Species of beetle

Maladera peregoi is a species of beetle of the family Scarabaeidae. It is found in China (Yunnan) and Laos, Myanmar, Thailand and Vietnam.

== Description ==
Adults reach a length of about 5–5.8 mm. They have an oblong-oval body. The dorsal surface is reddish brown and dull. The antennae are yellow. The head is shiny and the dorsal surface is nearly glabrous, except for some single setae on the head.

== Etymology ==
The species name refers to one of its collectors, R. Perego.
