= Maladera wandingana =

Scientific classification
- Kingdom: Animalia
- Phylum: Arthropoda
- Class: Insecta
- Order: Coleoptera
- Suborder: Polyphaga
- Infraorder: Scarabaeiformia
- Family: Scarabaeidae
- Genus: Maladera
- Species: M. wandingana

Binomial name
- Maladera wandingana Ahrens, Fabrizi & Liu, 2021

Species of beetle

Maladera wandingana is a species of beetle of the family Scarabaeidae. It is found in China (Yunnan).

== Description ==
Adults reach a length of about 9.8 mm. They have a dark brown, oval body. The legs are brown and the antennae are yellow. The dorsal surface is dull (but the labroclypeus, tarsomeres, and tibiae are shiny) and, except for the long setae of the head and along the margins of the pronotum and elytra, glabrous.

== Etymology ==
The species name refers to its type locality, Wanding.
