= Maladera yongrenensis =

Scientific classification
- Kingdom: Animalia
- Phylum: Arthropoda
- Class: Insecta
- Order: Coleoptera
- Suborder: Polyphaga
- Infraorder: Scarabaeiformia
- Family: Scarabaeidae
- Genus: Maladera
- Species: M. yongrenensis

Binomial name
- Maladera yongrenensis Ahrens, Fabrizi & Liu, 2021

Species of beetle

Maladera yongrenensis is a species of beetle of the family Scarabaeidae. It is found in China (Sichuan, Yunnan).

== Description ==
Adults reach a length of about 7.1–7.6 mm. They have an oblong-oval body. The dorsal surface is dark brown and dull, while the ventral surface is reddish brown. The antennae are yellow. Except for some single setae on the head, the dorsal surface is nearly glabrous.

== Etymology ==
The species name refers to its type locality, Yong Ren.
