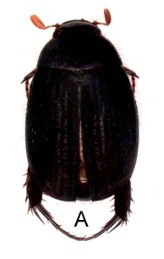

Scientific classification
- Kingdom: Animalia
- Phylum: Arthropoda
- Class: Insecta
- Order: Coleoptera
- Suborder: Polyphaga
- Infraorder: Scarabaeiformia
- Family: Scarabaeidae
- Genus: Maladera
- Species: M. calcarata

Binomial name
- Maladera calcarata (Brenske, 1898)

Synonyms
- Autoserica calcarata Brenske, 1898

= Maladera calcarata =

Species of beetle

Maladera calcarata is a species of beetle of the family Scarabaeidae. It is found in Sri Lanka.

== Description ==
Adults reach a length of about 8.8-9.7 mm. They have an oval black body, sometimes partly dark brown or with a dull greenish tinge. The antennae are yellow.
