= Maladera dahongshanica =

Scientific classification
- Kingdom: Animalia
- Phylum: Arthropoda
- Class: Insecta
- Order: Coleoptera
- Suborder: Polyphaga
- Infraorder: Scarabaeiformia
- Family: Scarabaeidae
- Genus: Maladera
- Species: M. dahongshanica

Binomial name
- Maladera dahongshanica Ahrens, Fabrizi & Liu, 2021

Species of beetle

Maladera dahongshanica is a species of beetle of the family Scarabaeidae. It is found in China (Hubei, Hunan, Sichuan).

== Description ==
Adults reach a length of about 8.5–9.6 mm. They have a dark reddish brown, oval body. The antennae are yellow. The labroclypeus is shiny, but the remainder of the dorsal surface is dull and glabrous, except for a few small setae on the head and elytra.

== Etymology ==
The species is named after the type locality, Dahongshan.
