= Maladera davaoana =

Scientific classification
- Kingdom: Animalia
- Phylum: Arthropoda
- Clade: Pancrustacea
- Class: Insecta
- Order: Coleoptera
- Suborder: Polyphaga
- Infraorder: Scarabaeiformia
- Family: Scarabaeidae
- Genus: Maladera
- Species: M. davaoana

Binomial name
- Maladera davaoana (Moser, 1921)

Synonyms
- Autoserica davaoana Moser, 1921

Species of beetle

Maladera davaoana is a species of beetle of the family Scarabaeidae. It is found in the Philippines (Mindanao).

== Description ==
Adults reach a length of about 8 mm. They are blackish-brown and opaque, with brown, shiny legs. The frons is punctate and the antennae are reddish-yellow. The pronotum is subtly punctate and the elytra are seriato-punctate, with the interstices slightly covered with punctures, which are minutely setose.
