= Maladera siwalikiana =

Scientific classification
- Kingdom: Animalia
- Phylum: Arthropoda
- Clade: Pancrustacea
- Class: Insecta
- Order: Coleoptera
- Suborder: Polyphaga
- Infraorder: Scarabaeiformia
- Family: Scarabaeidae
- Genus: Maladera
- Species: M. siwalikiana

Binomial name
- Maladera siwalikiana Ahrens, 2004

Species of beetle

Maladera siwalikiana is a species of beetle of the family Scarabaeidae. It is found in the lowlands of Nepal and north-western India (the foot of the Himalayas).

== Description ==
Adults reach a length of about 7.7–9.1 mm. They have a reddish-brown, oval body. The upper surface is mostly dull and glabrous, except for some setae on the head and the lateral clia of the pronotum and elytra.

== Etymology ==
The species is named for its occurrence in the Sivalik Hills.
