= Maladera hmong =

Scientific classification
- Kingdom: Animalia
- Phylum: Arthropoda
- Clade: Pancrustacea
- Class: Insecta
- Order: Coleoptera
- Suborder: Polyphaga
- Infraorder: Scarabaeiformia
- Family: Scarabaeidae
- Genus: Maladera
- Species: M. hmong

Binomial name
- Maladera hmong Ahrens, 2004

Species of beetle

Maladera hmong is a species of beetle of the family Scarabaeidae. It is found in Laos, Thailand, Vietnam, China (Yunnan) and Nepal.

== Description ==
Adults reach a length of about 7.4–7.6 mm. They have a reddish-brown, oval body. The upper surface is mostly dull and glabrous, except for some setae on the head and the lateral cilia of the pronotum and elytra.

== Etymology ==
The species is named for the Hmong people, an ethnic group living in the area where this species occurs.
