= Maladera thandigudiensis =

Scientific classification
- Kingdom: Animalia
- Phylum: Arthropoda
- Class: Insecta
- Order: Coleoptera
- Suborder: Polyphaga
- Infraorder: Scarabaeiformia
- Family: Scarabaeidae
- Genus: Maladera
- Species: M. thandigudiensis

Binomial name
- Maladera thandigudiensis Sreedevi & Ahrens, 2025

Species of beetle

Maladera thandigudiensis is a species of beetle of the family Scarabaeidae. It is found in India (Kerala, Tamil Nadu).

== Description ==
Adults reach a length of about 9.1 mm. They have an oval body. The dorsal and ventral surface are dark brown and mostly dull, partly with an iridescent shine. The antennae are yellowish. The dorsal surface is nearly glabrous, except for a few setae on the head.

== Etymology ==
The species is named after the type locality, Thandigudi.
