= Maladera dayaoshanica =

Scientific classification
- Kingdom: Animalia
- Phylum: Arthropoda
- Class: Insecta
- Order: Coleoptera
- Suborder: Polyphaga
- Infraorder: Scarabaeiformia
- Family: Scarabaeidae
- Genus: Maladera
- Species: M. dayaoshanica

Binomial name
- Maladera dayaoshanica Ahrens, Fabrizi & Liu, 2021

Species of beetle

Maladera dayaoshanica is a species of beetle of the family Scarabaeidae. It is found in China (Guangxi).

== Description ==
Adults reach a length of about 8.3–9 mm. They have a dark yellowish brown, dull, oval body, with the head and pronotum slightly darker and with yellow antennae. The labroclypeus is anteriorly shiny, and there are several short setae on the head and elytra.

== Etymology ==
The species is named after its type locality, the Dayaoshan mountains.
