= Maladera reyaensis =

Scientific classification
- Kingdom: Animalia
- Phylum: Arthropoda
- Class: Insecta
- Order: Coleoptera
- Suborder: Polyphaga
- Infraorder: Scarabaeiformia
- Family: Scarabaeidae
- Genus: Maladera
- Species: M. reyaensis

Binomial name
- Maladera reyaensis Bhunia, Chandra, Gupta & Ahrens, 2021

Species of beetle

Maladera reyaensis is a species of beetle of the family Scarabaeidae. It is found in India (Bihar, West Bengal).

== Description ==
Adults reach a length of about 10.2 mm. They have an oblong–oval body. The dorsal surface is dark brown, while the ventral surface is dark reddish-brown and dull. The antennae are yellowish. There are numerous long setae on the head, pronotum and elytra.

== Etymology ==
The species is named after its type locality, Reya in West Bengal.
