= Maladera carinifrons =

Scientific classification
- Kingdom: Animalia
- Phylum: Arthropoda
- Class: Insecta
- Order: Coleoptera
- Suborder: Polyphaga
- Infraorder: Scarabaeiformia
- Family: Scarabaeidae
- Genus: Maladera
- Species: M. carinifrons

Binomial name
- Maladera carinifrons (Brenske, 1896)

Synonyms
- Serica carinifions Brenske, 1896

Species of beetle

Maladera carinifrons is a species of beetle of the family Scarabaeidae. It is found in Sri Lanka and India (Jharkhand, Tamil Nadu).

== Description ==
Adults reach a length of about 6.7-7.7 mm. They have a light reddish brown, oblong-oval body. The elytra and antennae are yellowish brown. The dorsal surface is dull and glabrous, except for a few small setae on the head and the lateral margins of the pronotum and elytra.
