= Maladera vethi =

Scientific classification
- Kingdom: Animalia
- Phylum: Arthropoda
- Clade: Pancrustacea
- Class: Insecta
- Order: Coleoptera
- Suborder: Polyphaga
- Infraorder: Scarabaeiformia
- Family: Scarabaeidae
- Genus: Maladera
- Species: M. vethi

Binomial name
- Maladera vethi (Moser, 1916)

Synonyms
- Autoserica vethi Moser, 1916

Species of beetle

Maladera vethi is a species of beetle of the family Scarabaeidae. It is found in China (Guangxi), Thailand and Vietnam.

== Description ==
Adults reach a length of about 7.6 mm. They have a reddish brown, oblong body. The dorsal surface is mostly dull (although the labroclypeus, tarsi, and tibiae are shiny) and, except for the setae along the lateral margins of the pronotum and elytra, nearly glabrous.
