= Maladera reichenowi =

Scientific classification
- Kingdom: Animalia
- Phylum: Arthropoda
- Class: Insecta
- Order: Coleoptera
- Suborder: Polyphaga
- Infraorder: Scarabaeiformia
- Family: Scarabaeidae
- Genus: Maladera
- Species: M. reichenowi

Binomial name
- Maladera reichenowi (Brenske, 1902)

Synonyms
- Autoserica reichenowi Brenske, 1902

Species of beetle

Maladera reichenowi is a species of beetle of the family Scarabaeidae. It is found in Ghana.

== Description ==
Adults reach a length of about 7.5 mm. They have a dull, brown, slightly opalescent, oblong-oval body. The surface is finely punctate and the head somewhat metallic. The elytra are punctate in rows, with minute hairs and setae.

== Etymology ==
The species is named in honour of Professor Dr. A. Reichenow.
