= Maladera curtipes =

Scientific classification
- Kingdom: Animalia
- Phylum: Arthropoda
- Clade: Pancrustacea
- Class: Insecta
- Order: Coleoptera
- Suborder: Polyphaga
- Infraorder: Scarabaeiformia
- Family: Scarabaeidae
- Genus: Maladera
- Species: M. curtipes

Binomial name
- Maladera curtipes (Moser, 1915)

Synonyms
- Autoserica curtipes Moser, 1915

Species of beetle

Maladera curtipes is a species of beetle of the family Scarabaeidae. It is found in Indonesia (Sumbawa).

== Description ==
Adults reach a length of about 7.5 mm. They are dark reddish-brown and shiny. The antennae are reddish-yellow. The pronotum is moderately densely punctured and the lateral margins have setae. The elytra have rows of punctures, the intervals between them weakly convex and very widely punctured.
