= Maladera kryschanowskii =

Scientific classification
- Kingdom: Animalia
- Phylum: Arthropoda
- Class: Insecta
- Order: Coleoptera
- Suborder: Polyphaga
- Infraorder: Scarabaeiformia
- Family: Scarabaeidae
- Genus: Maladera
- Species: M. kryschanowskii

Binomial name
- Maladera kryschanowskii Ahrens, Fabrizi & Liu, 2021

Species of beetle

Maladera kryschanowskii is a species of beetle of the family Scarabaeidae. It is found in China (Yunnan).

== Description ==
Adults reach a length of about 6.4–6.5 mm. They have an oblong-oval body. They are yellowish brown and dull. The antennae are yellow. The head is shiny and the dorsal surface is nearly glabrous, except for some single setae on the head.

== Etymology ==
The species name refers to one of its collectors, Mr. Kryschanowski.
