= Maladera shikengkongensis =

Scientific classification
- Kingdom: Animalia
- Phylum: Arthropoda
- Class: Insecta
- Order: Coleoptera
- Suborder: Polyphaga
- Infraorder: Scarabaeiformia
- Family: Scarabaeidae
- Genus: Maladera
- Species: M. shikengkongensis

Binomial name
- Maladera shikengkongensis Zhao & Ahrens, 2023

Species of beetle

Maladera shikengkongensis is a species of beetle of the family Scarabaeidae. It is found in China (Guangdong).

== Description ==
Adults reach a length of about 10–10.4 mm. They have a reddish brown, weakly dull, elongated ovoid body. The frons is dark green and dull, while the pronotum and ventral surface are dark green. The antennae and legs are yellowish brown.

== Etymology ==
The species name refers to its type locality, Shikengkong in the Nanling Nature Reserve.
