= Maladera wuliangshanensis =

Scientific classification
- Kingdom: Animalia
- Phylum: Arthropoda
- Class: Insecta
- Order: Coleoptera
- Suborder: Polyphaga
- Infraorder: Scarabaeiformia
- Family: Scarabaeidae
- Genus: Maladera
- Species: M. wuliangshanensis

Binomial name
- Maladera wuliangshanensis Ahrens, Fabrizi & Liu, 2021

Species of beetle

Maladera wuliangshanensis is a species of beetle of the family Scarabaeidae. It is found in China (Yunnan).

== Description ==
Adults reach a length of about 9.7 mm. They have a dark reddish brown, oblong-oval body. The antennae are yellowish. The surface is dull (but the labroclypeus is shiny) and glabrous, except for a few short setae on the sides of the elytra.

== Etymology ==
The species is named after its type locality, Wuliang shan.
