= Maladera isarogensis =

Scientific classification
- Kingdom: Animalia
- Phylum: Arthropoda
- Clade: Pancrustacea
- Class: Insecta
- Order: Coleoptera
- Suborder: Polyphaga
- Infraorder: Scarabaeiformia
- Family: Scarabaeidae
- Genus: Maladera
- Species: M. isarogensis

Binomial name
- Maladera isarogensis (Moser, 1922)

Synonyms
- Autoserica isarogensis Moser, 1922

Species of beetle

Maladera isarogensis is a species of beetle of the family Scarabaeidae. It is found in the Philippines (Luzon).

== Description ==
Adults reach a length of about 6 mm. They are rufous and opaque. The head is sparsely punctate. The pronotum is subtly punctate, with the punctures near the sides very minutely setose. The elytra are slightly sulcate and moderately densely punctate. The punctures have very small setae.
