= Maladera hui =

Scientific classification
- Kingdom: Animalia
- Phylum: Arthropoda
- Class: Insecta
- Order: Coleoptera
- Suborder: Polyphaga
- Infraorder: Scarabaeiformia
- Family: Scarabaeidae
- Genus: Maladera
- Species: M. hui

Binomial name
- Maladera hui Ahrens, Fabrizi & Liu, 2021

Species of beetle

Maladera hui is a species of beetle of the family Scarabaeidae. It is found in China (Zhejiang).

== Description ==
Adults reach a length of about 8.6 mm. They have a dark brown, oblong oval body, with yellowish antennae. The labroclypeus, anterior frons and pronotum are shiny, while the remainder of the dorsal surface is dull. They are glabrous, except for a few long setae on the head, pronotum and elytra.

== Etymology ==
The species is named after its collector, Jia-Yao Hu.
