= Maladera hunuguensis =

Scientific classification
- Kingdom: Animalia
- Phylum: Arthropoda
- Class: Insecta
- Order: Coleoptera
- Suborder: Polyphaga
- Infraorder: Scarabaeiformia
- Family: Scarabaeidae
- Genus: Maladera
- Species: M. hunuguensis

Binomial name
- Maladera hunuguensis Ahrens, Fabrizi & Liu, 2021

Species of beetle

Maladera hunuguensis is a species of beetle of the family Scarabaeidae. It is found in China (Guangdong, Hunan).

== Description ==
Adults reach a length of about 9.7–11.2 mm. They have a reddish brown, wide, oval body. The antennae are yellowish brown and the dorsal surface is dull (but the labroclypeus, tarsomeres and tibiae are shiny) and glabrous.

== Etymology ==
The species name refers to its type locality, Hunugu.
