= Maladera krombeini =

Scientific classification
- Kingdom: Animalia
- Phylum: Arthropoda
- Class: Insecta
- Order: Coleoptera
- Suborder: Polyphaga
- Infraorder: Scarabaeiformia
- Family: Scarabaeidae
- Genus: Maladera
- Species: M. krombeini

Binomial name
- Maladera krombeini Fabrizi & Ahrens, 2014

Species of beetle

Maladera krombeini is a species of beetle of the family Scarabaeidae. It is found in Sri Lanka.

== Description ==
Adults reach a length of about 6.8-7.4 mm. They have a yellowish brown, oblong-oval body. The dorsal surface is dull and glabrous, except for a few small setae on the head and the lateral margins of the pronotum and elytra.

== Etymology ==
The species is named after K.V. Krombein, one of the collectors in the Sri Lanka project of the Smithsonian Institution.
