= Maladera liwenzhui =

Scientific classification
- Kingdom: Animalia
- Phylum: Arthropoda
- Class: Insecta
- Order: Coleoptera
- Suborder: Polyphaga
- Infraorder: Scarabaeiformia
- Family: Scarabaeidae
- Genus: Maladera
- Species: M. liwenzhui

Binomial name
- Maladera liwenzhui Ahrens, Fabrizi & Liu, 2021

Species of beetle

Maladera liwenzhui is a species of beetle of the family Scarabaeidae. It is found in China (Guangxi).

== Description ==
Adults reach a length of about 11.2–11.3 mm. They have a dark brown, wide, oval body. The antennae are yellowish brown. The dorsal surface is dull (but the labroclypeus, tarsomeres and tibiae are shiny) and glabrous.

== Etymology ==
The species is named after the Chinese entomologist Li Wenzhu.
