= Maladera tricuspidata =

Scientific classification
- Kingdom: Animalia
- Phylum: Arthropoda
- Class: Insecta
- Order: Coleoptera
- Suborder: Polyphaga
- Infraorder: Scarabaeiformia
- Family: Scarabaeidae
- Genus: Maladera
- Species: M. tricuspidata

Binomial name
- Maladera tricuspidata Fabrizi & Ahrens, 2014

Species of beetle

Maladera tricuspidata is a species of beetle of the family Scarabaeidae. It is found in Sri Lanka.

== Description ==
Adults reach a length of about 7.1–8.4 mm. They have a reddish brown, short oval body, with yellow antennae. The dorsal surface is shiny and densely finely setose.

== Etymology ==
The name of the species is derived from Latin tri (meaning three) and cuspidatus (meaning sharply pointed) and refers to the particular shape of the aedeagus.
