= Maladera habashanensis =

Scientific classification
- Kingdom: Animalia
- Phylum: Arthropoda
- Class: Insecta
- Order: Coleoptera
- Suborder: Polyphaga
- Infraorder: Scarabaeiformia
- Family: Scarabaeidae
- Genus: Maladera
- Species: M. habashanensis

Binomial name
- Maladera habashanensis Ahrens, Fabrizi & Liu, 2021

Species of beetle

Maladera habashanensis is a species of beetle of the family Scarabaeidae. It is found in China (Yunnan).

== Description ==
Adults reach a length of about 7.6–8.4 mm. They have a reddish brown, oblong-oval body. The antennae are yellow. They are mostly dull (while the labroclypeus is shiny) and the dorsal surface is nearly glabrous (except for some single setae on the head).

== Etymology ==
The species name refers to its occurrence in the Habashan mountains.
