= Maladera shiniushanensis =

Scientific classification
- Kingdom: Animalia
- Phylum: Arthropoda
- Class: Insecta
- Order: Coleoptera
- Suborder: Polyphaga
- Infraorder: Scarabaeiformia
- Family: Scarabaeidae
- Genus: Maladera
- Species: M. shiniushanensis

Binomial name
- Maladera shiniushanensis Ahrens, Fabrizi & Liu, 2021

Species of beetle

Maladera shiniushanensis is a species of beetle of the family Scarabaeidae. It is found in China (Fujian).

== Description ==
Adults reach a length of about 8.8–9.5 mm. They have a dark brown, oval body. The antennae are yellow. The labroclypeus is shiny, but the remainder of the dorsal surface is dull and glabrous, except for a few small setae on the head and elytra.

== Etymology ==
The species is named after its type locality, Shiniu shan.
