= Maladera champhaiensis =

Scientific classification
- Kingdom: Animalia
- Phylum: Arthropoda
- Class: Insecta
- Order: Coleoptera
- Suborder: Polyphaga
- Infraorder: Scarabaeiformia
- Family: Scarabaeidae
- Genus: Maladera
- Species: M. champhaiensis

Binomial name
- Maladera champhaiensis Gupta, Bhunia, Ahrens & Chandra, 2025

Species of beetle

Maladera champhaiensis is a species of beetle of the family Scarabaeidae. It is found in India (Mizoram).

== Description ==
Adults reach a length of about 10.1 mm. They have an uniformly dark brown, oval body. The dorsal and ventral surface are dull, while the head and anterior pronotum are moderately shiny. They are nearly glabrous, except for the lateral setae of the elytra and pronotum.

== Etymology ==
The species is named after its type locality.
