= Maladera longruiensis =

Scientific classification
- Kingdom: Animalia
- Phylum: Arthropoda
- Class: Insecta
- Order: Coleoptera
- Suborder: Polyphaga
- Infraorder: Scarabaeiformia
- Family: Scarabaeidae
- Genus: Maladera
- Species: M. longruiensis

Binomial name
- Maladera longruiensis Ahrens, Fabrizi & Liu, 2021

Species of beetle

Maladera longruiensis is a species of beetle of the family Scarabaeidae. It is found in China (Guangxi), Myanmar and Thailand.

== Description ==
Adults reach a length of about 5.9–6.9 mm. They have a dark reddish brown to blackish, oval body. The antennae are yellow, with the antennal club brown. The dorsal surface is dull and, except for some single setae on the head, nearly glabrous.

== Etymology ==
The species name refers to its type locality, Longrui.
