= Maladera ostentatrix =

Scientific classification
- Kingdom: Animalia
- Phylum: Arthropoda
- Class: Insecta
- Order: Coleoptera
- Suborder: Polyphaga
- Infraorder: Scarabaeiformia
- Family: Scarabaeidae
- Genus: Maladera
- Species: M. ostentatrix

Binomial name
- Maladera ostentatrix (Brenske, 1899)

Synonyms
- Autoserica ostentatrix Brenske, 1899

Species of beetle

Maladera ostentatrix is a species of beetle of the family Scarabaeidae. It is found in Indonesia (Java).

== Description ==
Adults reach a length of about 12 mm. They are broadly ovate, dull but not densely tomentose, and weakly opalescent. They are reddish-brown underneath, with the tibiae and tarsi shiny, and dark above with a slight metallic silky tinge, which is olive-greenish on the elytra.
