= Maladera shoumanensis =

Scientific classification
- Kingdom: Animalia
- Phylum: Arthropoda
- Class: Insecta
- Order: Coleoptera
- Suborder: Polyphaga
- Infraorder: Scarabaeiformia
- Family: Scarabaeidae
- Genus: Maladera
- Species: M. shoumanensis

Binomial name
- Maladera shoumanensis Ahrens, Fabrizi & Liu, 2021

Species of beetle

Maladera shoumanensis is a species of beetle of the family Scarabaeidae. It is found in China (Shaanxi).

== Description ==
Adults reach a length of about 8.1–9.4 mm (0.32–0.37 in). They have a dark brown, oval body. The legs are brown and the antennae are yellow. They are dull (but the head, tarsomeres, and tibiae are shiny) and glabrous.

== Etymology ==
The species name is derived from its type locality, Shou Man village.
