= Maladera sprecherae =

Scientific classification
- Kingdom: Animalia
- Phylum: Arthropoda
- Class: Insecta
- Order: Coleoptera
- Suborder: Polyphaga
- Infraorder: Scarabaeiformia
- Family: Scarabaeidae
- Genus: Maladera
- Species: M. sprecherae

Binomial name
- Maladera sprecherae Ahrens, 2004

Species of beetle

Maladera sprecherae is a species of beetle of the family Scarabaeidae. It is found in India (Arunachal Pradesh, West Bengal) and Bhutan.

== Description ==
Adults reach a length of about 7.4–8.1 mm. They have a dark reddish brown, oval body. The upper surface is mostly dull and glabrous, except for a few setae on the head and the lateral cilia of the pronotum and elytra.

== Etymology ==
The species is named for Eva Sprecher-Uebersax, who assisted the author.
