= Maladera stipidosa =

Scientific classification
- Kingdom: Animalia
- Phylum: Arthropoda
- Class: Insecta
- Order: Coleoptera
- Suborder: Polyphaga
- Infraorder: Scarabaeiformia
- Family: Scarabaeidae
- Genus: Maladera
- Species: M. stipidosa

Binomial name
- Maladera stipidosa (Brenske, 1899)

Synonyms
- Autoserica stipidosa Brenske, 1899

Species of beetle

Maladera stipidosa is a species of beetle of the family Scarabaeidae. It is found on Borneo.

== Description ==
Adults reach a length of about 8.2 mm. They are slightly dull, blackish-brown and opalescent with a somewhat glossy pronotum and pygidium and strongly glossy legs. The elytra are punctate in rows, with the intervals slightly raised and coarsely and fairly evenly punctate. The first interval is the widest.
