= Maladera dadongshanica =

Scientific classification
- Kingdom: Animalia
- Phylum: Arthropoda
- Class: Insecta
- Order: Coleoptera
- Suborder: Polyphaga
- Infraorder: Scarabaeiformia
- Family: Scarabaeidae
- Genus: Maladera
- Species: M. dadongshanica

Binomial name
- Maladera dadongshanica Ahrens, Fabrizi & Liu, 2021

Species of beetle

Maladera dadongshanica is a species of beetle of the family Scarabaeidae. It is found in China (Guangdong, Zhejiang).

== Description ==
Adults reach a length of about 9.1–9.4 mm. They have a dark reddish brown, oval body. The antennae are yellow. The labroclypeus is weakly shiny, while the remainder of the dorsal surface is dull and glabrous.

== Etymology ==
The species is named after its type locality, the Dadongshan mountains.
