= Maladera kottagudiensis =

Scientific classification
- Kingdom: Animalia
- Phylum: Arthropoda
- Class: Insecta
- Order: Coleoptera
- Suborder: Polyphaga
- Infraorder: Scarabaeiformia
- Family: Scarabaeidae
- Genus: Maladera
- Species: M. kottagudiensis

Binomial name
- Maladera kottagudiensis Chandra, Ahrens, Bhunia, Sreedevi & Gupta, 2021

Species of beetle

Maladera kottagudiensis is a species of beetle of the family Scarabaeidae. It is found in India (Tamil Nadu).

== Description ==
Adults reach a length of about 10.2 mm. They have an uniformly reddish-brown, oval body. The dorsal surface is dull and, except for the lateral setae of the elytra and pronotum, nearly glabrous.

== Etymology ==
The species is named after the type locality, Kottagudi.
