= Maladera spissigrada =

Scientific classification
- Kingdom: Animalia
- Phylum: Arthropoda
- Class: Insecta
- Order: Coleoptera
- Suborder: Polyphaga
- Infraorder: Scarabaeiformia
- Family: Scarabaeidae
- Genus: Maladera
- Species: M. spissigrada

Binomial name
- Maladera spissigrada (Brenske, 1897)

Synonyms
- Serica spissigrada Brenske, 1898; Maladera kurentzovi Kalinina, 1978; Serica nakayamai Murayama, 1938

Species of beetle

Maladera spissigrada is a species of beetle of the family Scarabaeidae. It is found in China (Heilongjiang, Jilin, Liaoning), Japan and the Russian Far East.

== Description ==
Adults reach a length of about 7.4 mm. They have an oblong blackish brown body. The antennae are yellowish and the surface is dull.
