= Maladera tridentata =

Scientific classification
- Kingdom: Animalia
- Phylum: Arthropoda
- Clade: Pancrustacea
- Class: Insecta
- Order: Coleoptera
- Suborder: Polyphaga
- Infraorder: Scarabaeiformia
- Family: Scarabaeidae
- Genus: Maladera
- Species: M. tridentata

Binomial name
- Maladera tridentata (Moser, 1918)

Synonyms
- Autoserica tridentata Moser, 1918

Species of beetle

Maladera tridentata is a species of beetle of the family Scarabaeidae. It is found in Laos.

== Description ==
Adults reach a length of about 11 mm. They are dull, blackish-brown above and brown below. The frons is dull. The pronotum has setate lateral margins and the surface is densely and finely punctate. The elytra are striated, with the intervals densely covered with fine punctures. The lateral margins of the elytra are setate.
