= Maladera snizeki =

Scientific classification
- Kingdom: Animalia
- Phylum: Arthropoda
- Class: Insecta
- Order: Coleoptera
- Suborder: Polyphaga
- Infraorder: Scarabaeiformia
- Family: Scarabaeidae
- Genus: Maladera
- Species: M. snizeki

Binomial name
- Maladera snizeki Ahrens, Fabrizi & Liu, 2021

Species of beetle

Maladera snizeki is a species of beetle of the family Scarabaeidae. It is found in Thailand and China (Yunnan).

== Description ==
Adults reach a length of about 4.9–5.4 mm. They have a yellowish brown, oval body. The head is dark brown, partly with a greenish shine, and the antennae are yellow. The dorsal surface is dull and, except for some single setae on the head, nearly glabrous.

== Etymology ==
The species is named after one of its collectors, M. Snizek.
