= Maladera haba =

Scientific classification
- Kingdom: Animalia
- Phylum: Arthropoda
- Class: Insecta
- Order: Coleoptera
- Suborder: Polyphaga
- Infraorder: Scarabaeiformia
- Family: Scarabaeidae
- Genus: Maladera
- Species: M. haba

Binomial name
- Maladera haba Ahrens, Fabrizi & Liu, 2021

Species of beetle

Maladera haba is a species of beetle of the family Scarabaeidae. It is found in China (Yunnan).

== Description ==
Adults reach a length of about 5–5.5 mm. They have an elongate body. The dorsal and ventral surface (including legs and antennae) are yellow. The elytra are shiny, and the head, scutellum and pronotum are moderately shiny. Except for some single setae on the head, the dorsal surface is nearly glabrous.

== Etymology ==
The species name refers to its type locality, Haba.
