= Maladera dajuensis =

Scientific classification
- Kingdom: Animalia
- Phylum: Arthropoda
- Class: Insecta
- Order: Coleoptera
- Suborder: Polyphaga
- Infraorder: Scarabaeiformia
- Family: Scarabaeidae
- Genus: Maladera
- Species: M. dajuensis

Binomial name
- Maladera dajuensis Ahrens, Fabrizi & Liu, 2021

Species of beetle

Maladera dajuensis is a species of beetle of the family Scarabaeidae. It is found in China (Yunnan).

== Description ==
Adults reach a length of about 5.5–6.7 mm. They have an elongate body. The dorsal and ventral surface (including legs and antennae) are yellow. The elytra are shiny, and the head, scutellum and pronotum are moderately shiny. The body is shortly and densely setose.

== Etymology ==
The species name refers to its type locality, Daju.
