= Maladera euphorbiae =

Scientific classification
- Kingdom: Animalia
- Phylum: Arthropoda
- Class: Insecta
- Order: Coleoptera
- Suborder: Polyphaga
- Infraorder: Scarabaeiformia
- Family: Scarabaeidae
- Genus: Maladera
- Species: M. euphorbiae

Binomial name
- Maladera euphorbiae (Burmeister, 1855)

Synonyms
- Serica euphorbiae Burmeister, 1855; Serica fusca Ballion, 1871

Species of beetle

Maladera euphorbiae is a species of beetle of the family Scarabaeidae. It is found in Afghanistan, China (Xinjiang), Kazakhstan, Tajikistan, Turkmenistan and Uzbekistan.

== Description ==
Adults reach a length of about 7.5 mm. They have a wide, oval, yellowish brown body. The dorsal surface is dull.
