= Maladera globosa =

Scientific classification
- Kingdom: Animalia
- Phylum: Arthropoda
- Class: Insecta
- Order: Coleoptera
- Suborder: Polyphaga
- Infraorder: Scarabaeiformia
- Family: Scarabaeidae
- Genus: Maladera
- Species: M. globosa

Binomial name
- Maladera globosa (Frey, 1972)

Synonyms
- Cephaloserica globosa Frey, 1972

Species of beetle

Maladera globosa is a species of beetle of the family Scarabaeidae. It is found in Vietnam.

== Description ==
Adults reach a length of about 5 mm. The upper and lower surfaces are blackish-brown and faintly glossy, sometimes slightly iridescent. The anterior margin, lateral margins of the pronotum and elytra, as well as the tip of the pygidium are sparsely fringed with pale setae. The rest of the upper surface is glabrous.
