= Maladera magnicornis =

Scientific classification
- Kingdom: Animalia
- Phylum: Arthropoda
- Clade: Pancrustacea
- Class: Insecta
- Order: Coleoptera
- Suborder: Polyphaga
- Infraorder: Scarabaeiformia
- Family: Scarabaeidae
- Genus: Maladera
- Species: M. magnicornis

Binomial name
- Maladera magnicornis (Moser, 1920)

Synonyms
- Autoserica magnicornis Moser, 1920

Species of beetle

Maladera magnicornis is a species of beetle of the family Scarabaeidae. It is found in India (Karnataka).

== Description ==
Adults reach a length of about 8.2 mm. They have an oblong-oval body. The dorsal surface is dark brown, with yellowish antennae. The ventral surface is dark reddish brown. The dorsal surface is dull and nearly glabrous, except for some setae on the head.
