= Maladera pieli =

Scientific classification
- Kingdom: Animalia
- Phylum: Arthropoda
- Class: Insecta
- Order: Coleoptera
- Suborder: Polyphaga
- Infraorder: Scarabaeiformia
- Family: Scarabaeidae
- Genus: Maladera
- Species: M. pieli

Binomial name
- Maladera pieli Ahrens, Fabrizi & Liu, 2021

Species of beetle

Maladera pieli is a species of beetle of the family Scarabaeidae. It is found in China (Zhejiang).

== Description ==
Adults reach a length of about 9.5 mm. They have a dark reddish brown, elongate body. The dorsal surface is dull (but the labroclypeus, tibiae and tarsi are shiny) and nearly glabrous, except for the lateral setae of the pronotum and elytra and a few setae on the head.

== Etymology ==
The species is named after its collector, O. Piel.
