= Maladera subaana =

Scientific classification
- Kingdom: Animalia
- Phylum: Arthropoda
- Clade: Pancrustacea
- Class: Insecta
- Order: Coleoptera
- Suborder: Polyphaga
- Infraorder: Scarabaeiformia
- Family: Scarabaeidae
- Genus: Maladera
- Species: M. subaana

Binomial name
- Maladera subaana (Moser, 1922)

Synonyms
- Autoserica subaana Moser, 1922

Species of beetle

Maladera subaana is a species of beetle of the family Scarabaeidae. It is found in the Philippines (Mindoro).

== Description ==
Adults reach a length of about 5 mm. They are rufous and opaque. The head is sparsely punctate and the antennae are reddish-yellow. The pronotum is quite sparsely punctate and the elytra are slightly sulcate, and quite sparsely punctate, with very minute setose punctures.
