= Maladera tiammushanica =

Scientific classification
- Kingdom: Animalia
- Phylum: Arthropoda
- Class: Insecta
- Order: Coleoptera
- Suborder: Polyphaga
- Infraorder: Scarabaeiformia
- Family: Scarabaeidae
- Genus: Maladera
- Species: M. tiammushanica

Binomial name
- Maladera tiammushanica Ahrens, Fabrizi & Liu, 2021

Species of beetle

Maladera tiammushanica is a species of beetle of the family Scarabaeidae. It is found in China (Anhui, Zhejiang).

== Description ==
Adults reach a length of about 8.4–9.7 mm. They have a dark reddish brown, oval body. The antennae are yellow. The labroclypeus is weakly shiny, while the remainder of the dorsal surface is dull and glabrous.

== Etymology ==
The species is named after its type locality, Tiammu Shan.
