= Maladera bubengensis =

Scientific classification
- Kingdom: Animalia
- Phylum: Arthropoda
- Class: Insecta
- Order: Coleoptera
- Suborder: Polyphaga
- Infraorder: Scarabaeiformia
- Family: Scarabaeidae
- Genus: Maladera
- Species: M. bubengensis

Binomial name
- Maladera bubengensis Ahrens, Fabrizi & Liu, 2021

Species of beetle

Maladera bubengensis is a species of beetle of the family Scarabaeidae. It is found in China (Yunnan).

== Description ==
Adults reach a length of about 10.4 mm. They have a dark brown, oval body. The antennae are yellow. The labroclypeus is shiny, but the remainder of the dorsal surface is dull with some iridescent greenish shine and glabrous, except for a few short setae on the head.

== Etymology ==
The species is named after its type locality, Bubeng.
