= Maladera jinggangshanica =

Scientific classification
- Kingdom: Animalia
- Phylum: Arthropoda
- Class: Insecta
- Order: Coleoptera
- Suborder: Polyphaga
- Infraorder: Scarabaeiformia
- Family: Scarabaeidae
- Genus: Maladera
- Species: M. jinggangshanica

Binomial name
- Maladera jinggangshanica Ahrens, Fabrizi & Liu, 2021

Species of beetle

Maladera jinggangshanica is a species of beetle of the family Scarabaeidae. It is found in China (Jiangxi).

== Description ==
Adults reach a length of about 8.7 mm. They have a reddish brown, oval body, with yellowish antennae. The dorsal surface is dull (but the labroclypeus is shiny) and there are several short setae on the head and elytra.

== Etymology ==
The species is named after its type locality, the Jinggangshan mountains.
