= Maladera fangana =

Scientific classification
- Kingdom: Animalia
- Phylum: Arthropoda
- Class: Insecta
- Order: Coleoptera
- Suborder: Polyphaga
- Infraorder: Scarabaeiformia
- Family: Scarabaeidae
- Genus: Maladera
- Species: M. fangana

Binomial name
- Maladera fangana Ahrens, Fabrizi & Liu, 2021

Species of beetle

Maladera fangana is a species of beetle of the family Scarabaeidae. It is found in Laos, Thailand and China (Yunnan).

== Description ==
Adults reach a length of about 4.4–5.6 mm. They have a black, oval body. The club of the antennae is dark brown and parts of the pronotum and head have a greenish shine. The dorsal surface is dull and, except for some single setae on the head, nearly glabrous.

== Etymology ==
The species is named after one of its type locality, Fang.
