= Maladera sauteri =

Scientific classification
- Kingdom: Animalia
- Phylum: Arthropoda
- Clade: Pancrustacea
- Class: Insecta
- Order: Coleoptera
- Suborder: Polyphaga
- Infraorder: Scarabaeiformia
- Family: Scarabaeidae
- Genus: Maladera
- Species: M. sauteri

Binomial name
- Maladera sauteri (Moser, 1918)

Synonyms
- Autoserica sauteri Moser, 1918

Species of beetle

Maladera sauteri is a species of beetle of the family Scarabaeidae. It is found in Taiwan.

== Description ==
Adults reach a length of about 11 mm. They are dull, blackish-brown above and brown below. The head is weakly punctate and the antennae are yellowish-brown. The surface of the pronotum is finely punctate and the elytra have rows of punctures, with the interstices moderately densely punctate.
