= Maladera breviata =

Scientific classification
- Kingdom: Animalia
- Phylum: Arthropoda
- Class: Insecta
- Order: Coleoptera
- Suborder: Polyphaga
- Infraorder: Scarabaeiformia
- Family: Scarabaeidae
- Genus: Maladera
- Species: M. breviata

Binomial name
- Maladera breviata (Brenske, 1898)

Synonyms
- Autoserica breviata Brenske, 1898; Serica atrata Burmeister, 1855 (nec Reiche, 1847); Autoserica atratula Dalla Torre, 1912

Species of beetle

Maladera breviata is a species of beetle of the family Scarabaeidae. It is found in India and Sri Lanka.

== Description ==
Adults reach a length of about 7.7-8.4 mm. They have an oval black body, sometimes partly dark brown or with a dull greenish tinge. The antennae are yellow.
