= Maladera schintlmeisteri =

Scientific classification
- Kingdom: Animalia
- Phylum: Arthropoda
- Class: Insecta
- Order: Coleoptera
- Suborder: Polyphaga
- Infraorder: Scarabaeiformia
- Family: Scarabaeidae
- Genus: Maladera
- Species: M. schintlmeisteri

Binomial name
- Maladera schintlmeisteri Fabrizi & Ahrens, 2014

Species of beetle

Maladera schintlmeisteri is a species of beetle of the family Scarabaeidae. It is found in Sri Lanka.

== Description ==
Adults reach a length of about 11.5-12.4 mm. They have a dark brown, oval body, with dark yellowish antennae. The dorsal surface is dull, with fine, sparse erect setae on the head and pronotum.

== Etymology ==
The species is named after one of its collectors, Alexander Schintlmeister.
