= Maladera enigma =

Scientific classification
- Kingdom: Animalia
- Phylum: Arthropoda
- Class: Insecta
- Order: Coleoptera
- Suborder: Polyphaga
- Infraorder: Scarabaeiformia
- Family: Scarabaeidae
- Genus: Maladera
- Species: M. enigma

Binomial name
- Maladera enigma Ahrens, Fabrizi & Liu, 2021

Species of beetle

Maladera enigma is a species of beetle of the family Scarabaeidae. It is found in China (Jiangxi).

== Description ==
Adults reach a length of about 9.4 mm. They have a dark brown, oval body. The antennae are yellow. The dorsal surface is glabrous and mostly dull, although th labroclypeus, tarsomeres, and tibiae are shiny.

== Etymology ==
The species name is derived from Greek enigma and refers to the uncertain systematic position of the species.
