= Maladera fuanensis =

Scientific classification
- Kingdom: Animalia
- Phylum: Arthropoda
- Class: Insecta
- Order: Coleoptera
- Suborder: Polyphaga
- Infraorder: Scarabaeiformia
- Family: Scarabaeidae
- Genus: Maladera
- Species: M. fuanensis

Binomial name
- Maladera fuanensis Ahrens, Fabrizi & Liu, 2021

Species of beetle

Maladera fuanensis is a species of beetle of the family Scarabaeidae. It is found in China (Fujian).

== Description ==
Adults reach a length of about 8.4 mm. They have a light reddish brown, oval body. The antennae are yellow. The labroclypeus is shiny, but the remainder of the dorsal surface is dull and, except for a few small setae on the head and elytra, glabrous.

== Etymology ==
The species name refers to its type locality, Fu’an.
