= Maladera judithae =

Scientific classification
- Kingdom: Animalia
- Phylum: Arthropoda
- Class: Insecta
- Order: Coleoptera
- Suborder: Polyphaga
- Infraorder: Scarabaeiformia
- Family: Scarabaeidae
- Genus: Maladera
- Species: M. judithae

Binomial name
- Maladera judithae Sreedevi & Ahrens, 2025

Species of beetle

Maladera judithae is a species of beetle of the family Scarabaeidae. It is found in India (Kerala).

== Description ==
Adults reach a length of about 9.3 mm. They have an oval body. The dorsal and ventral surface are reddish brown and dull, partly with an iridescent shine. The antennae are yellowish. The dorsal surface is nearly glabrous, except for some single setae on the head.

== Etymology ==
The species is named after the collector of the species, Ms. Judith Corolin Correya.
