= Maladera paralatitibia =

Scientific classification
- Kingdom: Animalia
- Phylum: Arthropoda
- Class: Insecta
- Order: Coleoptera
- Suborder: Polyphaga
- Infraorder: Scarabaeiformia
- Family: Scarabaeidae
- Genus: Maladera
- Species: M. paralatitibia

Binomial name
- Maladera paralatitibia (Ahrens, 2002)

Synonyms
- Eumaladera paralatitibia Ahrens, 2002

Species of beetle

Maladera paralatitibia is a species of beetle of the family Scarabaeidae. It is found in Taiwan.

== Description ==
Adults reach a length of about 6.3-6.6 mm. They have a reddish brown, oblong body. The antennae are yellow and the dorsal surface (except for the legs, head and anterior pronotum) is dull and glabrous, except for a few hairs on the head and elytra.
