= Maladera rugosa =

Scientific classification
- Kingdom: Animalia
- Phylum: Arthropoda
- Clade: Pancrustacea
- Class: Insecta
- Order: Coleoptera
- Suborder: Polyphaga
- Infraorder: Scarabaeiformia
- Family: Scarabaeidae
- Genus: Maladera
- Species: M. rugosa

Binomial name
- Maladera rugosa (Blanchard, 1850)

Synonyms
- Omaloplia rugosa Blanchard, 1850; Maladera (Aserica) graeca Petrovitz, 1969

Species of beetle

Maladera rugosa is a species of beetle of the family Scarabaeidae. It is found in Greece.

== Description ==
Adults reach a length of about 9.5-10.8 mm. They have a black, oval, not very shiny body, with a strong metallic sheen. The antennae and the setae of the underside are reddish-brown.
