= Maladera tianzhushanica =

Scientific classification
- Kingdom: Animalia
- Phylum: Arthropoda
- Class: Insecta
- Order: Coleoptera
- Suborder: Polyphaga
- Infraorder: Scarabaeiformia
- Family: Scarabaeidae
- Genus: Maladera
- Species: M. tianzhushanica

Binomial name
- Maladera tianzhushanica Ahrens, Fabrizi & Liu, 2021

Species of beetle

Maladera tianzhushanica is a species of beetle of the family Scarabaeidae. It is found in China (Anhui).

== Description ==
Adults reach a length of about 9.1 mm. They have a dark brown, oblong-oval body. The antennae are yellow. The labroclypeus is weakly shiny, but the remainder of the dorsal surface is dull and glabrous.

== Etymology ==
The species name refers to its type locality, Tianzhushan.
