= Maladera tripuraensis =

Scientific classification
- Kingdom: Animalia
- Phylum: Arthropoda
- Class: Insecta
- Order: Coleoptera
- Suborder: Polyphaga
- Infraorder: Scarabaeiformia
- Family: Scarabaeidae
- Genus: Maladera
- Species: M. tripuraensis

Binomial name
- Maladera tripuraensis Chandra, Ahrens, Bhunia, Sreedevi & Gupta, 2021

Species of beetle

Maladera tripuraensis is a species of beetle of the family Scarabaeidae. It is found in India (Tripura).

== Description ==
Adults reach a length of about 11.8 mm. They have a black, wide, oval body. The dorsal surface is glabrous and mostly dull, although the labroclypeus, tarsomeres, and tibiae are shiny.

== Etymology ==
The species is named after its occurrence in Tripura.
