= Maladera cinnaberina =

Scientific classification
- Kingdom: Animalia
- Phylum: Arthropoda
- Class: Insecta
- Order: Coleoptera
- Suborder: Polyphaga
- Infraorder: Scarabaeiformia
- Family: Scarabaeidae
- Genus: Maladera
- Species: M. cinnaberina

Binomial name
- Maladera cinnaberina (Brenske, 1898)

Synonyms
- Autoserica cinnaberina Brenske, 1898

Species of beetle

Maladera cinnaberina is a species of beetle of the family Scarabaeidae. It is found in Sri Lanka.

== Description ==
Adults reach a length of about 10.3-10.4 mm. They have a light reddish brown, oblong-oval body. The antennae are yellow. The dorsal surface is dull and glabrous, except for a few small setae on the head and the lateral margins of the pronotum and elytra.
