= Maladera jingdongensis =

Scientific classification
- Kingdom: Animalia
- Phylum: Arthropoda
- Class: Insecta
- Order: Coleoptera
- Suborder: Polyphaga
- Infraorder: Scarabaeiformia
- Family: Scarabaeidae
- Genus: Maladera
- Species: M. jingdongensis

Binomial name
- Maladera jingdongensis Ahrens, Fabrizi & Liu, 2021

Species of beetle

Maladera jingdongensis is a species of beetle of the family Scarabaeidae. It is found in China (Yunnan).

== Description ==
Adults reach a length of about 6.3 mm. They have an oblong-oval body. The dorsal surface is dark reddish brown and dull. The antennae are yellow. Except for some single setae on the head, the dorsal surface is nearly glabrous.

== Etymology ==
The species name refers to its type locality, Jingdong.
