= Maladera nilgirina =

Scientific classification
- Kingdom: Animalia
- Phylum: Arthropoda
- Class: Insecta
- Order: Coleoptera
- Suborder: Polyphaga
- Infraorder: Scarabaeiformia
- Family: Scarabaeidae
- Genus: Maladera
- Species: M. nilgirina

Binomial name
- Maladera nilgirina (Frey, 1972)

Synonyms
- Autoserica nilgirina Frey, 1972

Species of beetle

Maladera nilgirina is a species of beetle of the family Scarabaeidae. It is found in India (Kerala, Tamil Nadu).

== Description ==
Adults reach a length of about 7.7 mm. They have a reddish brown, oblong-oval body, with the elytra slightly lighter and the antennae yellowish. The dorsal surface is mostly dull and glabrous, except for a few short setae on the sides of the elytra.
