= Maladera aptera =

Scientific classification
- Kingdom: Animalia
- Phylum: Arthropoda
- Class: Insecta
- Order: Coleoptera
- Suborder: Polyphaga
- Infraorder: Scarabaeiformia
- Family: Scarabaeidae
- Genus: Maladera
- Species: M. aptera

Binomial name
- Maladera aptera Ahrens, Fabrizi & Liu, 2021

Species of beetle

Maladera aptera is a species of beetle of the family Scarabaeidae. It is found in China (Yunnan).

== Description ==
Adults reach a length of about 9.6–10.6 mm. They have a black, egg-shaped body. They are shiny, and nearly glabrous, except for the lateral setae of the pronotum and elytra and a few setae on the head.

== Etymology ==
The species name is derived from Latin apterus (meaning without wings) and refers to the lacking wings in this species.
