= Maladera baii =

Scientific classification
- Kingdom: Animalia
- Phylum: Arthropoda
- Class: Insecta
- Order: Coleoptera
- Suborder: Polyphaga
- Infraorder: Scarabaeiformia
- Family: Scarabaeidae
- Genus: Maladera
- Species: M. baii

Binomial name
- Maladera baii Ahrens, Fabrizi & Liu, 2021

Species of beetle

Maladera baii is a species of beetle of the family Scarabaeidae. It is found in China (Fujian).

== Description ==
Adults reach a length of about 9.4–10.3 mm. They have a dark brown, oblong-oval body. The antennae are yellow. The labroclypeus is weakly shiny, but the remainder of the dorsal surface is dull and, except for a few long setae on the elytra, glabrous.

== Etymology ==
The species is dedicated to Dr. Ming Bai.
