= Maladera inermis =

Scientific classification
- Kingdom: Animalia
- Phylum: Arthropoda
- Class: Insecta
- Order: Coleoptera
- Suborder: Polyphaga
- Infraorder: Scarabaeiformia
- Family: Scarabaeidae
- Genus: Maladera
- Species: M. inermis

Binomial name
- Maladera inermis (Brenske, 1899)

Synonyms
- Autoserica inermis Brenske, 1899; Autoserica rufa Moser, 1916; Autoserica warriana Brenske, 1902

Species of beetle

Maladera inermis is a species of beetle of the family Scarabaeidae. It is found in India (Assam).

== Description ==
Adults reach a length of about 8.1 mm. They have a reddish-brown, oval body. The upper surface is mostly dull and glabrous, except for some setae on the head and the lateral cilia of the pronotum and elytra.
