= Maladera lumlaensis =

Scientific classification
- Kingdom: Animalia
- Phylum: Arthropoda
- Class: Insecta
- Order: Coleoptera
- Suborder: Polyphaga
- Infraorder: Scarabaeiformia
- Family: Scarabaeidae
- Genus: Maladera
- Species: M. lumlaensis

Binomial name
- Maladera lumlaensis Gupta, Bhunia, Ahrens & Chandra, 2025

Species of beetle

Maladera lumlaensis is a species of beetle of the family Scarabaeidae. It is found in India (Arunachal Pradesh).

== Description ==
Adults reach a length of about 11.5 mm. They have a dark reddish brown, oval body. They are mostly dull (but the labroclypeus is shiny) and, except for some single setae on the head dorsal surface, nearly glabrous.

== Etymology ==
The species is named after its type locality.
