= Maladera taiyangheensis =

Scientific classification
- Kingdom: Animalia
- Phylum: Arthropoda
- Class: Insecta
- Order: Coleoptera
- Suborder: Polyphaga
- Infraorder: Scarabaeiformia
- Family: Scarabaeidae
- Genus: Maladera
- Species: M. taiyangheensis

Binomial name
- Maladera taiyangheensis Ahrens, Fabrizi & Liu, 2021

Species of beetle

Maladera taiyangheensis is a species of beetle of the family Scarabaeidae. It is found in China (Chongqing, Hubei).

== Description ==
Adults reach a length of about 10.9–13.9 mm. They have a reddish brown, oval body. The antennae are yellow. The dorsal surface is dull and, except for a few small setae on the head, glabrous.

== Etymology ==
The species name refers to its occurrence close to Tengchong.
