= Maladera westermanni =

Scientific classification
- Kingdom: Animalia
- Phylum: Arthropoda
- Class: Insecta
- Order: Coleoptera
- Suborder: Polyphaga
- Infraorder: Scarabaeiformia
- Family: Scarabaeidae
- Genus: Maladera
- Species: M. westermanni

Binomial name
- Maladera westermanni (Brenske, 1898)

Synonyms
- Serica westermanni Brenske, 1898

Species of beetle

Maladera westermanni is a species of beetle of the family Scarabaeidae. It is found in Sri Lanka and southern India.

== Description ==
Adults reach a length of about 6.5-7.8 mm. They have a light reddish brown, oblong-oval body. The elytra and antennae are yellowish brown. The dorsal surface is dull and glabrous, except for a few small setae on the head and the lateral margins of the pronotum and elytra.
