= Maladera beibengensis =

Scientific classification
- Kingdom: Animalia
- Phylum: Arthropoda
- Class: Insecta
- Order: Coleoptera
- Suborder: Polyphaga
- Infraorder: Scarabaeiformia
- Family: Scarabaeidae
- Genus: Maladera
- Species: M. beibengensis

Binomial name
- Maladera beibengensis Ahrens, Fabrizi & Liu, 2021

Species of beetle

Maladera beibengensis is a species of beetle of the family Scarabaeidae. It is found in China (Xizang).

== Description ==
Adults reach a length of about 8.9 mm. They have a dark brown, oval body. The antennae are yellow. The dorsal surface is dull (except for the shiny anterior head and tibiae) and (except for a few small setae on the head and elytra) glabrous.

== Etymology ==
The species is named after its type locality, Beibeng.
