= Maladera fusconitens =

Scientific classification
- Kingdom: Animalia
- Phylum: Arthropoda
- Clade: Pancrustacea
- Class: Insecta
- Order: Coleoptera
- Suborder: Polyphaga
- Infraorder: Scarabaeiformia
- Family: Scarabaeidae
- Genus: Maladera
- Species: M. fusconitens

Binomial name
- Maladera fusconitens (Fairmaire, 1892)

Synonyms
- Serica fusconitens Fairmaire, 1892; Maladera (Aserica) villiersi Petrovitz, 1969

Species of beetle

Maladera fusconitens is a species of beetle of the family Scarabaeidae. It is found in Syria.

== Description ==
Adults reach a length of about 8.3–9.2 mm. They have a reddish-brown, oval body, with a slight metallic sheen. The antennae are light reddish-brown.
