= Maladera nanlingensis =

Scientific classification
- Kingdom: Animalia
- Phylum: Arthropoda
- Class: Insecta
- Order: Coleoptera
- Suborder: Polyphaga
- Infraorder: Scarabaeiformia
- Family: Scarabaeidae
- Genus: Maladera
- Species: M. nanlingensis

Binomial name
- Maladera nanlingensis Ahrens, Fabrizi & Liu, 2021

Species of beetle

Maladera nanlingensis is a species of beetle of the family Scarabaeidae. It is found in China (Guangdong).

== Description ==
Adults reach a length of about 7.6–7.8 mm. They have a dark brown, oblong body, with yellowish antennae. The dorsal surface is mostly dull and glabrous, except for a few setae on the head.

== Etymology ==
The species name refers to its occurrence in the Nanling National Nature Reserve.
