= Maladera lushuiensis =

Scientific classification
- Kingdom: Animalia
- Phylum: Arthropoda
- Class: Insecta
- Order: Coleoptera
- Suborder: Polyphaga
- Infraorder: Scarabaeiformia
- Family: Scarabaeidae
- Genus: Maladera
- Species: M. lushuiensis

Binomial name
- Maladera lushuiensis Ahrens, Fabrizi & Liu, 2021

Species of beetle

Maladera lushuiensis is a species of beetle of the family Scarabaeidae. It is found in China (Yunnan).

== Description ==
Adults reach a length of about 7.3 mm. They have an oblong-oval body. The dorsal surface is reddish brown and dull. The antennae are yellow. Except for some single setae on the head, the dorsal surface is nearly glabrous.

== Etymology ==
The species name refers to its type locality, Lushui.
