= Maladera ninglangensis =

Scientific classification
- Kingdom: Animalia
- Phylum: Arthropoda
- Class: Insecta
- Order: Coleoptera
- Suborder: Polyphaga
- Infraorder: Scarabaeiformia
- Family: Scarabaeidae
- Genus: Maladera
- Species: M. ninglangensis

Binomial name
- Maladera ninglangensis Ahrens, Fabrizi & Liu, 2021

Species of beetle

Maladera ninglangensis is a species of beetle of the family Scarabaeidae. It is found in China (Yunnan).

== Description ==
Adults reach a length of about 8.8 mm. They have a reddish brown, oval body. The antennae are brown. The labroclypeus is shiny, but the remainder of the dorsal surface is dull, with a few short setae on the head and elytra.

== Etymology ==
The species is named after the type locality, Ninglang.
