= Maladera qianqingtangensis =

Scientific classification
- Kingdom: Animalia
- Phylum: Arthropoda
- Class: Insecta
- Order: Coleoptera
- Suborder: Polyphaga
- Infraorder: Scarabaeiformia
- Family: Scarabaeidae
- Genus: Maladera
- Species: M. qianqingtangensis

Binomial name
- Maladera qianqingtangensis Ahrens, Fabrizi & Liu, 2021

Species of beetle

Maladera qianqingtangensis is a species of beetle of the family Scarabaeidae. It is found in China (Fujian, Zhejiang).

== Description ==
Adults reach a length of about 9.2–9.8 mm. They have a brown, oval body, with an iridescent shine. The antennae are yellow and there are a few single short setae on the head and elytra.

== Etymology ==
The species is named after its type locality, Qianqingtang.
