= Maladera rufopaca =

Scientific classification
- Kingdom: Animalia
- Phylum: Arthropoda
- Clade: Pancrustacea
- Class: Insecta
- Order: Coleoptera
- Suborder: Polyphaga
- Infraorder: Scarabaeiformia
- Family: Scarabaeidae
- Genus: Maladera
- Species: M. rufopaca

Binomial name
- Maladera rufopaca Ahrens, Fabrizi & Liu, 2021

Species of beetle

Maladera rufopaca is a species of beetle of the family Scarabaeidae. It is found in China (Yunnan), Laos, Thailand and Vietnam.

== Description ==
Adults reach a length of about 6.1–8 mm. They have a short oval, reddish brown body, with yellow antennae.

== Etymology ==
The species name is derived from the Latin words rufus (meaning red) and opacus (meaning dark).
