= Maladera schnitteri =

Scientific classification
- Kingdom: Animalia
- Phylum: Arthropoda
- Class: Insecta
- Order: Coleoptera
- Suborder: Polyphaga
- Infraorder: Scarabaeiformia
- Family: Scarabaeidae
- Genus: Maladera
- Species: M. schnitteri

Binomial name
- Maladera schnitteri Ahrens, Fabrizi & Rössner, 2016

Species of beetle

Maladera schnitteri is a species of beetle of the family Scarabaeidae. It is found in Jordan.

== Description ==
Adults reach a length of about 7.6 mm. They have a reddish-brown, elongate body. The dorsal and ventral surface are moderately shiny, and the dorsal surface (except for the lateral setae of the elytra and pronotum) is glabrous.

== Etymology ==
The species is named after its collector, Peer Schnitter.
