= Maladera tiachiensis =

Scientific classification
- Kingdom: Animalia
- Phylum: Arthropoda
- Class: Insecta
- Order: Coleoptera
- Suborder: Polyphaga
- Infraorder: Scarabaeiformia
- Family: Scarabaeidae
- Genus: Maladera
- Species: M. tiachiensis

Binomial name
- Maladera tiachiensis Ahrens, Fabrizi & Liu, 2021

Species of beetle

Maladera tiachiensis is a species of beetle of the family Scarabaeidae. It is found in China (Hainan) and Vietnam.

== Description ==
Adults reach a length of about 8.9–9.4 mm. They have a dark brown, oval body. The antennae are yellow, dull, while the labroclypeus is shiny. The dorsal surface is nearly glabrous.

== Etymology ==
The species name refers to its type locality, Tiachin.
