= Maladera danfengensis =

Scientific classification
- Kingdom: Animalia
- Phylum: Arthropoda
- Class: Insecta
- Order: Coleoptera
- Suborder: Polyphaga
- Infraorder: Scarabaeiformia
- Family: Scarabaeidae
- Genus: Maladera
- Species: M. danfengensis

Binomial name
- Maladera danfengensis Ahrens, Fabrizi & Liu, 2021

Species of beetle

Maladera danfengensis is a species of beetle of the family Scarabaeidae. It is found in China (Anhui, Gansu, Henan, Shaanxi).

== Description ==
Adults reach a length of about 8.4–9.4 mm. They have a dark brown, oblong-oval body, with yellow antennae. They are shiny and the dorsal surface is nearly glabrous.

== Etymology ==
The species name is derived from its type locality, Danfeng.
