= Maladera guomenshanica =

Scientific classification
- Kingdom: Animalia
- Phylum: Arthropoda
- Class: Insecta
- Order: Coleoptera
- Suborder: Polyphaga
- Infraorder: Scarabaeiformia
- Family: Scarabaeidae
- Genus: Maladera
- Species: M. guomenshanica

Binomial name
- Maladera guomenshanica Ahrens, Fabrizi & Liu, 2021

Species of beetle

Maladera guomenshanica is a species of beetle of the family Scarabaeidae. It is found in China (Yunnan).

== Description ==
Adults reach a length of about 9–9.2 mm. They have a yellowish brown, oblong-oval body. They are mostly dull (but the labroclypeus is shiny) and there are a few long setae on the head, pronotum and elytra.

== Etymology ==
The species is named after its type locality, Guomenshan.
