= Maladera hutiaoensis =

Scientific classification
- Kingdom: Animalia
- Phylum: Arthropoda
- Class: Insecta
- Order: Coleoptera
- Suborder: Polyphaga
- Infraorder: Scarabaeiformia
- Family: Scarabaeidae
- Genus: Maladera
- Species: M. hutiaoensis

Binomial name
- Maladera hutiaoensis Ahrens, Fabrizi & Liu, 2021

Species of beetle

Maladera hutiaoensis is a species of beetle of the family Scarabaeidae. It is found in China (Yunnan).

== Description ==
Adults reach a length of about 10.4–12.4 mm. They have a dark reddish brown, oval body, with yellowish antennae. The dorsal surface is slightly iridescent and shiny and almost glabrous.

== Etymology ==
The species is named after its type locality, the Hutiao gorge.
