= Maladera laocaiensis =

Scientific classification
- Kingdom: Animalia
- Phylum: Arthropoda
- Class: Insecta
- Order: Coleoptera
- Suborder: Polyphaga
- Infraorder: Scarabaeiformia
- Family: Scarabaeidae
- Genus: Maladera
- Species: M. laocaiensis

Binomial name
- Maladera laocaiensis Ahrens, Fabrizi & Liu, 2021

Species of beetle

Maladera laocaiensis is a species of beetle of the family Scarabaeidae. It is found in China (Yunnan) and Vietnam.

== Description ==
Adults reach a length of about 8.6–9.4 mm. They have a dark reddish brown, oval body, with the antennae yellow. The dorsal surface is iridescent shiny and nearly glabrous.

== Etymology ==
The species name refers to its occurrence in Lao Cai province.
