= Maladera ventriosa =

Scientific classification
- Kingdom: Animalia
- Phylum: Arthropoda
- Class: Insecta
- Order: Coleoptera
- Suborder: Polyphaga
- Infraorder: Scarabaeiformia
- Family: Scarabaeidae
- Genus: Maladera
- Species: M. ventriosa

Binomial name
- Maladera ventriosa (Brenske, 1894)

Synonyms
- Serica ventriosa Brenske, 1894; Autoserica spoliata Brenske, 1898; Autoserica discrepans Moser, 1915

Species of beetle

Maladera ventriosa is a species of beetle of the family Scarabaeidae. It is found in Sri Lanka and India (Maharashtra).

== Description ==
Adults reach a length of about 7.7 mm. They have a black to reddish brown, short, oval body. The dorsal surface is shiny and glabrous.
