= Maladera kalawensis =

Scientific classification
- Kingdom: Animalia
- Phylum: Arthropoda
- Class: Insecta
- Order: Coleoptera
- Suborder: Polyphaga
- Infraorder: Scarabaeiformia
- Family: Scarabaeidae
- Genus: Maladera
- Species: M. kalawensis

Binomial name
- Maladera kalawensis Ahrens, Fabrizi & Liu, 2021

Species of beetle

Maladera kalawensis is a species of beetle of the family Scarabaeidae. It is found in Myanmar, Thailand and China (Yunnan).

== Description ==
Adults reach a length of about 5.8–6.8 mm. They have a dark yellowish brown, oblong-oval body. The antennae are yellow. They are shiny and the dorsal surface is nearly glabrous.

== Etymology ==
The species is named after the type locality, Kalaw.
