= Maladera kermanensis =

Scientific classification
- Kingdom: Animalia
- Phylum: Arthropoda
- Class: Insecta
- Order: Coleoptera
- Suborder: Polyphaga
- Infraorder: Scarabaeiformia
- Family: Scarabaeidae
- Genus: Maladera
- Species: M. kermanensis

Binomial name
- Maladera kermanensis Fabrizi, Rößner & Ahrens, 2018

Species of beetle

Maladera kermanensis is a species of beetle of the family Scarabaeidae. It is found in Iran.

== Description ==
Adults reach a length of about 7.6 mm. They have a black, elongate body. The dorsal and ventral surface are moderately shiny, and the dorsal surface (except for the lateral setae of the elytra and pronotum) is glabrous.

== Etymology ==
The species is named after its occurrence in the Kerman province in Iran.
