= Maladera significans =

Scientific classification
- Kingdom: Animalia
- Phylum: Arthropoda
- Class: Insecta
- Order: Coleoptera
- Suborder: Polyphaga
- Infraorder: Scarabaeiformia
- Family: Scarabaeidae
- Genus: Maladera
- Species: M. significans

Binomial name
- Maladera significans (Brenske, 1898)

Synonyms
- Autoserica significans Brenske, 1898

Species of beetle

Maladera significans is a species of beetle of the family Scarabaeidae. It is found in India (Maharashtra).

== Description ==
Adults reach a length of about 8.4 mm. They have an oval body. The dorsal and ventral surface are dark brown, the elytra are reddish brown and the antennae are yellowish. They are dull (the pronotum with a greenish shine) and the dorsal surface is nearly glabrous, except for some setae on the head.
