= Maladera beidouensis =

Scientific classification
- Kingdom: Animalia
- Phylum: Arthropoda
- Class: Insecta
- Order: Coleoptera
- Suborder: Polyphaga
- Infraorder: Scarabaeiformia
- Family: Scarabaeidae
- Genus: Maladera
- Species: M. beidouensis

Binomial name
- Maladera beidouensis Ahrens, Fabrizi & Liu, 2021

Species of beetle

Maladera beidouensis is a species of beetle of the family Scarabaeidae. It is found in China (Guangxi).

== Description ==
Adults reach a length of about 9.9 mm. They have a dark brown, oblong-oval body. The antennae are yellow. The labroclypeus is weakly shiny, but the remainder of the dorsal surface is dull and glabrous.

== Etymology ==
The species name is derived from its type locality, Beidou.
