= Maladera diaolinensis =

Scientific classification
- Kingdom: Animalia
- Phylum: Arthropoda
- Class: Insecta
- Order: Coleoptera
- Suborder: Polyphaga
- Infraorder: Scarabaeiformia
- Family: Scarabaeidae
- Genus: Maladera
- Species: M. diaolinensis

Binomial name
- Maladera diaolinensis Ahrens, Fabrizi & Liu, 2021

Species of beetle

Maladera diaolinensis is a species of beetle of the family Scarabaeidae. It is found in China (Yunnan).

== Description ==
They have a dark reddish brown, oblong-oval body, with the antennae yellow. They are mostly dull, but the elytra and labroclypeus are iridescent and shiny. The dorsal face is nearly glabrous.

== Etymology ==
The species name is derived from its type locality, Diaolin.
