= Maladera shengqiaoae =

Scientific classification
- Kingdom: Animalia
- Phylum: Arthropoda
- Class: Insecta
- Order: Coleoptera
- Suborder: Polyphaga
- Infraorder: Scarabaeiformia
- Family: Scarabaeidae
- Genus: Maladera
- Species: M. shengqiaoae

Binomial name
- Maladera shengqiaoae Ahrens, Fabrizi & Liu, 2021

Species of beetle

Maladera shengqiaoae is a species of beetle of the family Scarabaeidae. It is found in China (Yunnan).

== Description ==
Adults reach a length of about 6 mm. They have a dark reddish brown, oval body. The antennae are yellow. The dorsal surface is dull and nearly glabrous, except for some single setae on the head.

== Etymology ==
The species is named after its collector, J. Shengqiao.
