= Maladera tongzhongensis =

Scientific classification
- Kingdom: Animalia
- Phylum: Arthropoda
- Class: Insecta
- Order: Coleoptera
- Suborder: Polyphaga
- Infraorder: Scarabaeiformia
- Family: Scarabaeidae
- Genus: Maladera
- Species: M. tongzhongensis

Binomial name
- Maladera tongzhongensis Ahrens, Fabrizi & Liu, 2021

Species of beetle

Maladera tongzhongensis is a species of beetle of the family Scarabaeidae. It is found in China (Guangxi).

== Description ==
Adults reach a length of about 11.5 mm. They have a dark reddish brown, oval body. The antennae are yellow. The dorsal surface is dull and, except for a few small setae on the head, glabrous.

== Etymology ==
The species is named after its type locality, Tongzhong.
