= Maladera eclogaria =

Scientific classification
- Kingdom: Animalia
- Phylum: Arthropoda
- Class: Insecta
- Order: Coleoptera
- Suborder: Polyphaga
- Infraorder: Scarabaeiformia
- Family: Scarabaeidae
- Genus: Maladera
- Species: M. eclogaria

Binomial name
- Maladera eclogaria (Brenske, 1899)

Synonyms
- Autoserica eclogaria Fairmaire, 1897

Species of beetle

Maladera eclogaria is a species of beetle of the family Scarabaeidae. It is found in Cambodia and Myanmar.

== Description ==
Adults reach a length of about 6 mm. They have an ovate, reddish-brown, opaque body, which is silky beneath. The legs are shiny. The elytra have punctures in rows, with the interstices not convex and evenly densely punctate.
