= Maladera fangchengensis =

Scientific classification
- Kingdom: Animalia
- Phylum: Arthropoda
- Clade: Pancrustacea
- Class: Insecta
- Order: Coleoptera
- Suborder: Polyphaga
- Infraorder: Scarabaeiformia
- Family: Scarabaeidae
- Genus: Maladera
- Species: M. fangchengensis

Binomial name
- Maladera fangchengensis Ahrens, Fabrizi & Liu, 2021

Species of beetle

Maladera fangchengensis is a species of beetle of the family Scarabaeidae. It is found in China (Guangxi), Thailand and Vietnam.

== Description ==
Adults reach a length of about 6.5–7.1 mm. They have a short oval, light reddish brown body, with yellow antennae.

== Etymology ==
The species name is derived from its occurrence in Fangcheng county.
