= Maladera gardneri =

Scientific classification
- Kingdom: Animalia
- Phylum: Arthropoda
- Class: Insecta
- Order: Coleoptera
- Suborder: Polyphaga
- Infraorder: Scarabaeiformia
- Family: Scarabaeidae
- Genus: Maladera
- Species: M. gardneri

Binomial name
- Maladera gardneri Ahrens, 2004

Species of beetle

Maladera gardneri is a species of beetle of the family Scarabaeidae. It is found in India (Uttarakhand) and Pakistan.

== Description ==
Adults reach a length of about 7–7.8 mm. They have a dark reddish brown, oval body. The upper surface is mostly dull and glabrous, except for a few setae on the head and the lateral cilia of the pronotum and elytra.

== Etymology ==
The species is named for its collector, J.C.M. Gardner.
