= Maladera holzschuhi =

Scientific classification
- Kingdom: Animalia
- Phylum: Arthropoda
- Class: Insecta
- Order: Coleoptera
- Suborder: Polyphaga
- Infraorder: Scarabaeiformia
- Family: Scarabaeidae
- Genus: Maladera
- Species: M. holzschuhi

Binomial name
- Maladera holzschuhi Ahrens, 2004

Species of beetle

Maladera holzschuhi is a species of beetle of the family Scarabaeidae. It is found in Nepal.

== Description ==
Adults reach a length of about 8.7–9.3 mm. They have a reddish brown to dark brown, oval body. The upper surface is mostly dull and glabrous, except for some setae on the head and the lateral cilia of the pronotum and elytra.

== Etymology ==
The species is named for its collector, Carolus Holzschuh.
