= Maladera wolfgangdierli =

Scientific classification
- Kingdom: Animalia
- Phylum: Arthropoda
- Class: Insecta
- Order: Coleoptera
- Suborder: Polyphaga
- Infraorder: Scarabaeiformia
- Family: Scarabaeidae
- Genus: Maladera
- Species: M. wolfgangdierli

Binomial name
- Maladera wolfgangdierli Ahrens, 2004

Synonyms
- Autoserica dierli Frey, 1972 (preocc.)

Species of beetle

Maladera wolfgangdierli is a species of beetle of the family Scarabaeidae. It is found in central Nepal.

== Description ==
Adults reach a length of about 8 mm. They have a reddish-brown, oval body. The upper surface is mostly dull and glabrous, except for some setae on the head and the lateral cilia of the pronotum and elytra.
