= Maladera bawanglingana =

Scientific classification
- Kingdom: Animalia
- Phylum: Arthropoda
- Class: Insecta
- Order: Coleoptera
- Suborder: Polyphaga
- Infraorder: Scarabaeiformia
- Family: Scarabaeidae
- Genus: Maladera
- Species: M. bawanglingana

Binomial name
- Maladera bawanglingana Ahrens, Fabrizi & Liu, 2021

Species of beetle

Maladera bawanglingana is a species of beetle of the family Scarabaeidae. It is found in China (Hainan).

== Description ==
Adults reach a length of about 10.6 mm. They have a dark brown, oval body. The antennae are brown. The labroclypeus are shiny, but the remainder of the dorsal surface is dull and glabrous.

== Etymology ==
The species name is derived from its type locality, Bawangling.
