= Maladera guanxiensis =

Scientific classification
- Kingdom: Animalia
- Phylum: Arthropoda
- Class: Insecta
- Order: Coleoptera
- Suborder: Polyphaga
- Infraorder: Scarabaeiformia
- Family: Scarabaeidae
- Genus: Maladera
- Species: M. guanxiensis

Binomial name
- Maladera guanxiensis Ahrens, Fabrizi & Liu, 2021

Species of beetle

Maladera guanxiensis is a species of beetle of the family Scarabaeidae. It is found in China (Guangxi).

== Description ==
Adults reach a length of about 6.6 mm. They have a dark reddish brown, oval body. The antennae are yellow and the dorsal surface is dull and, except for a few small setae on the head, glabrous.

== Etymology ==
The species is named after its occurrence in Guanxi province.
