= Maladera hastata =

Scientific classification
- Kingdom: Animalia
- Phylum: Arthropoda
- Class: Insecta
- Order: Coleoptera
- Suborder: Polyphaga
- Infraorder: Scarabaeiformia
- Family: Scarabaeidae
- Genus: Maladera
- Species: M. hastata

Binomial name
- Maladera hastata Fabrizi & Ahrens, 2014

Species of beetle

Maladera hastata is a species of beetle of the family Scarabaeidae. It is found in Sri Lanka.

== Description ==
Adults reach a length of about 7.4–8.1 mm. They have a dark brown, short oval body, with yellow antennae. The dorsal surface is shiny and densely and finely setose.

== Etymology ==
The species name is derived from Latin hastatus (meaning armed with a spear) and refers to the particular shape of aedeagus.
