= Maladera bezdeki =

Scientific classification
- Kingdom: Animalia
- Phylum: Arthropoda
- Clade: Pancrustacea
- Class: Insecta
- Order: Coleoptera
- Suborder: Polyphaga
- Infraorder: Scarabaeiformia
- Family: Scarabaeidae
- Genus: Maladera
- Species: M. bezdeki

Binomial name
- Maladera bezdeki Bhunia, Gupta, Sarkar & Ahrens, 2023

Species of beetle

Maladera bezdeki is a species of beetle of the family Scarabaeidae. It is found in India (Manipur).

== Description ==
Adults reach a length of about 9.21 mm. They have a yellowish brown, oblong-oval body. The dorsal surface is dull and glabrous.

== Etymology ==
The species is dedicated to Dr Aleš Bezděk.
