= Maladera jiangi =

Scientific classification
- Kingdom: Animalia
- Phylum: Arthropoda
- Class: Insecta
- Order: Coleoptera
- Suborder: Polyphaga
- Infraorder: Scarabaeiformia
- Family: Scarabaeidae
- Genus: Maladera
- Species: M. jiangi

Binomial name
- Maladera jiangi Ahrens, Fabrizi & Liu, 2021

Species of beetle

Maladera jiangi is a species of beetle of the family Scarabaeidae. It is found in China (Hainan).

== Description ==
Adults reach a length of about 11–12.5 mm. They have a reddish brown, oval body. The antennae are brown. The dorsal surface is dull and, except for a few small setae on the head and elytra, glabrous.

== Etymology ==
The species is named after the collector of the holotype, Jiang Shigui.
