= Maladera significabilis =

Scientific classification
- Kingdom: Animalia
- Phylum: Arthropoda
- Class: Insecta
- Order: Coleoptera
- Suborder: Polyphaga
- Infraorder: Scarabaeiformia
- Family: Scarabaeidae
- Genus: Maladera
- Species: M. significabilis

Binomial name
- Maladera significabilis (Brenske, 1902)

Synonyms
- Autoserica significans Brenske, 1898 (preocc.); Autoserica significabilis Brenske, 1902

Species of beetle

Maladera significabilis is a species of beetle of the family Scarabaeidae. It is found in India (Assam).

== Description ==
Adults reach a length of about 10.7 mm. They have a blackish-brown, oval body. The upper surface is mostly dull and glabrous, except for the lateral cilia of the pronotum and elytra.
