= Maladera umbilicata =

Scientific classification
- Kingdom: Animalia
- Phylum: Arthropoda
- Class: Insecta
- Order: Coleoptera
- Suborder: Polyphaga
- Infraorder: Scarabaeiformia
- Family: Scarabaeidae
- Genus: Maladera
- Species: M. umbilicata

Binomial name
- Maladera umbilicata (Brenske, 1899)

Synonyms
- Autoserica umbilicata Brenske, 1899

Species of beetle

Maladera umbilicata is a species of beetle of the family Scarabaeidae. It is found in India (Sikkim).

== Description ==
Adults reach a length of about 8.8 mm. They have a reddish-brown, elongate body. The antennae are yellowish-brown and the upper surface is weakly glossy and glabrous, except for the lateral cilia of the pronotum and elytra.
