= Maladera chiruwae =

Scientific classification
- Kingdom: Animalia
- Phylum: Arthropoda
- Class: Insecta
- Order: Coleoptera
- Suborder: Polyphaga
- Infraorder: Scarabaeiformia
- Family: Scarabaeidae
- Genus: Maladera
- Species: M. chiruwae

Binomial name
- Maladera chiruwae Ahrens, 2004

Species of beetle

Maladera chiruwae is a species of beetle of the family Scarabaeidae. It is found in Nepal.

== Description ==
Adults reach a length of about 8.6 mm. They have a chestnut brown, oval body, with the underside slightly lighter. The upper surface is mostly dull and glabrous, except for some setae on the head and the lateral cilia of the pronotum and elytra.

== Etymology ==
The species is named for its type locality, Chiruwa.
