= Maladera malangeana =

Scientific classification
- Kingdom: Animalia
- Phylum: Arthropoda
- Class: Insecta
- Order: Coleoptera
- Suborder: Polyphaga
- Infraorder: Scarabaeiformia
- Family: Scarabaeidae
- Genus: Maladera
- Species: M. malangeana

Binomial name
- Maladera malangeana (Brenske, 1902)

Synonyms
- Autoserica malangeana Brenske, 1902

Species of beetle

Maladera malangeana is a species of beetle of the family Scarabaeidae. It is found in Angola and the Democratic Republic of the Congo.

== Description ==
Adults reach a length of about 9 mm. They have a brown, broadly ovate body, with purplish-red tomentum on the upper surface. The elytra are punctate in rows, with minute hairs that become denser at the base and with white setae.
