= Maladera prenai =

Scientific classification
- Kingdom: Animalia
- Phylum: Arthropoda
- Class: Insecta
- Order: Coleoptera
- Suborder: Polyphaga
- Infraorder: Scarabaeiformia
- Family: Scarabaeidae
- Genus: Maladera
- Species: M. prenai

Binomial name
- Maladera prenai Ahrens, 2004

Species of beetle

Maladera prenai is a species of beetle of the family Scarabaeidae. It is found in India (Arunachal Pradesh, Sikkim) and Bhutan.

== Description ==
Adults reach a length of about 8.6–10.1 mm. They have a yellowish-brown to light reddish-brown, oblong-oval body. The upper surface is mostly dull and sparsely covered with hairs.

== Etymology ==
The species is named for Jens Prena, a friend of the author.
