= Maladera spinifemorata =

Scientific classification
- Kingdom: Animalia
- Phylum: Arthropoda
- Class: Insecta
- Order: Coleoptera
- Suborder: Polyphaga
- Infraorder: Scarabaeiformia
- Family: Scarabaeidae
- Genus: Maladera
- Species: M. spinifemorata

Binomial name
- Maladera spinifemorata Kobayashi, 1993

Species of beetle

Maladera spinifemorata is a species of beetle of the family Scarabaeidae. It is found in Taiwan.

== Description ==
Adults reach a length of about 12-12.5 mm. They have a reddish brown to dark reddish brown, oval body, with the antennal club yellowish brown. The dorsal surface is uniformly reddish brown. The surface of the body is opaque, with slight iridescence. The clypeus, antennae and legs are shining.
