= Maladera fatigata =

Scientific classification
- Kingdom: Animalia
- Phylum: Arthropoda
- Class: Insecta
- Order: Coleoptera
- Suborder: Polyphaga
- Infraorder: Scarabaeiformia
- Family: Scarabaeidae
- Genus: Maladera
- Species: M. fatigata

Binomial name
- Maladera fatigata Ahrens, 2004

Species of beetle

Maladera fatigata is a species of beetle of the family Scarabaeidae. It is found in Nepal.

== Description ==
Adults reach a length of about 7.7–9.7 mm. They have a reddish- to yellowish-brown, oval body. The upper surface is mostly dull and glabrous, except for some setae on the head and the lateral cilia of the pronotum and elytra.

== Etymology ==
The species name is derived from Latin fatigata (meaning tired).
