= Maladera jatuai =

Scientific classification
- Kingdom: Animalia
- Phylum: Arthropoda
- Class: Insecta
- Order: Coleoptera
- Suborder: Polyphaga
- Infraorder: Scarabaeiformia
- Family: Scarabaeidae
- Genus: Maladera
- Species: M. jatuai

Binomial name
- Maladera jatuai Ahrens, Fabrizi & Liu, 2021

Species of beetle

Maladera jatuai is a species of beetle of the family Scarabaeidae. It is found in China (Guizhou).

== Description ==
Adults reach a length of about 9.4 mm. They have a dark brown, oblong body, with yellow antennae. They are dull, the legs are brown and the antennae yellow. There are a few long setae on the dorsal surface.

== Etymology ==
The species is named after its collector, Mr. Jatua.
