= Maladera poyagana =

Scientific classification
- Kingdom: Animalia
- Phylum: Arthropoda
- Class: Insecta
- Order: Coleoptera
- Suborder: Polyphaga
- Infraorder: Scarabaeiformia
- Family: Scarabaeidae
- Genus: Maladera
- Species: M. poyagana

Binomial name
- Maladera poyagana Fabrizi & Ahrens, 2014

Species of beetle

Maladera poyagana is a species of beetle of the family Scarabaeidae. It is found in Sri Lanka.

== Description ==
Adults reach a length of about 9.2 mm. They have a dark brown, oval body, with yellowish brown antennae. The dorsal surface is dull and nearly glabrous, except for a few fine setae on the head, pronotum and elytra.

== Etymology ==
The species is named after Poyaga, the type locality.
