= Maladera rustica =

Scientific classification
- Kingdom: Animalia
- Phylum: Arthropoda
- Class: Insecta
- Order: Coleoptera
- Suborder: Polyphaga
- Infraorder: Scarabaeiformia
- Family: Scarabaeidae
- Genus: Maladera
- Species: M. rustica

Binomial name
- Maladera rustica (Brenske, 1896)

Synonyms
- Serica rustica Brenske, 1896

Species of beetle

Maladera rustica is a species of beetle of the family Scarabaeidae. It is found in India (Chhattisgarh).

== Description ==
Adults reach a length of about 6.3 mm. They have a black or dark brown, oval body, sometimes with a dull greenish or faint iridescent sheen. The upper surface is mostly dull and glabrous, except for the lateral cilia of the pronotum and elytra.
