= Maladera juntongi =

Scientific classification
- Kingdom: Animalia
- Phylum: Arthropoda
- Class: Insecta
- Order: Coleoptera
- Suborder: Polyphaga
- Infraorder: Scarabaeiformia
- Family: Scarabaeidae
- Genus: Maladera
- Species: M. juntongi

Binomial name
- Maladera juntongi Ahrens, Fabrizi & Liu, 2021

Species of beetle

Maladera juntongi is a species of beetle of the family Scarabaeidae. It is found in China (Hainan).

== Description ==
Adults reach a length of about 10.2 mm. They have a dark brown, oblong-oval body. The antennae are yellowish. The surface is glabrous and dull (but the labroclypeus is shiny).

== Etymology ==
The species is named in honour of one of its collectors, Lang Juntong.
