= Maladera levis =

Scientific classification
- Kingdom: Animalia
- Phylum: Arthropoda
- Class: Insecta
- Order: Coleoptera
- Suborder: Polyphaga
- Infraorder: Scarabaeiformia
- Family: Scarabaeidae
- Genus: Maladera
- Species: M. levis

Binomial name
- Maladera levis (Frey, 1972)

Synonyms
- Serica levis Frey, 1972

Species of beetle

Maladera levis is a species of beetle of the family Scarabaeidae. It is found in China (Fujian, Guangdong, Hubei, Hunan, Jiangxi) and Taiwan.

== Description ==
Adults reach a length of about 8.2 mm. They have a dark brown, oval body. The antennae are yellow, dull, while the labroclypeus is shiny. The dorsal face is nearly glabrous.
