= Maladera subtruncata =

Scientific classification
- Kingdom: Animalia
- Phylum: Arthropoda
- Class: Insecta
- Order: Coleoptera
- Suborder: Polyphaga
- Infraorder: Scarabaeiformia
- Family: Scarabaeidae
- Genus: Maladera
- Species: M. subtruncata

Binomial name
- Maladera subtruncata (Fairmaire, 1887)

Synonyms
- Serica subtruncata Fairmaire, 1887

Species of beetle

Maladera subtruncata is a species of beetle of the family Scarabaeidae. It is found in Thailand and China (Yunnan).

== Description ==
Adults reach a length of about 10.4 mm. They have a dark brown, oblong-oval body. They are mostly dull (but the labroclypeus is shiny) and the dorsal surface is nearly glabrous.
