= Maladera yunnanica =

Scientific classification
- Kingdom: Animalia
- Phylum: Arthropoda
- Class: Insecta
- Order: Coleoptera
- Suborder: Polyphaga
- Infraorder: Scarabaeiformia
- Family: Scarabaeidae
- Genus: Maladera
- Species: M. yunnanica

Binomial name
- Maladera yunnanica Ahrens, Fabrizi & Liu, 2021

Species of beetle

Maladera yunnanica is a species of beetle of the family Scarabaeidae. It is found in China (Yunnan).

== Description ==
Adults reach a length of about 8.8 mm. They have a dark brown, egg-shaped body, with yellow antennae. They are shiny (but the pronotum and scutellum are dull), and glabrous.

== Etymology ==
The species is named after its occurrence in Yunnan.
