= Maladera chinensis =

Scientific classification
- Kingdom: Animalia
- Phylum: Arthropoda
- Clade: Pancrustacea
- Class: Insecta
- Order: Coleoptera
- Suborder: Polyphaga
- Infraorder: Scarabaeiformia
- Family: Scarabaeidae
- Genus: Maladera
- Species: M. chinensis

Binomial name
- Maladera chinensis (Moser, 1915)

Synonyms
- Serica chinensis Moser, 1915

Species of beetle

Maladera chinensis is a species of beetle of the family Scarabaeidae. It is found in China (Beijing, Hebei, Shaanxi, Shandong).

== Description ==
Adults reach a length of about 6.6 mm. They have a dark reddish brown, dull, glabrous, oblong body. The legs are brown and the antennae are yellow.
