= Maladera coxalis =

Scientific classification
- Kingdom: Animalia
- Phylum: Arthropoda
- Clade: Pancrustacea
- Class: Insecta
- Order: Coleoptera
- Suborder: Polyphaga
- Infraorder: Scarabaeiformia
- Family: Scarabaeidae
- Genus: Maladera
- Species: M. coxalis

Binomial name
- Maladera coxalis (Moser, 1915)

Synonyms
- Autoserica coxalis Moser, 1915

Species of beetle

Maladera coxalis is a species of beetle of the family Scarabaeidae. It is found in Sri Lanka.

== Description ==
Adults reach a length of about 10.8 mm. They have a dark brown, oval body, with dark yellowish antennae. The dorsal surface is dull, with fine, sparse erect setae on the head and pronotum.
