= Maladera fencli =

Scientific classification
- Kingdom: Animalia
- Phylum: Arthropoda
- Clade: Pancrustacea
- Class: Insecta
- Order: Coleoptera
- Suborder: Polyphaga
- Infraorder: Scarabaeiformia
- Family: Scarabaeidae
- Genus: Maladera
- Species: M. fencli

Binomial name
- Maladera fencli Ahrens, Fabrizi & Liu, 2021

Species of beetle

Maladera fencli is a species of beetle of the family Scarabaeidae. It is found in China (Fujian, Guangdong, Hubei).

== Description ==
Adults reach a length of about 8.6–10.7 mm. They have an oblong-oval, dark reddish brown body with yellow antennae.

== Etymology ==
The species is named after one of its collectors, Rudolf Fencl.
