= Maladera nabanensis =

Scientific classification
- Kingdom: Animalia
- Phylum: Arthropoda
- Class: Insecta
- Order: Coleoptera
- Suborder: Polyphaga
- Infraorder: Scarabaeiformia
- Family: Scarabaeidae
- Genus: Maladera
- Species: M. nabanensis

Binomial name
- Maladera nabanensis Ahrens, Fabrizi & Liu, 2021

Species of beetle

Maladera nabanensis is a species of beetle of the family Scarabaeidae. It is found in China (Yunnan) and Laos.

== Description ==
Adults reach a length of about 5.4–6 mm. They have a dark brown, oblong-oval body, with yellowish antennae. The dorsal surface is shiny with many short hairs.

== Etymology ==
The species is named after its type locality, Na Ban village.
