= Maladera subrugata =

Scientific classification
- Kingdom: Animalia
- Phylum: Arthropoda
- Clade: Pancrustacea
- Class: Insecta
- Order: Coleoptera
- Suborder: Polyphaga
- Infraorder: Scarabaeiformia
- Family: Scarabaeidae
- Genus: Maladera
- Species: M. subrugata

Binomial name
- Maladera subrugata (Moser, 1926)

Synonyms
- Autoserica subrugata Moser, 1926; Eumaladera subrugata

Species of beetle

Maladera subrugata is a species of beetle of the family Scarabaeidae. It is found in China (Beijing, Guangxi, Hubei, Shaanxi).

== Description ==
Adults reach a length of about 8.2 mm. They have an oblong-oval, reddish brown body. The antennae are yellow.
