= Maladera weligamana =

Scientific classification
- Kingdom: Animalia
- Phylum: Arthropoda
- Class: Insecta
- Order: Coleoptera
- Suborder: Polyphaga
- Infraorder: Scarabaeiformia
- Family: Scarabaeidae
- Genus: Maladera
- Species: M. weligamana

Binomial name
- Maladera weligamana (Brenske, 1900)

Synonyms
- Autoserica weligamana Brenske, 1900

Species of beetle

Maladera weligamana is a species of beetle of the family Scarabaeidae. It is found in Sri Lanka.

== Description ==
Adults reach a length of about 9.6 mm. They have a dark reddish brown, oval body, with yellow antennae. The dorsal surface is dull, with fine, sparse to moderately dense, erect setae on the head, pronotum and elytra.
