= Maladera piceola =

Scientific classification
- Kingdom: Animalia
- Phylum: Arthropoda
- Clade: Pancrustacea
- Class: Insecta
- Order: Coleoptera
- Suborder: Polyphaga
- Infraorder: Scarabaeiformia
- Family: Scarabaeidae
- Genus: Maladera
- Species: M. piceola

Binomial name
- Maladera piceola (Moser, 1915)

Synonyms
- Autoserica piceola Moser, 1915

Species of beetle

Maladera piceola is a species of beetle of the family Scarabaeidae. It is found in China (Yunnan).

== Description ==
Adults reach a length of about 5.4 mm. They have a dark brown to dark reddish brown, oval body. The antennae are yellow. The dorsal surface is dull and nearly glabrous, except for some single setae on the head.
