= Maladera fushanica =

Scientific classification
- Kingdom: Animalia
- Phylum: Arthropoda
- Class: Insecta
- Order: Coleoptera
- Suborder: Polyphaga
- Infraorder: Scarabaeiformia
- Family: Scarabaeidae
- Genus: Maladera
- Species: M. fushanica

Binomial name
- Maladera fushanica (Ahrens, 2002)

Synonyms
- Eumaladera fushanica Ahrens, 2002

Species of beetle

Maladera fushanica is a species of beetle of the family Scarabaeidae. It is found in Taiwan.

== Description ==
Adults reach a length of about 7.3–7.7 mm. They have a blackish brown, oblong body. The antennae are brown. The dorsal surface is very shiny (ventrally dull) and glabrous, except for a few setae on the head.
