= Maladera jiraskovae =

Scientific classification
- Kingdom: Animalia
- Phylum: Arthropoda
- Class: Insecta
- Order: Coleoptera
- Suborder: Polyphaga
- Infraorder: Scarabaeiformia
- Family: Scarabaeidae
- Genus: Maladera
- Species: M. jiraskovae

Binomial name
- Maladera jiraskovae Sehnal, 2008

Synonyms
- Maladera (Eusericula) hivae Montreuil & Keith, 2009

Species of beetle

Maladera jiraskovae is a species of beetle of the family Scarabaeidae. It is found in Iran.

== Description ==
Adults reach a length of about 6.5–9 mm. They are dark reddish-brown, with the antennae and mouthparts yellowish-brown and the pronotal disc and elytra blackish-brown.
