= Maladera ollivieri =

Scientific classification
- Kingdom: Animalia
- Phylum: Arthropoda
- Class: Insecta
- Order: Coleoptera
- Suborder: Polyphaga
- Infraorder: Scarabaeiformia
- Family: Scarabaeidae
- Genus: Maladera
- Species: M. ollivieri

Binomial name
- Maladera ollivieri Keith, 1998

Species of beetle

Maladera ollivieri is a species of beetle of the family Scarabaeidae. It is found in Turkey.

== Description ==
Adults reach a length of about 7.5–8.5 mm. They have a black, oval body, with iridescent lead-grey reflections. There are large punctures on the clypeus, while the frons has smaller, less dense punctures. The antennal club is yellowish.

== Etymology ==
The species is named after Eric Ollivier.
