= Maladera yakouensis =

Scientific classification
- Kingdom: Animalia
- Phylum: Arthropoda
- Class: Insecta
- Order: Coleoptera
- Suborder: Polyphaga
- Infraorder: Scarabaeiformia
- Family: Scarabaeidae
- Genus: Maladera
- Species: M. yakouensis

Binomial name
- Maladera yakouensis Ahrens, Fabrizi & Liu, 2021

Species of beetle

Maladera yakouensis is a species of beetle of the family Scarabaeidae. It is found in China (Yunnan).

== Description ==
Adults reach a length of about 8.1 mm. They have a dark brown, oblong-oval body, with yellow antennae. They are shiny iridescent and the dorsal surface is nearly glabrous.

== Etymology ==
The species is named after its type locality, Yakou.
