= Maladera phoenicica =

Scientific classification
- Kingdom: Animalia
- Phylum: Arthropoda
- Clade: Pancrustacea
- Class: Insecta
- Order: Coleoptera
- Suborder: Polyphaga
- Infraorder: Scarabaeiformia
- Family: Scarabaeidae
- Genus: Maladera
- Species: M. phoenicica

Binomial name
- Maladera phoenicica Petrovitz, 1969

Species of beetle

Maladera phoenicica is a species of beetle of the family Scarabaeidae. It is found in Lebanon and Syria.

== Description ==
Adults reach a length of about 8.7–9.5 mm. They have a shiny, reddish to chestnut brown, narrow body, without a metallic sheen. The frons is usually darkened and the antennae and the hairs on the underside are yellowish-brown.
