= Maladera uhligi =

Scientific classification
- Kingdom: Animalia
- Phylum: Arthropoda
- Class: Insecta
- Order: Coleoptera
- Suborder: Polyphaga
- Infraorder: Scarabaeiformia
- Family: Scarabaeidae
- Genus: Maladera
- Species: M. uhligi

Binomial name
- Maladera uhligi Ahrens, 2004

Species of beetle

Maladera uhligi is a species of beetle of the family Scarabaeidae. It is found in India (Darjeeling, Sikkim).

== Description ==
Adults reach a length of about 11.7 mm. They have a dark brown, oval body. The upper surface is mostly dull and glabrous, except for the lateral cilia of the pronotum and elytra.

== Etymology ==
The species is named after Manfred Uhlig, a colleague of the author.
