= Maladera shaowuensis =

Scientific classification
- Kingdom: Animalia
- Phylum: Arthropoda
- Class: Insecta
- Order: Coleoptera
- Suborder: Polyphaga
- Infraorder: Scarabaeiformia
- Family: Scarabaeidae
- Genus: Maladera
- Species: M. shaowuensis

Binomial name
- Maladera shaowuensis Ahrens, Fabrizi & Liu, 2021

Species of beetle

Maladera shaowuensis is a species of beetle of the family Scarabaeidae. It is found in China (Fujian).

== Description ==
Adults reach a length of about 10.1 mm (0.40 in). They have an oblong, reddish brown body. The antennae are yellowish and the surface is dull.

== Etymology ==
The name of the species is derived from the name of its type locality, Shaowu.
