= Maladera silviae =

Scientific classification
- Kingdom: Animalia
- Phylum: Arthropoda
- Class: Insecta
- Order: Coleoptera
- Suborder: Polyphaga
- Infraorder: Scarabaeiformia
- Family: Scarabaeidae
- Genus: Maladera
- Species: M. silviae

Binomial name
- Maladera silviae Sreedevi & Ahrens, 2025

Species of beetle

Maladera silviae is a species of beetle of the family Scarabaeidae. It is found in India (Nagaland).

== Description ==
Adults reach a length of about 10.8 mm. They have a black, wide oval body. The dorsal surface is shiny and glabrous.

== Etymology ==
The species is named after the dedicated taxonomist, Silvia Fabrizi, in recognition of her contribution to Sericini taxonomy.
