= Maladera baishaoensis =

Scientific classification
- Kingdom: Animalia
- Phylum: Arthropoda
- Class: Insecta
- Order: Coleoptera
- Suborder: Polyphaga
- Infraorder: Scarabaeiformia
- Family: Scarabaeidae
- Genus: Maladera
- Species: M. baishaoensis

Binomial name
- Maladera baishaoensis Ahrens, Fabrizi & Liu, 2021

Species of beetle

Maladera baishaoensis is a species of beetle of the family Scarabaeidae. It is found in China (Guizhou).

== Description ==
Adults reach a length of about 8–8.5 mm. They have a reddish brown, dull, oval body, with yellow antennae. They are glabrous except for a few short setae on the head.

== Etymology ==
The species is named after its type locality, Baishao.
