= Maladera apfelbecki =

Scientific classification
- Kingdom: Animalia
- Phylum: Arthropoda
- Clade: Pancrustacea
- Class: Insecta
- Order: Coleoptera
- Suborder: Polyphaga
- Infraorder: Scarabaeiformia
- Family: Scarabaeidae
- Genus: Maladera
- Species: M. apfelbecki

Binomial name
- Maladera apfelbecki Petrovitz, 1969

Species of beetle

Maladera apfelbecki is a species of beetle of the family Scarabaeidae. It is found in Albania, Bulgaria, Greece and North Macedonia.

== Description ==
Adults reach a length of about 8–9.6 mm. They have a black, narrow, oval, shiny body, without a metallic sheen. The antennae and the setae on the underside are light reddish-brown.
