= Maladera botrytibia =

Scientific classification
- Kingdom: Animalia
- Phylum: Arthropoda
- Class: Insecta
- Order: Coleoptera
- Suborder: Polyphaga
- Infraorder: Scarabaeiformia
- Family: Scarabaeidae
- Genus: Maladera
- Species: M. botrytibia

Binomial name
- Maladera botrytibia Nomura, 1974

Species of beetle

Maladera botrytibia is a species of beetle of the family Scarabaeidae. It is found in Thailand, Taiwan and China (Anhui, Hainan, Hong Kong).

== Description ==
Adults reach a length of about 8.3 mm. They have a yellowish brown, oblong-oval body. They are mostly dull (but the labroclypeus is shiny) and there are a few long setae on the head, pronotum and elytra.
