= Maladera wipfleri =

Scientific classification
- Kingdom: Animalia
- Phylum: Arthropoda
- Class: Insecta
- Order: Coleoptera
- Suborder: Polyphaga
- Infraorder: Scarabaeiformia
- Family: Scarabaeidae
- Genus: Maladera
- Species: M. wipfleri

Binomial name
- Maladera wipfleri Ahrens, Fabrizi & Liu, 2021

Species of beetle

Maladera wipfleri is a species of beetle of the family Scarabaeidae. It is found in China (Sichuan).

== Description ==
Adults reach a length of about 10 mm. They have an oblong-oval, dark reddish brown body with yellow antennae.

== Etymology ==
The species is named for Benedict Wipfler, technical assistant at the section Coleoptera at the ZFMK.
