= Maladera comosa =

Scientific classification
- Kingdom: Animalia
- Phylum: Arthropoda
- Class: Insecta
- Order: Coleoptera
- Suborder: Polyphaga
- Infraorder: Scarabaeiformia
- Family: Scarabaeidae
- Genus: Maladera
- Species: M. comosa

Binomial name
- Maladera comosa (Brenske, 1899)

Synonyms
- Autoserica comosa Brenske, 1899

Species of beetle

Maladera comosa is a species of beetle of the family Scarabaeidae. It is found in India (Sikkim).

== Description ==
Adults reach a length of about 11.4 mm. They have a reddish-brown, oval body. The upper surface is mostly dull and finely but sparsely haired, the disc of the pronotum is glabrous. The ventral surface is densely haired.
