= Maladera kandyensis =

Scientific classification
- Kingdom: Animalia
- Phylum: Arthropoda
- Class: Insecta
- Order: Coleoptera
- Suborder: Polyphaga
- Infraorder: Scarabaeiformia
- Family: Scarabaeidae
- Genus: Maladera
- Species: M. kandyensis

Binomial name
- Maladera kandyensis Fabrizi & Ahrens, 2014

Species of beetle

Maladera kandyensis is a species of beetle of the family Scarabaeidae. It is found in Sri Lanka.

== Description ==
Adults reach a length of about 7.7–8.1 mm. They have a dark brown, short oval body, with yellow antennae. The dorsal surface is shiny and densely and finely setose.

== Etymology ==
The species name refers to its occurrence in the Kandy province.
