= Maladera puliensis =

Scientific classification
- Kingdom: Animalia
- Phylum: Arthropoda
- Class: Insecta
- Order: Coleoptera
- Suborder: Polyphaga
- Infraorder: Scarabaeiformia
- Family: Scarabaeidae
- Genus: Maladera
- Species: M. puliensis

Binomial name
- Maladera puliensis (Ahrens, 2002)

Synonyms
- Eumaladera puliensis Ahrens, 2002

Species of beetle

Maladera puliensis is a species of beetle of the family Scarabaeidae. It is found in Taiwan.

== Description ==
Adults reach a length of about 8.7 mm. They have a blackish brown, oblong body. The antennae are brown. The dorsal and ventral surface are very shiny, and, except for a few hairs on the head, glabrous.
