= Maladera queinneci =

Scientific classification
- Kingdom: Animalia
- Phylum: Arthropoda
- Class: Insecta
- Order: Coleoptera
- Suborder: Polyphaga
- Infraorder: Scarabaeiformia
- Family: Scarabaeidae
- Genus: Maladera
- Species: M. queinneci

Binomial name
- Maladera queinneci Ahrens, Fabrizi & Liu, 2021

Species of beetle

Maladera queinneci is a species of beetle of the family Scarabaeidae. It is found in China (Yunnan).

== Description ==
Adults reach a length of about 10.8 mm. They have a black, egg-shaped body. They are shiny, and nearly glabrous, except for the lateral setae of the pronotum and elytra.

== Etymology ==
The species is named after its collector, E. Queinnec.
