= Maladera spei =

Scientific classification
- Kingdom: Animalia
- Phylum: Arthropoda
- Class: Insecta
- Order: Coleoptera
- Suborder: Polyphaga
- Infraorder: Scarabaeiformia
- Family: Scarabaeidae
- Genus: Maladera
- Species: M. spei

Binomial name
- Maladera spei Ahrens, 2004

Species of beetle

Maladera spei is a species of beetle of the family Scarabaeidae. It is found in India (Sikkim) and Nepal.

== Description ==
Adults reach a length of about 7.8 mm. They have a reddish-brown, oval body. The upper surface is mostly dull and glabrous, except for some setae on the head and the lateral cilia of the pronotum and elytra.

== Etymology ==
The species name is derived from Latin spes (meaning hope).
