= Maladera masumotoi =

Scientific classification
- Kingdom: Animalia
- Phylum: Arthropoda
- Class: Insecta
- Order: Coleoptera
- Suborder: Polyphaga
- Infraorder: Scarabaeiformia
- Family: Scarabaeidae
- Genus: Maladera
- Species: M. masumotoi

Binomial name
- Maladera masumotoi Nomura, 1974

Species of beetle

Maladera masumotoi is a species of beetle of the family Scarabaeidae. It is found in China (Jiangxi) and Taiwan.

== Description ==
Adults reach a length of about 9.6 mm. They have a dark reddish brown, oblong-oval body. The antennae are yellowish. The surface is dull (but the labroclypeus is shiny) and glabrous, except for a few short setae on the sides of the elytra.
