= Maladera diyalumana =

Scientific classification
- Kingdom: Animalia
- Phylum: Arthropoda
- Class: Insecta
- Order: Coleoptera
- Suborder: Polyphaga
- Infraorder: Scarabaeiformia
- Family: Scarabaeidae
- Genus: Maladera
- Species: M. diyalumana

Binomial name
- Maladera diyalumana Fabrizi & Ahrens, 2014

Species of beetle

Maladera diyalumana is a species of beetle of the family Scarabaeidae. It is found in Sri Lanka.

== Description ==
Adults reach a length of about 8.4 mm. They have a dark reddish brown, oval body, with yellow antennae. The dorsal surface is dull and densely and finely setose.

== Etymology ==
The species is named after the type locality, Diyaluma Falls.
