= Maladera fistulosa =

Scientific classification
- Kingdom: Animalia
- Phylum: Arthropoda
- Class: Insecta
- Order: Coleoptera
- Suborder: Polyphaga
- Infraorder: Scarabaeiformia
- Family: Scarabaeidae
- Genus: Maladera
- Species: M. fistulosa

Binomial name
- Maladera fistulosa (Brenske, 1898)

Synonyms
- Autoserica fistulosa Brenske, 1898

Species of beetle

Maladera fistulosa is a species of beetle of the family Scarabaeidae. It is found in Sri Lanka.

== Description ==
Adults reach a length of about 7.8 mm. They have a dark brown, oval body, with yellow antennae. The dorsal surface is dull and glabrous, except for a few small setae on the head and elytra.
