= Maladera hajeki =

Scientific classification
- Kingdom: Animalia
- Phylum: Arthropoda
- Clade: Pancrustacea
- Class: Insecta
- Order: Coleoptera
- Suborder: Polyphaga
- Infraorder: Scarabaeiformia
- Family: Scarabaeidae
- Genus: Maladera
- Species: M. hajeki

Binomial name
- Maladera hajeki Ahrens, Fabrizi & Liu, 2021

Species of beetle

Maladera hajeki is a species of beetle of the family Scarabaeidae. It is found in China (Jiangxi).

== Description ==
Adults reach a length of about 9.2–9.5 mm. They have an oval dark brown body. The antennae are yellow.

== Etymology ==
The species is named for Jiri Hajek, one of the collectors of the species.
