= Maladera guomenshanensis =

Scientific classification
- Kingdom: Animalia
- Phylum: Arthropoda
- Class: Insecta
- Order: Coleoptera
- Suborder: Polyphaga
- Infraorder: Scarabaeiformia
- Family: Scarabaeidae
- Genus: Maladera
- Species: M. guomenshanensis

Binomial name
- Maladera guomenshanensis Ahrens, Fabrizi & Liu, 2021

Species of beetle

Maladera guomenshanensis is a species of beetle of the family Scarabaeidae. It is found in China (Yunnan).

== Description ==
Adults reach a length of about 13.8–14.7 mm. They have an oval, dull, dark brown body, with yellow antennae.

== Etymology ==
The species name is derived from the name of its type locality, Guomenshan.
