= Maladera schereri =

Scientific classification
- Kingdom: Animalia
- Phylum: Arthropoda
- Class: Insecta
- Order: Coleoptera
- Suborder: Polyphaga
- Infraorder: Scarabaeiformia
- Family: Scarabaeidae
- Genus: Maladera
- Species: M. schereri

Binomial name
- Maladera schereri (Frey, 1975)

Synonyms
- Autoserica schereri Frey, 1975

Species of beetle

Maladera schereri is a species of beetle of the family Scarabaeidae. It is found in India (Sikkim and West Bengal).

== Description ==
Adults reach a length of about 10.3 mm. They have a dark brown, oval body. The upper surface is mostly dull and glabrous, except for some setae on the head and the lateral cilia of the pronotum and elytra.
