= Maladera robustula =

Scientific classification
- Kingdom: Animalia
- Phylum: Arthropoda
- Class: Insecta
- Order: Coleoptera
- Suborder: Polyphaga
- Infraorder: Scarabaeiformia
- Family: Scarabaeidae
- Genus: Maladera
- Species: M. robustula

Binomial name
- Maladera robustula Ahrens, Fabrizi & Liu, 2021

Species of beetle

Maladera robustula is a species of beetle of the family Scarabaeidae. It is found in China (Hubei).

== Description ==
Adults reach a length of about 10.2 mm. They have an oblong-oval, dark reddish brown body with yellow antennae.

== Etymology ==
The name of the species is derived from Latin robustulus (mening rather robust) and refers to its large size and the large left paramere.
