= Maladera kolkataensis =

Scientific classification
- Kingdom: Animalia
- Phylum: Arthropoda
- Class: Insecta
- Order: Coleoptera
- Suborder: Polyphaga
- Infraorder: Scarabaeiformia
- Family: Scarabaeidae
- Genus: Maladera
- Species: M. kolkataensis

Binomial name
- Maladera kolkataensis Bhunia, Gupta, Sarkar & Ahrens, 2023

Species of beetle

Maladera kolkataensis is a species of beetle of the family Scarabaeidae. It is found in India (West Bengal).

== Description ==
Adults reach a length of about 9.2 mm. They have a dark black, oval body. The dorsal surface is dull and almost glabrous.

== Etymology ==
The species is named after its type locality, Kolkata.
