= Maladera spiralis =

Scientific classification
- Kingdom: Animalia
- Phylum: Arthropoda
- Class: Insecta
- Order: Coleoptera
- Suborder: Polyphaga
- Infraorder: Scarabaeiformia
- Family: Scarabaeidae
- Genus: Maladera
- Species: M. spiralis

Binomial name
- Maladera spiralis Ahrens, 2003

Species of beetle

Maladera spiralis is a species of beetle of the family Scarabaeidae. It is found in India (Andaman Islands, Nicobar Islands).

== Description ==
Adults reach a length of about 7.2–8.1 mm. They have a reddish brown to dark brown, oval body. The dorsal surface is iridescent shiny and, except for the setae on the head and along the margins of the pronotum and elytra, glabrous.
