= Maladera maxima =

Scientific classification
- Kingdom: Animalia
- Phylum: Arthropoda
- Class: Insecta
- Order: Coleoptera
- Suborder: Polyphaga
- Infraorder: Scarabaeiformia
- Family: Scarabaeidae
- Genus: Maladera
- Species: M. maxima

Binomial name
- Maladera maxima (Brenske, 1899)

Synonyms
- Autoserica maxima Brenske, 1899

Species of beetle

Maladera maxima is a species of beetle of the family Scarabaeidae. It is found in Bangladesh.

== Description ==
Adults reach a length of about 12.7 mm. They have a chestnut brown, oval body. The upper surface is mostly dull and glabrous, except for some setae on the head and the lateral cilia of the pronotum and elytra.
