= Maladera brevistylis =

Scientific classification
- Kingdom: Animalia
- Phylum: Arthropoda
- Class: Insecta
- Order: Coleoptera
- Suborder: Polyphaga
- Infraorder: Scarabaeiformia
- Family: Scarabaeidae
- Genus: Maladera
- Species: M. brevistylis

Binomial name
- Maladera brevistylis Ahrens, 2004

Species of beetle

Maladera brevistylis is a species of beetle of the family Scarabaeidae. It is found in India (Uttar Pradesh) and Nepal.

== Description ==
Adults reach a length of about 7.6–8.1 mm. They have a light reddish-brown, oval body. The upper surface is mostly dull and glabrous, except for some setae on the head and the lateral cilia of the pronotum and elytra.
