= Maladera brincki =

Scientific classification
- Kingdom: Animalia
- Phylum: Arthropoda
- Class: Insecta
- Order: Coleoptera
- Suborder: Polyphaga
- Infraorder: Scarabaeiformia
- Family: Scarabaeidae
- Genus: Maladera
- Species: M. brincki

Binomial name
- Maladera brincki Fabrizi & Ahrens, 2014

Species of beetle

Maladera brincki is a species of beetle of the family Scarabaeidae. It is found in Sri Lanka.

== Description ==
Adults reach a length of about 6.2–6.5 mm. They have a dark reddish brown, oval body, with yellow antennae. The dorsal surface is dull and densely and finely setose.

== Etymology ==
The species is named after one of its collectors, P. Brinck.
