= Maladera paris =

Scientific classification
- Kingdom: Animalia
- Phylum: Arthropoda
- Class: Insecta
- Order: Coleoptera
- Suborder: Polyphaga
- Infraorder: Scarabaeiformia
- Family: Scarabaeidae
- Genus: Maladera
- Species: M. paris

Binomial name
- Maladera paris Ahrens, 2004

Species of beetle

Maladera paris is a species of beetle of the family Scarabaeidae. It is found in India (Sikkim).

== Description ==
Adults reach a length of about 8.6–9 mm. They have a reddish to chestnut brown, oval body. The upper surface is mostly dull and glabrous, except for some setae on the head and the lateral cilia of the pronotum and elytra.

== Etymology ==
The species name is derived from Latin par.
