= Maladera lyciensis =

Scientific classification
- Kingdom: Animalia
- Phylum: Arthropoda
- Clade: Pancrustacea
- Class: Insecta
- Order: Coleoptera
- Suborder: Polyphaga
- Infraorder: Scarabaeiformia
- Family: Scarabaeidae
- Genus: Maladera
- Species: M. lyciensis

Binomial name
- Maladera lyciensis Petrovitz, 1969

Species of beetle

Maladera lyciensis is a species of beetle of the family Scarabaeidae. It is found in Turkey.

== Description ==
Adults reach a length of about 8.4–9.3 mm. They have a shiny, chestnut brown, narrow body, without a metallic sheen. The frons is darkened and the antennae and setae of the underside are light yellowish-brown.
