= Maladera paraquinquidens =

Scientific classification
- Kingdom: Animalia
- Phylum: Arthropoda
- Class: Insecta
- Order: Coleoptera
- Suborder: Polyphaga
- Infraorder: Scarabaeiformia
- Family: Scarabaeidae
- Genus: Maladera
- Species: M. paraquinquidens

Binomial name
- Maladera paraquinquidens Ahrens, 2004

Species of beetle

Maladera paraquinquidens is a species of beetle of the family Scarabaeidae. It is found in India (Sikkim, West Bengal) and Bhutan.

== Description ==
Adults reach a length of about 6.3–6.8 mm. They have a dark brown, elongate-oval body, partly with a greenish sheen. The upper surface is mostly dull and nearly glabrous.
