= Maladera attaliensis =

Scientific classification
- Kingdom: Animalia
- Phylum: Arthropoda
- Clade: Pancrustacea
- Class: Insecta
- Order: Coleoptera
- Suborder: Polyphaga
- Infraorder: Scarabaeiformia
- Family: Scarabaeidae
- Genus: Maladera
- Species: M. attaliensis

Binomial name
- Maladera attaliensis Petrovitz, 1969

Species of beetle

Maladera attaliensis is a species of beetle of the family Scarabaeidae. It is found in Turkey.

== Description ==
Adults reach a length of about 8.4–8.9 mm. They have a shiny, light reddish-brown, narrow, oval body, without a metallic sheen. The antennae and setae of the underside are lighter yellowish-brown.
