= Maladera irididorsis =

Scientific classification
- Kingdom: Animalia
- Phylum: Arthropoda
- Clade: Pancrustacea
- Class: Insecta
- Order: Coleoptera
- Suborder: Polyphaga
- Infraorder: Scarabaeiformia
- Family: Scarabaeidae
- Genus: Maladera
- Species: M. irididorsis

Binomial name
- Maladera irididorsis Ahrens, 2004

Species of beetle

Maladera irididorsis is a species of beetle of the family Scarabaeidae. It is found in India (Assam).

== Description ==
Adults reach a length of about 8.3 mm. They have a light reddish-brown, oval body. The upper surface is highly glossy and glabrous, except for some setae on the head and the lateral cilia of the pronotum and elytra.
