= Maladera harmonica =

Scientific classification
- Kingdom: Animalia
- Phylum: Arthropoda
- Class: Insecta
- Order: Coleoptera
- Suborder: Polyphaga
- Infraorder: Scarabaeiformia
- Family: Scarabaeidae
- Genus: Maladera
- Species: M. harmonica

Binomial name
- Maladera harmonica (Brenske, 1898)

Synonyms
- Autoserica harmonica Brenske, 1898

Species of beetle

Maladera harmonica is a species of beetle of the family Scarabaeidae. It is found in China (Fujian).

== Description ==
Adults reach a length of about 7.9 mm. They have an oval, reddish brown body, with yellow antennae. The dorsal surface is dull, with an iridescent tinge on the pronotum.
