= Maladera mofidii =

Scientific classification
- Kingdom: Animalia
- Phylum: Arthropoda
- Clade: Pancrustacea
- Class: Insecta
- Order: Coleoptera
- Suborder: Polyphaga
- Infraorder: Scarabaeiformia
- Family: Scarabaeidae
- Genus: Maladera
- Species: M. mofidii

Binomial name
- Maladera mofidii Montreuil & Keith, 2009

Species of beetle

Maladera mofidii is a species of beetle of the family Scarabaeidae. It is found in Iran.

== Description ==
Adults reach a length of about 9 mm. They are dark reddish-brown, with the antennae and mouthparts brownish-yellow.

== Etymology ==
The species is named after Mohsen Mofidi Neyestanak.
