= Maladera exigua =

Scientific classification
- Kingdom: Animalia
- Phylum: Arthropoda
- Class: Insecta
- Order: Coleoptera
- Suborder: Polyphaga
- Infraorder: Scarabaeiformia
- Family: Scarabaeidae
- Genus: Maladera
- Species: M. exigua

Binomial name
- Maladera exigua (Brenske, 1894)

Synonyms
- Serica exigua Brenske, 1894

Species of beetle

Maladera exigua is a species of beetle of the family Scarabaeidae. It is found in China (Jiangsu).

== Description ==
Adults reach a length of about 7.6 mm. They have a dark brown, oval body, with a yellow antennal club. The dorsal surface is mostly dull and glabrous, except for a few setae on the head.
