= Maladera cobosi =

Scientific classification
- Kingdom: Animalia
- Phylum: Arthropoda
- Class: Insecta
- Order: Coleoptera
- Suborder: Polyphaga
- Infraorder: Scarabaeiformia
- Family: Scarabaeidae
- Genus: Maladera
- Species: M. cobosi

Binomial name
- Maladera cobosi Baraud, 1964

Synonyms
- Amaladera cobosi Baraud, 1964

Species of beetle

Maladera cobosi is a species of beetle of the family Scarabaeidae. It is found in France and Spain.

== Description ==
Adults reach a length of about 7-7.5 mm. They have a dark reddish-brown to blackish-brown body, with fine, very dense punctation on the clypeus, pronotum and elytra.
