= Maladera flammea =

Scientific classification
- Kingdom: Animalia
- Phylum: Arthropoda
- Class: Insecta
- Order: Coleoptera
- Suborder: Polyphaga
- Infraorder: Scarabaeiformia
- Family: Scarabaeidae
- Genus: Maladera
- Species: M. flammea

Binomial name
- Maladera flammea (Brenske, 1899)

Synonyms
- Autoserica flammea Brenske, 1899

Species of beetle

Maladera flammea is a species of beetle of the family Scarabaeidae. It is found in China (Hong Kong).

== Description ==
Adults reach a length of about 9 mm. They have a reddish brown, oval body, with yellow antennae. The dorsal surface is mostly dull and glabrous, except for a few setae on the head.
