= Maladera eshanensis =

Scientific classification
- Kingdom: Animalia
- Phylum: Arthropoda
- Class: Insecta
- Order: Coleoptera
- Suborder: Polyphaga
- Infraorder: Scarabaeiformia
- Family: Scarabaeidae
- Genus: Maladera
- Species: M. eshanensis

Binomial name
- Maladera eshanensis Ahrens, Fabrizi & Liu, 2021

Species of beetle

Maladera eshanensis is a species of beetle of the family Scarabaeidae. It is found in China (Yunnan).

== Description ==
Adults reach a length of about 9.4 mm. They have a short oval, dark reddish brown body, with yellow antennae.

== Etymology ==
The species name is derived from its type locality, Mt. Eshan.
