= Maladera girardi =

Scientific classification
- Kingdom: Animalia
- Phylum: Arthropoda
- Class: Insecta
- Order: Coleoptera
- Suborder: Polyphaga
- Infraorder: Scarabaeiformia
- Family: Scarabaeidae
- Genus: Maladera
- Species: M. girardi

Binomial name
- Maladera girardi Keith & Ahrens, 2002

Species of beetle

Maladera girardi is a species of beetle of the family Scarabaeidae. It is found in Iran.

== Description ==
Adults reach a length of about 8.7–9.2 mm. They have a black, elongate oval body, with the margins of the pronotum and the margins of the elytra brown. The upper surface is shiny.

== Etymology ==
The species is named after Dr. Claude Girard.
