= Maladera duvivieri =

Scientific classification
- Kingdom: Animalia
- Phylum: Arthropoda
- Class: Insecta
- Order: Coleoptera
- Suborder: Polyphaga
- Infraorder: Scarabaeiformia
- Family: Scarabaeidae
- Genus: Maladera
- Species: M. duvivieri

Binomial name
- Maladera duvivieri (Brenske, 1896)

Synonyms
- Serica duvivieri Brenske, 1896

Species of beetle

Maladera duvivieri is a species of beetle of the family Scarabaeidae. It is found in India (Sikkim, West Bengal).

== Description ==
Adults reach a length of about 11 mm. They have a chestnut brown, elongate-oval body. The upper surface is mostly dull and glabrous.
