= Maladera shouchiana =

Scientific classification
- Kingdom: Animalia
- Phylum: Arthropoda
- Class: Insecta
- Order: Coleoptera
- Suborder: Polyphaga
- Infraorder: Scarabaeiformia
- Family: Scarabaeidae
- Genus: Maladera
- Species: M. shouchiana

Binomial name
- Maladera shouchiana Kobayashi & Yu, 1997

Species of beetle

Maladera shouchiana is a species of beetle of the family Scarabaeidae. It is found in Taiwan.

== Description ==
Adults reach a length of about 10–11 mm. They have an oval body. The ventral surface and legs are reddish brown and the dorsal surface is uniformly blackish brown or dark reddish brown. The antennae are yellowish brown.
