= Maladera ahrensi =

Scientific classification
- Kingdom: Animalia
- Phylum: Arthropoda
- Class: Insecta
- Order: Coleoptera
- Suborder: Polyphaga
- Infraorder: Scarabaeiformia
- Family: Scarabaeidae
- Genus: Maladera
- Species: M. ahrensi

Binomial name
- Maladera ahrensi Keith, 2005

Species of beetle

Maladera ahrensi is a species of beetle of the family Scarabaeidae. It is found in Iran.

== Description ==
Adults reach a length of about 8 mm. They have a pitch brown, oval body. The ventral surface is lighter. The surface is shiny, with very small faint punctures.

== Etymology ==
The species is named in honour of Dirk Ahrens.
