= Maladera weni =

Scientific classification
- Kingdom: Animalia
- Phylum: Arthropoda
- Class: Insecta
- Order: Coleoptera
- Suborder: Polyphaga
- Infraorder: Scarabaeiformia
- Family: Scarabaeidae
- Genus: Maladera
- Species: M. weni

Binomial name
- Maladera weni Ahrens, Fabrizi & Liu, 2021

Species of beetle

Maladera weni is a species of beetle of the family Scarabaeidae. It is found in China (Anhui, Hubei).

== Description ==
Adults reach a length of about 8–8.8 mm. They have an oval, dull, blackish brown body, with yellow antennae.

== Etymology ==
The species name is derived from the name of the collector, Mr. Wen.
