= Maladera taurica =

Scientific classification
- Kingdom: Animalia
- Phylum: Arthropoda
- Clade: Pancrustacea
- Class: Insecta
- Order: Coleoptera
- Suborder: Polyphaga
- Infraorder: Scarabaeiformia
- Family: Scarabaeidae
- Genus: Maladera
- Species: M. taurica

Binomial name
- Maladera taurica Petrovitz, 1969

Species of beetle

Maladera taurica is a species of beetle of the family Scarabaeidae. It is found in Turkey.

== Description ==
Adults reach a length of about 9.3–10.9 mm. They have a pitch-brown to black body, without a metallic sheen. The antennae and the setae of the under surface are yellowish-brown to light reddish-brown.
