= Maladera wewalkai =

Scientific classification
- Kingdom: Animalia
- Phylum: Arthropoda
- Clade: Pancrustacea
- Class: Insecta
- Order: Coleoptera
- Suborder: Polyphaga
- Infraorder: Scarabaeiformia
- Family: Scarabaeidae
- Genus: Maladera
- Species: M. wewalkai

Binomial name
- Maladera wewalkai Petrovitz, 1969

Species of beetle

Maladera wewalkai is a species of beetle of the family Scarabaeidae. It is found in Turkey.

== Description ==
Adults reach a length of about 8.2–8.5 mm. They have a shiny, light reddish-brown, egg-shaped body. The forehead is darker and the antennae are brownish-yellow.
