= Maladera lata =

Scientific classification
- Kingdom: Animalia
- Phylum: Arthropoda
- Class: Insecta
- Order: Coleoptera
- Suborder: Polyphaga
- Infraorder: Scarabaeiformia
- Family: Scarabaeidae
- Genus: Maladera
- Species: M. lata

Binomial name
- Maladera lata (Brenske, 1902)

Synonyms
- Autoserica lata Brenske, 1902

Species of beetle

Maladera lata is a species of beetle of the family Scarabaeidae. It is found in Angola.

== Description ==
Adults reach a length of about 11 mm. They have a brown body, with a slightly greenish tinge. The elytra are distinctly punctate in rows. There are also tiny hairs and white setae present.
