= Maladera cerrutii =

Scientific classification
- Kingdom: Animalia
- Phylum: Arthropoda
- Class: Insecta
- Order: Coleoptera
- Suborder: Polyphaga
- Infraorder: Scarabaeiformia
- Family: Scarabaeidae
- Genus: Maladera
- Species: M. cerrutii

Binomial name
- Maladera cerrutii Sabatinelli, 1977

Species of beetle

Maladera cerrutii is a species of beetle of the family Scarabaeidae. It is found on Cyprus.

== Description ==
Adults reach a length of about 9 mm. They are brownish light fulvous and nearly glabrous, with only a few scattered short hairs.

== Etymology ==
The species is named after Marcello Cerruti.
