= Maladera omanica =

Scientific classification
- Kingdom: Animalia
- Phylum: Arthropoda
- Class: Insecta
- Order: Coleoptera
- Suborder: Polyphaga
- Infraorder: Scarabaeiformia
- Family: Scarabaeidae
- Genus: Maladera
- Species: M. omanica

Binomial name
- Maladera omanica (Ahrens, 2000)

Synonyms
- Autoserica omanica Ahrens, 2000

Species of beetle

Maladera omanica is a species of beetle of the family Scarabaeidae. It is found in Oman.

== Description ==
Adults reach a length of about 7.5 mm. They are reddish-brown. The dorsal surface is mostly glabrous, except for the shiny labroclypeus.
