= Maladera taoyuanensis =

Scientific classification
- Kingdom: Animalia
- Phylum: Arthropoda
- Class: Insecta
- Order: Coleoptera
- Suborder: Polyphaga
- Infraorder: Scarabaeiformia
- Family: Scarabaeidae
- Genus: Maladera
- Species: M. taoyuanensis

Binomial name
- Maladera taoyuanensis Kobayashi, 1991

Species of beetle

Maladera taoyuanensis is a species of beetle of the family Scarabaeidae. It is found in Taiwan.

== Description ==
Adults reach a length of about 10.5 mm. They have a dark reddish brown, elongate oval body, with a reddish brown antennal club. The dorsal surface is blackish brown.
