= Maladera granuligera =

Scientific classification
- Kingdom: Animalia
- Phylum: Arthropoda
- Class: Insecta
- Order: Coleoptera
- Suborder: Polyphaga
- Infraorder: Scarabaeiformia
- Family: Scarabaeidae
- Genus: Maladera
- Species: M. granuligera

Binomial name
- Maladera granuligera (Blanchard, 1850)

Synonyms
- Omaloplia granuligera Blanchard, 1850

Species of beetle

Maladera granuligera is a species of beetle of the family Scarabaeidae. It is found in India.

== Description ==
Adults reach a length of about 8.8 mm. They have a black, wide, oval body. The dorsal surface is dull and glabrous.
