= Maladera bruschii =

Scientific classification
- Kingdom: Animalia
- Phylum: Arthropoda
- Class: Insecta
- Order: Coleoptera
- Suborder: Polyphaga
- Infraorder: Scarabaeiformia
- Family: Scarabaeidae
- Genus: Maladera
- Species: M. bruschii

Binomial name
- Maladera bruschii Sabatinelli, 1977

Species of beetle

Maladera bruschii is a species of beetle of the family Scarabaeidae. It is found in Turkey.

== Description ==
Adults reach a length of about 10.2 mm. They are dark brown, with the antennae and palpi fuscous.

== Etymology ==
The species is named after the architect Sandro Bruschi.
