= Maladera philippinica =

Scientific classification
- Kingdom: Animalia
- Phylum: Arthropoda
- Class: Insecta
- Order: Coleoptera
- Suborder: Polyphaga
- Infraorder: Scarabaeiformia
- Family: Scarabaeidae
- Genus: Maladera
- Species: M. philippinica

Binomial name
- Maladera philippinica (Brenske, 1894)

Synonyms
- Serica philippinica Brenske, 1894

Species of beetle

Maladera philippinica is a species of beetle of the family Scarabaeidae. It is found in the Philippines.

== Description ==
Adults reach a length of about 6–7 mm. They are dark and shiny, with clay-yellow elytra.
