= Maladera sinaica =

Scientific classification
- Kingdom: Animalia
- Phylum: Arthropoda
- Class: Insecta
- Order: Coleoptera
- Suborder: Polyphaga
- Infraorder: Scarabaeiformia
- Family: Scarabaeidae
- Genus: Maladera
- Species: M. sinaica

Binomial name
- Maladera sinaica Ahrens, 2000

Species of beetle

Maladera sinaica is a species of beetle of the family Scarabaeidae.

== Distribution ==
It is found in Egypt.

== Description ==
Adults reach a length of about 9.2 mm. They have a reddish-brown, wide, elongate-oval body. The dorsal surface is shiny.
