= Maladera eluctabilis =

Scientific classification
- Kingdom: Animalia
- Phylum: Arthropoda
- Class: Insecta
- Order: Coleoptera
- Suborder: Polyphaga
- Infraorder: Scarabaeiformia
- Family: Scarabaeidae
- Genus: Maladera
- Species: M. eluctabilis

Binomial name
- Maladera eluctabilis (Brenske, 1899)

Synonyms
- Autoserica eluctabilis Brenske, 1899

Species of beetle

Maladera eluctabilis is a species of beetle of the family Scarabaeidae. It is found in Cambodia and Thailand.

== Description ==
Adults reach a length of about 6 mm.
