= Maladera farsensis =

Scientific classification
- Kingdom: Animalia
- Phylum: Arthropoda
- Clade: Pancrustacea
- Class: Insecta
- Order: Coleoptera
- Suborder: Polyphaga
- Infraorder: Scarabaeiformia
- Family: Scarabaeidae
- Genus: Maladera
- Species: M. farsensis

Binomial name
- Maladera farsensis Petrovitz, 1980

Species of beetle

Maladera farsensis is a species of beetle of the family Scarabaeidae. It is found in Iran.

== Description ==
Adults reach a length of about 9.2–10 mm. They have a blackish-brown, elongate oval body, with lighter margins.
