= Maladera hodkovae =

Scientific classification
- Kingdom: Animalia
- Phylum: Arthropoda
- Class: Insecta
- Order: Coleoptera
- Suborder: Polyphaga
- Infraorder: Scarabaeiformia
- Family: Scarabaeidae
- Genus: Maladera
- Species: M. hodkovae

Binomial name
- Maladera hodkovae Nikodým & Král, 1998

Species of beetle

Maladera hodkovae is a species of beetle of the family Scarabaeidae. It is found in Iran.

== Description ==
Adults reach a length of about 7.5–8 mm. They have a pitch-black, elongate oval body, with a lighter lower surface.
