= Maladera besucheti =

Scientific classification
- Kingdom: Animalia
- Phylum: Arthropoda
- Class: Insecta
- Order: Coleoptera
- Suborder: Polyphaga
- Infraorder: Scarabaeiformia
- Family: Scarabaeidae
- Genus: Maladera
- Species: M. besucheti

Binomial name
- Maladera besucheti Baraud, 1990

Species of beetle

Maladera besucheti is a species of beetle of the family Scarabaeidae. It is found in Turkey.

== Description ==
Adults reach a length of about 8 mm. They have a reddish-brown, shiny body. The antennal club is yellowish-brown.
