= Maladera poonensis =

Scientific classification
- Kingdom: Animalia
- Phylum: Arthropoda
- Class: Insecta
- Order: Coleoptera
- Suborder: Polyphaga
- Infraorder: Scarabaeiformia
- Family: Scarabaeidae
- Genus: Maladera
- Species: M. poonensis

Binomial name
- Maladera poonensis (Khan & Ghai, 1980)

Synonyms
- Autoserica poonensis Khan & Ghai, 1980

Species of beetle

Maladera poonensis is a species of beetle of the family Scarabaeidae. It is found in India (Maharashtra).
