= Maladera golovjankoi =

Scientific classification
- Kingdom: Animalia
- Phylum: Arthropoda
- Class: Insecta
- Order: Coleoptera
- Suborder: Polyphaga
- Infraorder: Scarabaeiformia
- Family: Scarabaeidae
- Genus: Maladera
- Species: M. golovjankoi

Binomial name
- Maladera golovjankoi Medvedev, 1952

Species of beetle

Maladera golovjankoi is a species of beetle of the family Scarabaeidae. It is found in China (Xinjiang), Tajikistan and Turkmenistan.
