= Maladera weigeli =

Scientific classification
- Kingdom: Animalia
- Phylum: Arthropoda
- Class: Insecta
- Order: Coleoptera
- Suborder: Polyphaga
- Infraorder: Scarabaeiformia
- Family: Scarabaeidae
- Genus: Maladera
- Species: M. weigeli

Binomial name
- Maladera weigeli Ahrens, 2004

Species of beetle

Maladera weigeli is a species of beetle of the family Scarabaeidae. It is found in Nepal.
