= Maladera lodosi =

Scientific classification
- Kingdom: Animalia
- Phylum: Arthropoda
- Class: Insecta
- Order: Coleoptera
- Suborder: Polyphaga
- Infraorder: Scarabaeiformia
- Family: Scarabaeidae
- Genus: Maladera
- Species: M. lodosi

Binomial name
- Maladera lodosi Baraud, 1975

Species of beetle

Maladera lodosi is a species of beetle of the family Scarabaeidae. It is found in Turkey.
