= Neoserica fasciata =

Scientific classification
- Kingdom: Animalia
- Phylum: Arthropoda
- Clade: Pancrustacea
- Class: Insecta
- Order: Coleoptera
- Suborder: Polyphaga
- Infraorder: Scarabaeiformia
- Family: Scarabaeidae
- Genus: Neoserica
- Species: N. fasciata

Binomial name
- Neoserica fasciata (Moser, 1911)

Synonyms
- Autoserica fasciata Moser, 1911

Species of beetle

Neoserica fasciata is a species of beetle of the family Scarabaeidae. It is found in Malaysia (Sarawak).

== Description ==
Adults reach a length of about 9 mm. The upper surface is dull and the head is black except for the red vertex. The antennae are yellowish-brown. The black pronotum is sparsely punctate and has six faint red spots (two on either side of the middle, two somewhat closer together in front of the anterior margin and one on each side of the lateral margins). The anterior angles have a small group of setae, while the lateral margins are covered with individual setae. The scutellum is black, edged in red. The elytra are brown and punctate-striate, the intervals weakly convex and the lateral margins covered with a few setae. From the middle of the side edges, a wide black band extends towards the seam, reaching it slightly behind the middle, so that the band is directed slightly diagonally backwards.
