= Neoserica parursina =

Scientific classification
- Kingdom: Animalia
- Phylum: Arthropoda
- Class: Insecta
- Order: Coleoptera
- Suborder: Polyphaga
- Infraorder: Scarabaeiformia
- Family: Scarabaeidae
- Genus: Neoserica
- Species: N. parursina

Binomial name
- Neoserica parursina Ahrens, 2003

Species of beetle

Neoserica parursina is a species of beetle of the family Scarabaeidae. It is found in China (Shandong).

== Description ==
Adults reach a length of about 6.5–7.6 mm. They have a reddish brown, oval body. Most of the upper surface has a greenish sheen. They are mostly dull with dense light hairs, interspersed with dense, long, strong, dark hairs. The underside is densely haired.

== Etymology ==
The name of the species is derived from the Greek prefix para and the Latin word ursinus (meaning bear-like) and refers to the dense hairs.
