= Neoserica sandeana =

Scientific classification
- Kingdom: Animalia
- Phylum: Arthropoda
- Class: Insecta
- Order: Coleoptera
- Suborder: Polyphaga
- Infraorder: Scarabaeiformia
- Family: Scarabaeidae
- Genus: Neoserica
- Species: N. sandeana

Binomial name
- Neoserica sandeana Brenske, 1902

Species of beetle

Neoserica sandeana is a species of beetle of the family Scarabaeidae. It is found in the Central African Republic and the Democratic Republic of the Congo.

== Description ==
Adults reach a length of about 10 mm. They have an oval, dull, dark brown body, with a greenish sheen above. The frons is strongly punctate behind the suture. The elytra are striated in rows with punctures alongside, slightly convex, somewhat unpunctate interstices, with minute hairs and white setae.
