= Neoserica fairyqueen =

Scientific classification
- Kingdom: Animalia
- Phylum: Arthropoda
- Class: Insecta
- Order: Coleoptera
- Suborder: Polyphaga
- Infraorder: Scarabaeiformia
- Family: Scarabaeidae
- Genus: Neoserica
- Species: N. fairyqueen

Binomial name
- Neoserica fairyqueen Ahrens, 2022

Species of beetle

Neoserica fairyqueen is a species of beetle of the family Scarabaeidae. It is found in Thailand.

== Description ==
Adults reach a length of about 3.9–4.1 mm. They have a brown, short-oval body. The antennal club, legs, disc of the elytra and posterior half of the pronotum are yellowish brown, while the elytral margins, an anterior and posterior spot as well as a transversal band on the elytra are dark. The dorsal surface is mostly dull and nearly glabrous.

== Etymology ==
The species is named after Fairy Queen, a theater production that premiered in Lucerne (Switzerland) in March 2022, to honour the ensemble which contributed to its success.
