= Neoserica squamuligera =

Scientific classification
- Kingdom: Animalia
- Phylum: Arthropoda
- Clade: Pancrustacea
- Class: Insecta
- Order: Coleoptera
- Suborder: Polyphaga
- Infraorder: Scarabaeiformia
- Family: Scarabaeidae
- Genus: Neoserica
- Species: N. squamuligera

Binomial name
- Neoserica squamuligera Moser, 1915

Species of beetle

Neoserica squamuligera is a species of beetle of the family Scarabaeidae. It is found in the Philippines (Mindanao).

== Description ==
Adults reach a length of about 7 mm. They are dark reddish-brown above and light brown below. The frons is weakly punctate and has a few setae next to the eyes. The antennae are brown. The pronotum is moderately densely covered with minutely bristle-bearing punctures and the slightly curved lateral margins have a few strong setae. The elytra are covered with irregular rows of punctures in the striae, and the punctures reveal have tiny setae. The spaces between are only very slightly curved and almost free of spots, yet the alternating spaces have a longitudinal row of widely spaced white scales.
