= Neoserica fecunda =

Scientific classification
- Kingdom: Animalia
- Phylum: Arthropoda
- Class: Insecta
- Order: Coleoptera
- Suborder: Polyphaga
- Infraorder: Scarabaeiformia
- Family: Scarabaeidae
- Genus: Neoserica
- Species: N. fecunda

Binomial name
- Neoserica fecunda Brenske, 1902

Species of beetle

Neoserica fecunda is a species of beetle of the family Scarabaeidae. It is found in Malawi.

== Description ==
Adults reach a length of about 8–10 mm. They are dark brown, but blackish above, dull and with a silky sheen. There are setae behind the frons and on the vertex. The pronotum is scarcely rounded laterally, straight posteriorly, with strong setae behind the anterior margin and on the lateral margin. The scutellum is large and pointed. The elytra are very finely punctate in rows, densely punctate beside them, the intervals less punctate in the middle. The setae are distinct and the lateral margin is densely setate.
