= Neoserica obesa =

Scientific classification
- Kingdom: Animalia
- Phylum: Arthropoda
- Class: Insecta
- Order: Coleoptera
- Suborder: Polyphaga
- Infraorder: Scarabaeiformia
- Family: Scarabaeidae
- Genus: Neoserica
- Species: N. obesa

Binomial name
- Neoserica obesa (Péringuey, 1892)

Synonyms
- Serica obesa Péringuey, 1892

Species of beetle

Neoserica obesa is a species of beetle of the family Scarabaeidae. It is found in Namibia and South Africa (Northern Cape).

== Description ==
Adults reach a length of about 10 mm. They are chestnut-red, with only a slight fleshy tinge and a very faint metallic sheen. The clypeus is very roughly, although not deeply punctured. The scutellum is very closely punctulate. The elytra are sub-costulate in the anterior part only, punctato-striate, the interstices are plainly and somewhat closely punctured, and there are on each side six rows of somewhat remote, very small whitish hairs. The club of the antennae is flavescent.
