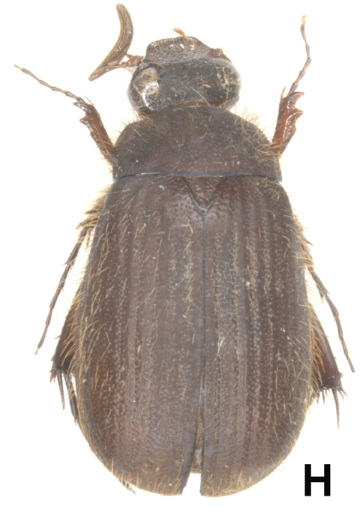

Scientific classification
- Kingdom: Animalia
- Phylum: Arthropoda
- Class: Insecta
- Order: Coleoptera
- Suborder: Polyphaga
- Infraorder: Scarabaeiformia
- Family: Scarabaeidae
- Genus: Neoserica
- Species: N. weishanica

Binomial name
- Neoserica weishanica Ahrens, Fabrizi & Liu, 2014

= Neoserica weishanica =

Species of beetle

Neoserica weishanica is a species of beetle of the family Scarabaeidae. It is found in China (Yunnan).

== Description ==
Adults reach a length of about 9.7 mm. They have a reddish brown, oblong body. The antennal club is yellowish brown, the labroclypeus is shiny and the dorsal surface is dull, with dense and erect setae.

== Etymology ==
The species is named according to its type locality, Weishan mountains.
