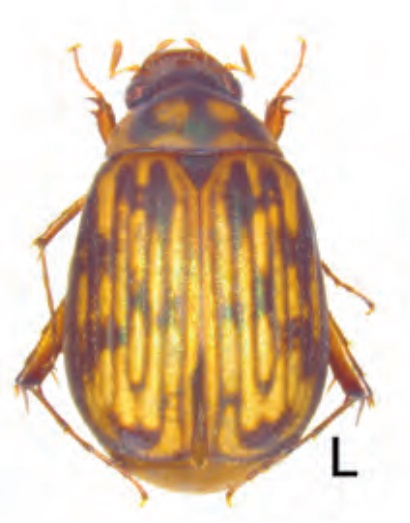

Scientific classification
- Kingdom: Animalia
- Phylum: Arthropoda
- Class: Insecta
- Order: Coleoptera
- Suborder: Polyphaga
- Infraorder: Scarabaeiformia
- Family: Scarabaeidae
- Genus: Neoserica
- Species: N. plebea

Binomial name
- Neoserica plebea Ahrens & Fabrizi, 2016

= Neoserica plebea =

Species of beetle

Neoserica plebea is a species of beetle of the family Scarabaeidae. It is found in Karnataka, India.

== Description ==
Adults reach a length of about 6.6–7.6 mm. They have a yellowish brown, oval body, with the ventral surface slightly darker. The disc of the pronotum (except for two yellow spots besides the middle), scutellum, elytral striae and various small spots on the elytra are all dark with a greenish shine. The dorsal surface is dull and glabrous.

== Etymology ==
The species name is derived from Latin plebeus (meaning simple or ordinary).
