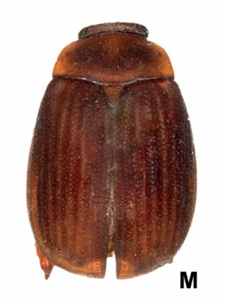

Scientific classification
- Kingdom: Animalia
- Phylum: Arthropoda
- Class: Insecta
- Order: Coleoptera
- Suborder: Polyphaga
- Infraorder: Scarabaeiformia
- Family: Scarabaeidae
- Genus: Neoserica
- Species: N. napoensis

Binomial name
- Neoserica napoensis Ahrens, Fabrizi & Liu, 2019

= Neoserica napoensis =

Species of beetle

Neoserica napoensis is a species of beetle of the family Scarabaeidae. It is found in China (Guangxi).

== Description ==
Adults reach a length of about 5.7 mm. They have a dark reddish brown, oblong body. The antennal club and margins of the pronotum are yellowish brown. The dorsal surface is dull and nearly glabrous and the labroclypeus and anterior two thirds of the frons are shiny.

== Etymology ==
The name of the species refers to the occurrence of the species near Napo.
