= Neoserica obscurifrons =

Scientific classification
- Kingdom: Animalia
- Phylum: Arthropoda
- Clade: Pancrustacea
- Class: Insecta
- Order: Coleoptera
- Suborder: Polyphaga
- Infraorder: Scarabaeiformia
- Family: Scarabaeidae
- Genus: Neoserica
- Species: N. obscurifrons

Binomial name
- Neoserica obscurifrons (Moser, 1916)

Synonyms
- Autoserica obscurifrons Moser, 1916

Species of beetle

Neoserica obscurifrons is a species of beetle of the family Scarabaeidae. It is found in Tanzania.

== Description ==
Adults reach a length of about 9 mm. They are dull, dark brown above and lighter below. The frons is finely punctate, with setae in the posterior part and the antennae are yellowish-brown. The pronotum is quite densely punctate, the punctures with tiny setae. The lateral margins are setate. The elytra are slightly furrowed, and these furrows are densely punctate. On the weakly convex intervals, the punctures are very widely spaced. All the punctures have tiny setae and a few have more distinct setae.
