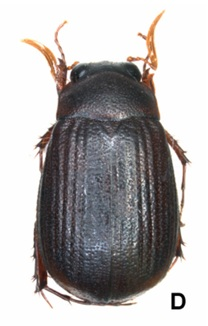

Scientific classification
- Kingdom: Animalia
- Phylum: Arthropoda
- Class: Insecta
- Order: Coleoptera
- Suborder: Polyphaga
- Infraorder: Scarabaeiformia
- Family: Scarabaeidae
- Genus: Neoserica
- Species: N. dianae

Binomial name
- Neoserica dianae Ahrens, Fabrizi & Liu, 2019

= Neoserica dianae =

Species of beetle

Neoserica dianae is a species of beetle of the family Scarabaeidae. It is found in China (Henan, Shaanxi).

== Description ==
Adults reach a length of about 7.8–8.4 mm. They have a dark brown, oblong body. The antennal club is yellowish brown, the dorsal surface is dull or weakly shiny and nearly glabrous and the labroclypeus is shiny.

== Etymology ==
The species is dedicated to Diana Carteni (Velletri, Italy).
