= Neoserica plasoni =

Scientific classification
- Kingdom: Animalia
- Phylum: Arthropoda
- Class: Insecta
- Order: Coleoptera
- Suborder: Polyphaga
- Infraorder: Scarabaeiformia
- Family: Scarabaeidae
- Genus: Neoserica
- Species: N. plasoni

Binomial name
- Neoserica plasoni Brenske, 1899

Species of beetle

Neoserica plasoni is a species of beetle of the family Scarabaeidae. It is found in Indonesia (Java).

== Description ==
Adults reach a length of about 11 mm. They have a strikingly broad, black, dull body, without a silky sheen and not opalescent, only the tibiae are shiny. The head is narrow and the frons is densely covered with long setae. The pronotum is narrow anteriorly, the anterior angles not as strongly projecting, strongly rounded laterally with right-angled posterior angles, densely setate anteriorly and laterally. The elytra are narrowly punctate in the rows, with broad interstices.
