= Neoserica sudanensis =

Scientific classification
- Kingdom: Animalia
- Phylum: Arthropoda
- Class: Insecta
- Order: Coleoptera
- Suborder: Polyphaga
- Infraorder: Scarabaeiformia
- Family: Scarabaeidae
- Genus: Neoserica
- Species: N. sudanensis

Binomial name
- Neoserica sudanensis (Frey, 1970)

Synonyms
- Autoserica sudanensis Frey, 1971

Species of beetle

Neoserica sudanensis is a species of beetle of the family Scarabaeidae. It is found in Sudan.

== Description ==
Adults reach a length of about 6–7 mm. The upper and lower surfaces are reddish-yellow and the head is glossy. The pronotum is faintly glossy and the elytra glossy and opalescent. The sides of the pronotum and elytra are sparsely fringed. The surface of the pronotum is finely, shallowly, and rather densely punctate. The scutellum is sparsely punctured and the elytra have rows of punctures, with the spaces between them flatly convex and without punctures.
