= Neoserica sexflabellata =

Scientific classification
- Kingdom: Animalia
- Phylum: Arthropoda
- Class: Insecta
- Order: Coleoptera
- Suborder: Polyphaga
- Infraorder: Scarabaeiformia
- Family: Scarabaeidae
- Genus: Neoserica
- Species: N. sexflabellata

Binomial name
- Neoserica sexflabellata (Frey, 1960)

Synonyms
- Autoserica sexflabellata Frey, 1960

Species of beetle

Neoserica sexflabellata is a species of beetle of the family Scarabaeidae. It is found in Guinea.

== Description ==
Adults reach a length of about 7–8 mm. The upper and lower surfaces are blackish-brown and slightly glossy. The antennae are yellowish-brown. The pronotum is finely and densely punctate, while the elytra are rather finely and more shallowly punctate than the pronotum. The punctures are spaced at twice their diameter. The elytra are also finely striate.
