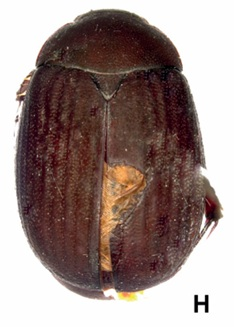

Scientific classification
- Kingdom: Animalia
- Phylum: Arthropoda
- Class: Insecta
- Order: Coleoptera
- Suborder: Polyphaga
- Infraorder: Scarabaeiformia
- Family: Scarabaeidae
- Genus: Neoserica
- Species: N. yanshanica

Binomial name
- Neoserica yanshanica Ahrens, Fabrizi & Liu, 2019

= Neoserica yanshanica =

Species of beetle

Neoserica yanshanica is a species of beetle of the family Scarabaeidae. It is found in China (Guangxi).

== Description ==
Adults reach a length of about 9 mm. They have a dark brown, oval body. The antennal club is yellowish brown and the dorsal surface is dull and nearly glabrous.

== Etymology ==
The species is named after the type locality, Yanshan mountain.
