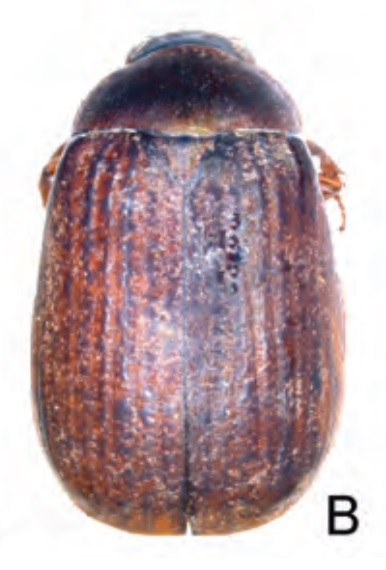

Scientific classification
- Kingdom: Animalia
- Phylum: Arthropoda
- Class: Insecta
- Order: Coleoptera
- Suborder: Polyphaga
- Infraorder: Scarabaeiformia
- Family: Scarabaeidae
- Genus: Neoserica
- Species: N. nilgiriana

Binomial name
- Neoserica nilgiriana Ahrens & Fabrizi, 2016

= Neoserica nilgiriana =

Species of beetle

Neoserica nilgiriana is a species of beetle of the family Scarabaeidae. It is found in India (Nilgiri Hills).

== Description ==
Adults reach a length of about 11.7–12.1 mm. They have a dark brown, oblong body. The antennal club and posterior legs are yellowish brown and the dorsal surface is dull and sparsely setose.

== Etymology ==
The species name refers to its occurrence in the Nilgiri Hills.
