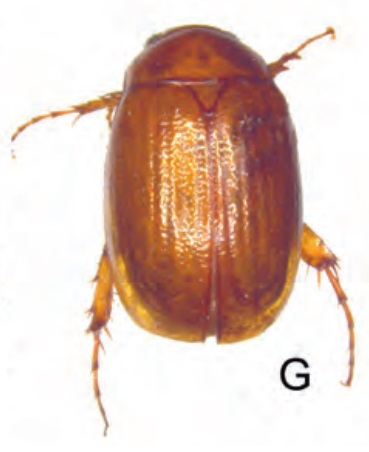

Scientific classification
- Kingdom: Animalia
- Phylum: Arthropoda
- Class: Insecta
- Order: Coleoptera
- Suborder: Polyphaga
- Infraorder: Scarabaeiformia
- Family: Scarabaeidae
- Genus: Neoserica
- Species: N. shillongensis

Binomial name
- Neoserica shillongensis Ahrens & Fabrizi, 2016

= Neoserica shillongensis =

Species of beetle

Neoserica shillongensis is a species of beetle of the family Scarabaeidae. It is found in India (Assam).

== Description ==
Adults reach a length of about 5.1–5.8 mm. They have a yellowish brown, oval body. The dorsal surface is shiny and glabrous.

== Etymology ==
The species is named for its type locality, Shillong.
