= Neoserica gabonica =

Scientific classification
- Kingdom: Animalia
- Phylum: Arthropoda
- Class: Insecta
- Order: Coleoptera
- Suborder: Polyphaga
- Infraorder: Scarabaeiformia
- Family: Scarabaeidae
- Genus: Neoserica
- Species: N. gabonica

Binomial name
- Neoserica gabonica (Brenske, 1902)

Synonyms
- Autoserica gabonica Brenske, 1902

Species of beetle

Neoserica gabonica is a species of beetle of the family Scarabaeidae. It is found in Gabon.

== Description ==
Adults reach a length of about 7 mm. They have a brown, tomentose, egg-shaped body, with a dark greenish sheen. The pronotum is densely and finely punctate and strongly setate. The elytra have fine rows of punctures and are densely and equally finely punctate.
