= Neoserica butuana =

Scientific classification
- Kingdom: Animalia
- Phylum: Arthropoda
- Clade: Pancrustacea
- Class: Insecta
- Order: Coleoptera
- Suborder: Polyphaga
- Infraorder: Scarabaeiformia
- Family: Scarabaeidae
- Genus: Neoserica
- Species: N. butuana

Binomial name
- Neoserica butuana Moser, 1922

Species of beetle

Neoserica butuana is a species of beetle of the family Scarabaeidae. It is found in the Philippines (Mindanao).

== Description ==
Adults reach a length of about 11 mm. They have an blackish-brown, opaque body. The head is sparsely punctate and the antennae are reddish-yellow. The pronotum is subtly punctate, with minute setae and the elytra are slightly striated and covered with minute setae.
