= Neoserica lucifuga =

Scientific classification
- Kingdom: Animalia
- Phylum: Arthropoda
- Class: Insecta
- Order: Coleoptera
- Suborder: Polyphaga
- Infraorder: Scarabaeiformia
- Family: Scarabaeidae
- Genus: Neoserica
- Species: N. lucifuga

Binomial name
- Neoserica lucifuga Brenske, 1899

Species of beetle

Neoserica lucifuga is a species of beetle of the family Scarabaeidae. It is found in the Philippines (Mindanao).

== Description ==
Adults reach a length of about 8.5–9 mm. They have a short, egg-shaped, dull body. They are opalescent, dark, cherry-red brown above, and brown below, with only the tibiae and legs shiny. The clypeus is short and broad, distinctly margined anteriorly, dull wrinkled-punctate with weak longitudinal elevation. The pronotum is short, the anterior margin projecting forward in the middle, the sides slightly rounded, strongly widened posteriorly with broadly rounded hind angles. The elytra are irregularly densely punctate in the broad striae, with the intervals narrow and rib-like. The pygidium is pointed and densely covered with rather coarse punctures.
