= Neoserica padangensis =

Scientific classification
- Kingdom: Animalia
- Phylum: Arthropoda
- Clade: Pancrustacea
- Class: Insecta
- Order: Coleoptera
- Suborder: Polyphaga
- Infraorder: Scarabaeiformia
- Family: Scarabaeidae
- Genus: Neoserica
- Species: N. padangensis

Binomial name
- Neoserica padangensis Moser, 1916

Species of beetle

Neoserica padangensis is a species of beetle of the family Scarabaeidae. It is found in Indonesia (Sumatra).

== Description ==
Adults reach a length of about 6.5 mm. The head is quite finely punctate, the frons is dull and the antennae are yellowish-brown. The pronotum is moderately densely covered with minutely bristle-bearing punctures. On the elytra, the intervals are flat and rather sparsely covered with punctures with minute setae.
