= Neoserica delagoana =

Scientific classification
- Kingdom: Animalia
- Phylum: Arthropoda
- Class: Insecta
- Order: Coleoptera
- Suborder: Polyphaga
- Infraorder: Scarabaeiformia
- Family: Scarabaeidae
- Genus: Neoserica
- Species: N. delagoana

Binomial name
- Neoserica delagoana (Brenske, 1901)

Synonyms
- Lepiserica delagoana Brenske, 1901; Autoserica delagoana

Species of beetle

Neoserica delagoana is a species of beetle of the family Scarabaeidae. It is found in Mozambique.

== Description ==
Adults reach a length of about 9–10 mm. They have a robust and thick, very opaque, dark body, with a green sheen above. They are brown below, and only the tibia and tarsi are shining. The scutellum is densely punctate and the striae of the elytra have a row of fine punctures, the interspaces broad, quite flat, very sparsely punctate, with a few darker hairs and darker lines which, however, are not broken up into spots, and here the white, stronger, seriate bristles are distinctly seen.
