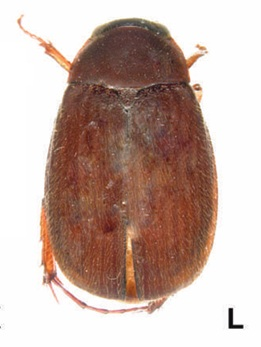

Scientific classification
- Kingdom: Animalia
- Phylum: Arthropoda
- Class: Insecta
- Order: Coleoptera
- Suborder: Polyphaga
- Infraorder: Scarabaeiformia
- Family: Scarabaeidae
- Genus: Neoserica
- Species: N. chayuensis

Binomial name
- Neoserica chayuensis Liu & Ahrens, 2014

= Neoserica chayuensis =

Species of beetle

Neoserica chayuensis is a species of beetle of the family Scarabaeidae. It is found in China (Xizang).

== Description ==
Adults reach a length of about 8.9–10.5 mm. They have an oval body. The dorsal and ventral surface are dull and dark brown, the legs are reddish brown and the antennae are yellow. The dorsal surface has yellowish, short and fine, dense setae.

== Etymology ==
The species is named after the type locality, Chayu.
