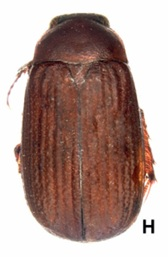

Scientific classification
- Kingdom: Animalia
- Phylum: Arthropoda
- Class: Insecta
- Order: Coleoptera
- Suborder: Polyphaga
- Infraorder: Scarabaeiformia
- Family: Scarabaeidae
- Genus: Neoserica
- Species: N. qingyinica

Binomial name
- Neoserica qingyinica Ahrens, Fabrizi & Liu, 2019

= Neoserica qingyinica =

Species of beetle

Neoserica qingyinica is a species of beetle of the family Scarabaeidae. It is found in China (Sichuan).

== Description ==
Adults reach a length of about 9.2–9.9 mm. They have a dark brown, oblong body. The antennal club is yellowish brown. The dorsal surface is dull or weakly shiny and nearly glabrous and the labroclypeus is moderately shiny.

== Etymology ==
The species is named after the type locality, Qingyin.
