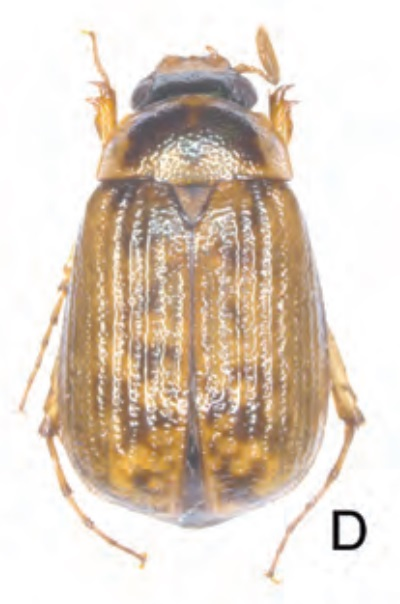

Scientific classification
- Kingdom: Animalia
- Phylum: Arthropoda
- Clade: Pancrustacea
- Class: Insecta
- Order: Coleoptera
- Suborder: Polyphaga
- Infraorder: Scarabaeiformia
- Family: Scarabaeidae
- Genus: Neoserica
- Species: N. variegata

Binomial name
- Neoserica variegata Moser, 1915

= Neoserica variegata =

Species of beetle

Neoserica variegata is a species of beetle of the family Scarabaeidae. It is found in north-eastern India.

== Description ==
Adults reach a length of about 6.1 mm. They have a yellowish brown, oval body. The ventral surface, disc of the pronotum and small dots on the elytra are all dark. The dorsal surface is shiny and glabrous.
