= Neoserica bataviana =

Scientific classification
- Kingdom: Animalia
- Phylum: Arthropoda
- Clade: Pancrustacea
- Class: Insecta
- Order: Coleoptera
- Suborder: Polyphaga
- Infraorder: Scarabaeiformia
- Family: Scarabaeidae
- Genus: Neoserica
- Species: N. bataviana

Binomial name
- Neoserica bataviana Moser, 1920

Species of beetle

Neoserica bataviana is a species of beetle of the family Scarabaeidae. It is found in Indonesia (Java).

== Description ==
Adults reach a length of about 10.5 mm. They are opaque, blackish-brown above and brown below. The antennae reddish-testaceous.
