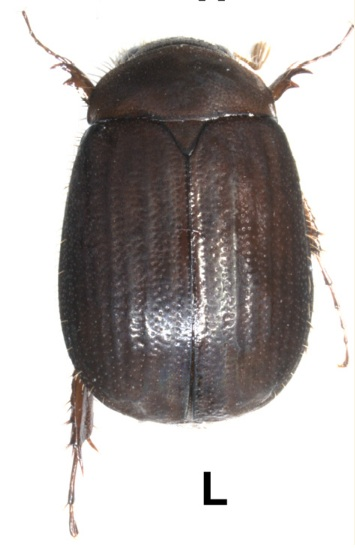

Scientific classification
- Kingdom: Animalia
- Phylum: Arthropoda
- Class: Insecta
- Order: Coleoptera
- Suborder: Polyphaga
- Infraorder: Scarabaeiformia
- Family: Scarabaeidae
- Genus: Neoserica
- Species: N. mengi

Binomial name
- Neoserica mengi Liu, Fabrizi, Bai, Yang & Ahrens, 2014

= Neoserica mengi =

Species of beetle

Neoserica mengi is a species of beetle of the family Scarabaeidae. It is found in China (Yunnan, Zhejiang) and Vietnam.

== Description ==
Adults reach a length of about 5.2–5.9 mm. They have a dark reddish brown, oval body. The antennal club is yellowish brown and the dorsal surface is dull and nearly glabrous, while the labroclypeus and anterior half of the frons are shiny.

== Etymology ==
The species is named after one of the collectors of the type series, L. Meng.
