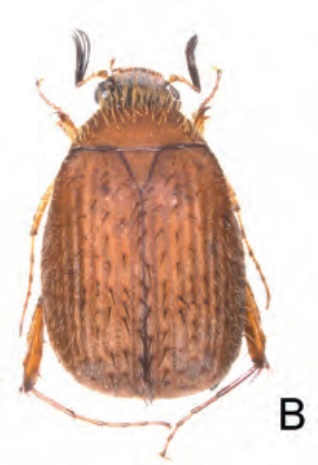

Scientific classification
- Kingdom: Animalia
- Phylum: Arthropoda
- Class: Insecta
- Order: Coleoptera
- Suborder: Polyphaga
- Infraorder: Scarabaeiformia
- Family: Scarabaeidae
- Genus: Neoserica
- Species: N. arunachalana

Binomial name
- Neoserica arunachalana Ahrens & Fabrizi, 2009

= Neoserica arunachalana =

Species of beetle

Neoserica arunachalana is a species of beetle of the family Scarabaeidae. It is found in India (Arunachal Pradesh).

== Description ==
Adults reach a length of about 6.9-7.4 mm. They have a reddish brown, oval body. The dorsal surface is mostly dull and densely covered with long and short adjacent setae.

== Etymology ==
The species name refers to its occurrence in the Arunachal province.
