= Neoserica tristis =

Scientific classification
- Kingdom: Animalia
- Phylum: Arthropoda
- Class: Insecta
- Order: Coleoptera
- Suborder: Polyphaga
- Infraorder: Scarabaeiformia
- Family: Scarabaeidae
- Genus: Neoserica
- Species: N. tristis

Binomial name
- Neoserica tristis (Frey, 1970)

Synonyms
- Autoserica tristis Frey, 1970

Species of beetle

Neoserica tristis is a species of beetle of the family Scarabaeidae. It is found in Ivory Coast.

== Description ==
Adults reach a length of about 7–8 mm. The upper surface is dark brown and dull. The clypeus is shiny. The underside is moderately shiny and brown, and the antennae are yellow. There are tiny bristles in the punctures of the pronotum and elytra and somewhat longer bristles are very scattered on the elytra. The margins of the pronotum and elytra are fringed with the same bristles.
