= Neoserica femoralis =

Scientific classification
- Kingdom: Animalia
- Phylum: Arthropoda
- Clade: Pancrustacea
- Class: Insecta
- Order: Coleoptera
- Suborder: Polyphaga
- Infraorder: Scarabaeiformia
- Family: Scarabaeidae
- Genus: Neoserica
- Species: N. femoralis

Binomial name
- Neoserica femoralis Moser, 1911

Species of beetle

Neoserica femoralis is a species of beetle of the family Scarabaeidae. It is found in Brunei.

== Description ==
Adults reach a length of about 5 mm. The upper surface is dull and yellowish-brown with indistinct darker spots. The frons is mostly green and the antennae are brown. The pronotum is moderately densely punctate with a few setae on the sides. The elytra are irregularly punctate and striate, the intervals are not marked, and the surfaces have tiny setae.
