= Neoserica churachandpurensis =

Scientific classification
- Kingdom: Animalia
- Phylum: Arthropoda
- Class: Insecta
- Order: Coleoptera
- Suborder: Polyphaga
- Infraorder: Scarabaeiformia
- Family: Scarabaeidae
- Genus: Neoserica
- Species: N. churachandpurensis

Binomial name
- Neoserica churachandpurensis Gupta, Bhunia, Ahrens & Chandra, 2025

Species of beetle

Neoserica churachandpurensis is a species of beetle of the family Scarabaeidae. It is found in India (Manipur).

== Description ==
Adults reach a length of about 6.4 mm. They have an unicolored light reddish brown, oval body. The entire dorsal surface is shiny and glabrous, except for a few setae on the head.

== Etymology ==
The species is named after its type locality.
