= Neoserica chetaoensis =

Scientific classification
- Kingdom: Animalia
- Phylum: Arthropoda
- Class: Insecta
- Order: Coleoptera
- Suborder: Polyphaga
- Infraorder: Scarabaeiformia
- Family: Scarabaeidae
- Genus: Neoserica
- Species: N. chetaoensis

Binomial name
- Neoserica chetaoensis Ahrens & Pham, 2021

Species of beetle

Neoserica chetaoensis is a species of beetle of the family Scarabaeidae. It is found in Thailand and Vietnam.

== Description ==
Adults reach a length of about 5.6–6 mm. They have a yellowish brown, oval body. The elytra are dark brown and the antennal club is yellowish. The dorsal surface is mostly dull and nearly glabrous.

== Etymology ==
The species is named after its type locality, Che Tao.
