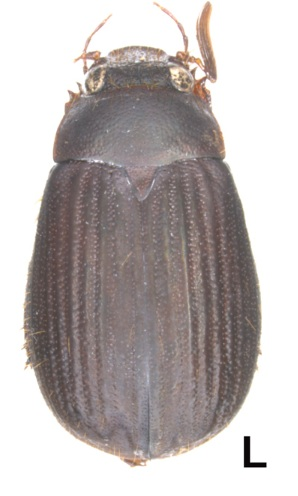

Scientific classification
- Kingdom: Animalia
- Phylum: Arthropoda
- Class: Insecta
- Order: Coleoptera
- Suborder: Polyphaga
- Infraorder: Scarabaeiformia
- Family: Scarabaeidae
- Genus: Neoserica
- Species: N. takakuwai

Binomial name
- Neoserica takakuwai Ahrens, Fabrizi & Liu, 2014

= Neoserica takakuwai =

Species of beetle

Neoserica takakuwai is a species of beetle of the family Scarabaeidae. It is found in Laos.

== Description ==
Adults reach a length of about 8.5–9.3 mm. They have a dark brown, oblong body. The ventral surface and legs are reddish brown and the antennal club is yellowish brown. The dorsal surface is dull and nearly glabrous, except for a few long setae on the head.

== Etymology ==
The species is named after the first collector of this species, M. Takakuwa.
