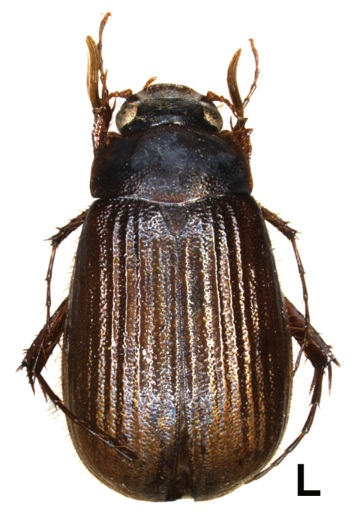

Scientific classification
- Kingdom: Animalia
- Phylum: Arthropoda
- Class: Insecta
- Order: Coleoptera
- Suborder: Polyphaga
- Infraorder: Scarabaeiformia
- Family: Scarabaeidae
- Genus: Neoserica
- Species: N. gaoligongshanica

Binomial name
- Neoserica gaoligongshanica Ahrens, Fabrizi & Liu, 2014

= Neoserica gaoligongshanica =

Species of beetle

Neoserica gaoligongshanica is a species of beetle of the family Scarabaeidae. It is found in China (Yunnan).

== Description ==
Adults reach a length of about 10.2–11.3 mm. They have a dark reddish brown, oblong body. The antennal club is yellowish brown. The dorsal surface is moderately shiny (except for the dull pronotum) and nearly glabrous, except for a few long setae on the head and along the sides of the elytra.

== Etymology ==
The species is named according its type locality, Gaoligongshan.
