= Neoserica ciliatipennis =

Scientific classification
- Kingdom: Animalia
- Phylum: Arthropoda
- Clade: Pancrustacea
- Class: Insecta
- Order: Coleoptera
- Suborder: Polyphaga
- Infraorder: Scarabaeiformia
- Family: Scarabaeidae
- Genus: Neoserica
- Species: N. ciliatipennis

Binomial name
- Neoserica ciliatipennis Moser, 1924

Species of beetle

Neoserica ciliatipennis is a species of beetle of the family Scarabaeidae. It is found in Tanzania.

== Description ==
Adults reach a length of about 8 mm. They are rufous and opaque and the antennae are reddish-yellow. The pronotum is finely punctate, with a few setae.
