= Neoserica axelkalliesi =

Scientific classification
- Kingdom: Animalia
- Phylum: Arthropoda
- Class: Insecta
- Order: Coleoptera
- Suborder: Polyphaga
- Infraorder: Scarabaeiformia
- Family: Scarabaeidae
- Genus: Neoserica
- Species: N. axelkalliesi

Binomial name
- Neoserica axelkalliesi Ahrens & Pham, 2021

Species of beetle

Neoserica axelkalliesi is a species of beetle of the family Scarabaeidae. It is found in Vietnam.

== Description ==
Adults reach a length of about 6.3 mm. They have a dark brown, oblong body. The antennal club is yellowish brown and the dorsal surface is dull and nearly glabrous, except for the labroclypeus and anterior two thirds of the frons, which are shiny.

== Etymology ==
The species is named after its collector, Axel Kallies.
