= Neoserica multifoliata =

Scientific classification
- Kingdom: Animalia
- Phylum: Arthropoda
- Clade: Pancrustacea
- Class: Insecta
- Order: Coleoptera
- Suborder: Polyphaga
- Infraorder: Scarabaeiformia
- Family: Scarabaeidae
- Genus: Neoserica
- Species: N. multifoliata

Binomial name
- Neoserica multifoliata Moser, 1920

Species of beetle

Neoserica multifoliata is a species of beetle of the family Scarabaeidae. It is found in Myanmar.

== Description ==
Adults reach a length of about 9.5 mm. They are rufous and opaque. The antennae are reddish-yellow. The pronotum is densely but subtly punctate and the elytra are seriate-punctate, with the interstices slightly convex and moderately densely punctate.
