= Neoserica umbugwensis =

Scientific classification
- Kingdom: Animalia
- Phylum: Arthropoda
- Clade: Pancrustacea
- Class: Insecta
- Order: Coleoptera
- Suborder: Polyphaga
- Infraorder: Scarabaeiformia
- Family: Scarabaeidae
- Genus: Neoserica
- Species: N. umbugwensis

Binomial name
- Neoserica umbugwensis (Moser, 1917)

Synonyms
- Autoserica umbugwensis Moser, 1917

Species of beetle

Neoserica umbugwensis is a species of beetle of the family Scarabaeidae. It is found in Tanzania.

== Description ==
Adults reach a length of about 6 mm. They are brown, with a silky sheen. The frons is dark, sparsely punctate, and has a few setae beside the eyes. The antennae are yellowish-brown. The pronotum is moderately densely punctured and the elytra have rows of punctures, with the spaces between them widely punctate, the punctures with tiny setae (some of which are somewhat larger).
