= Neoserica bannapensis =

Scientific classification
- Kingdom: Animalia
- Phylum: Arthropoda
- Class: Insecta
- Order: Coleoptera
- Suborder: Polyphaga
- Infraorder: Scarabaeiformia
- Family: Scarabaeidae
- Genus: Neoserica
- Species: N. bannapensis

Binomial name
- Neoserica bannapensis Ahrens, 2003

Species of beetle

Neoserica bannapensis is a species of beetle of the family Scarabaeidae. It is found in Laos.

== Description ==
Adults reach a length of about 6.7 mm. They have a reddish-brown, oval body. The forehead, the center of the anterior margin of the pronotum, as well as the sides and sutural interval of the elytra are dark, partly with a greenish tinge. They are mostly dull with dense light hairs, interspersed with dense, long, strong, dark hairs. The underside is densely haired.

== Etymology ==
The species is named after the type locality, Ban Nape.
