= Neoserica farsilis =

Scientific classification
- Kingdom: Animalia
- Phylum: Arthropoda
- Class: Insecta
- Order: Coleoptera
- Suborder: Polyphaga
- Infraorder: Scarabaeiformia
- Family: Scarabaeidae
- Genus: Neoserica
- Species: N. farsilis

Binomial name
- Neoserica farsilis (Brenske, 1901)

Synonyms
- Lepiserica farsilis Brenske, 1901; Autoserica farsilis

Species of beetle

Neoserica farsilis is a species of beetle of the family Scarabaeidae. It is found in Tanzania.

== Description ==
Adults reach a length of about 10.5 mm. They are robustly built, and have a brownish-red colour with a greenish-dark sheen. They are dull and opalescent. The pronotum is only slightly rounded at the sides, not projected anteriorly, with distinct setae behind the anterior margin, the same being weak at the lateral margin. The scutellum is large, pointed, covered with the same hairs as the base of the elytra. The elytra are punctate in rows. The spaces between the setae are of unequal width. The first one next to the seam is wide, the second narrow, and so on, alternating. All are sparsely dotted, the narrow ones are somewhat more convex and black-spotted. The setae are very distinct.
