= Neoserica lenangensis =

Scientific classification
- Kingdom: Animalia
- Phylum: Arthropoda
- Class: Insecta
- Order: Coleoptera
- Suborder: Polyphaga
- Infraorder: Scarabaeiformia
- Family: Scarabaeidae
- Genus: Neoserica
- Species: N. lenangensis

Binomial name
- Neoserica lenangensis Ahrens & Fabrizi, 2009

Species of beetle

Neoserica lenangensis is a species of beetle of the family Scarabaeidae. It is found in north-eastern India (western Arunachal Pradesh) and China (Xizang).

== Description ==
Adults reach a length of about 11.2 mm. They have a dark brown, oblong body. The legs are reddish brown and the antennal club is yellowish brown. The dorsal surface is mostly dull and nearly glabrous.

== Etymology ==
The species name refers to its type locality, Lenang.
