= Neoserica brastagiensis =

Scientific classification
- Kingdom: Animalia
- Phylum: Arthropoda
- Clade: Pancrustacea
- Class: Insecta
- Order: Coleoptera
- Suborder: Polyphaga
- Infraorder: Scarabaeiformia
- Family: Scarabaeidae
- Genus: Neoserica
- Species: N. brastagiensis

Binomial name
- Neoserica brastagiensis Moser, 1922

Species of beetle

Neoserica brastagiensis is a species of beetle of the family Scarabaeidae. It is found in Indonesia (Sumatra).

== Description ==
Adults reach a length of about 9 mm. They have an chestnut-brown, shiny body. The head is densely punctate and the antennae are tawny. The pronotum is rather densely punctate and the elytra are seriate-punctate, with the interstices slightly convex and densely punctate in the middle, while the sides are setose.
