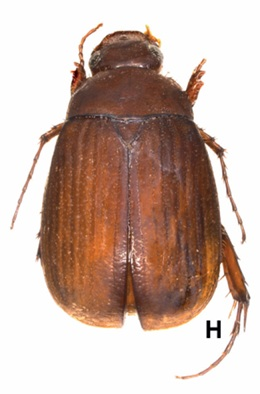

Scientific classification
- Kingdom: Animalia
- Phylum: Arthropoda
- Class: Insecta
- Order: Coleoptera
- Suborder: Polyphaga
- Infraorder: Scarabaeiformia
- Family: Scarabaeidae
- Genus: Neoserica
- Species: N. yulongensis

Binomial name
- Neoserica yulongensis Ahrens, Fabrizi & Liu, 2019

= Neoserica yulongensis =

Species of beetle

Neoserica yulongensis is a species of beetle of the family Scarabaeidae. It is found in China (Gansu, Guangxi, Sichuan, Yunnan).

== Description ==
Adults reach a length of about 8.4–10.1 mm. They have a reddish brown, oblong body. The antennal club is yellowish brown, the dorsal surface is dull and nearly glabrous and the anterior labroclypeus is shiny.

== Etymology ==
The species is named after its occurrence in the Yulong Mountains.
