= Neoserica adumana =

Scientific classification
- Kingdom: Animalia
- Phylum: Arthropoda
- Class: Insecta
- Order: Coleoptera
- Suborder: Polyphaga
- Infraorder: Scarabaeiformia
- Family: Scarabaeidae
- Genus: Neoserica
- Species: N. adumana

Binomial name
- Neoserica adumana (Brenske, 1902)

Synonyms
- Autoserica adumana Brenske, 1902

Species of beetle

Neoserica adumana is a species of beetle of the family Scarabaeidae. It is found in Cameroon.

== Description ==
Adults reach a length of about 8.3 mm. They have a reddish-brown, dull, somewhat opalescent, oval body.
