= Neoserica kannegieteri =

Scientific classification
- Kingdom: Animalia
- Phylum: Arthropoda
- Clade: Pancrustacea
- Class: Insecta
- Order: Coleoptera
- Suborder: Polyphaga
- Infraorder: Scarabaeiformia
- Family: Scarabaeidae
- Genus: Neoserica
- Species: N. kannegieteri

Binomial name
- Neoserica kannegieteri Moser, 1915

Species of beetle

Neoserica kannegieteri is a species of beetle of the family Scarabaeidae. It is found in Indonesia (Sumatra).

== Description ==
Adults reach a length of about 9 mm. They are dull and black or blackish-brown above, and light brown below. The frons is covered with a few setae and is mostly dull, but narrowly shiny behind the clypeus suture. The antennae are yellowish-brown. The pronotum has a moderately dense punctation and the lateral margins are setate. The elytra are irregularly punctate in the striae, while the shallowly convex intervals are almost unpunctate.
