= Neoserica perakensis =

Scientific classification
- Kingdom: Animalia
- Phylum: Arthropoda
- Clade: Pancrustacea
- Class: Insecta
- Order: Coleoptera
- Suborder: Polyphaga
- Infraorder: Scarabaeiformia
- Family: Scarabaeidae
- Genus: Neoserica
- Species: N. perakensis

Binomial name
- Neoserica perakensis Moser, 1915

Species of beetle

Neoserica perakensis is a species of beetle of the family Scarabaeidae. It is found in Malaysia.

== Description ==
Adults reach a length of about 9 mm. They are dull and blackish-brown with a slightly silky sheen above, but brown below. The head is strongly punctate and the antennae are yellowish-brown. The pronotum is moderately densely covered with minutely bristle-bearing punctures and the lateral margins have erect, strong setae. The elytra are punctate in rows within the striae, and the weak ribs have irregular punctation and have an unpunctate stripe in the middle.
