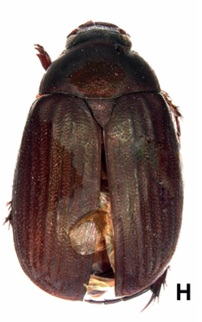

Scientific classification
- Kingdom: Animalia
- Phylum: Arthropoda
- Class: Insecta
- Order: Coleoptera
- Suborder: Polyphaga
- Infraorder: Scarabaeiformia
- Family: Scarabaeidae
- Genus: Neoserica
- Species: N. dilatipennis

Binomial name
- Neoserica dilatipennis Ahrens, Fabrizi & Liu, 2019

= Neoserica dilatipennis =

Species of beetle

Neoserica dilatipennis is a species of beetle of the family Scarabaeidae. It is found in China (Yunnan).

== Description ==
Adults reach a length of about 9.8 mm. They have a dark brown, oval body. The antennal club is yellowish brown. The dorsal surface is dull and nearly glabrous.

== Etymology ==
The species name is derived from the combined Latin words dilatus (meaning widened) and penna (meaning wing), with reference to its body shape.
