= Neoserica debasriae =

Scientific classification
- Kingdom: Animalia
- Phylum: Arthropoda
- Class: Insecta
- Order: Coleoptera
- Suborder: Polyphaga
- Infraorder: Scarabaeiformia
- Family: Scarabaeidae
- Genus: Neoserica
- Species: N. debasriae

Binomial name
- Neoserica debasriae Bhunia, Gupta, Chandra & Ahrens, 2022

Species of beetle

Neoserica debasriae is a species of beetle of the family Scarabaeidae. It is found in India (Madhya Pradesh).

== Description ==
Adults reach a length of about 5.7–5.8 mm. They have an oblong-oval body. The dorsal surface is dark reddish brown and shiny, while the ventral surface is dark reddish-brown and dull. The head is moderately shiny and the surface is glabrous, except for a few single setae.

== Etymology ==
The species is dedicated to the late mother-in-law of one of the authors, Mrs. Debasri Datta.
