= Neoserica vicina =

Scientific classification
- Kingdom: Animalia
- Phylum: Arthropoda
- Clade: Pancrustacea
- Class: Insecta
- Order: Coleoptera
- Suborder: Polyphaga
- Infraorder: Scarabaeiformia
- Family: Scarabaeidae
- Genus: Neoserica
- Species: N. vicina

Binomial name
- Neoserica vicina Moser, 1915

Species of beetle

Neoserica vicina is a species of beetle of the family Scarabaeidae. It is found in Indonesia (Kalimantan).

== Description ==
Adults reach a length of about 10.5 mm. They are dull, blackish-brown above and reddish-brown below. The frons is densely tomentose and scattered setae are found next to the eyes. The antennae are yellowish-brown. The elytra have rows of punctures, with the intervals only very weakly convex and quite extensively covered with minute setate punctures. Scattered, somewhat larger setae are found next to the sides of the elytra.
