= Neoserica mombassana =

Scientific classification
- Kingdom: Animalia
- Phylum: Arthropoda
- Class: Insecta
- Order: Coleoptera
- Suborder: Polyphaga
- Infraorder: Scarabaeiformia
- Family: Scarabaeidae
- Genus: Neoserica
- Species: N. mombassana

Binomial name
- Neoserica mombassana (Brenske, 1902)

Synonyms
- Autoserica mombassana Brenske, 1902

Species of beetle

Neoserica mombassana is a species of beetle of the family Scarabaeidae. It is found in Kenya.

== Description ==
They have a brown, dull, slightly opalescent, oblong-oval body. The elytra are punctate in rows.
