= Neoserica fraterna =

Scientific classification
- Kingdom: Animalia
- Phylum: Arthropoda
- Class: Insecta
- Order: Coleoptera
- Suborder: Polyphaga
- Infraorder: Scarabaeiformia
- Family: Scarabaeidae
- Genus: Neoserica
- Species: N. fraterna

Binomial name
- Neoserica fraterna Brenske, 1902

Species of beetle

Neoserica fraterna is a species of beetle of the family Scarabaeidae. It is found in Malawi.

== Description ==
Adults reach a length of about 8.5 mm. They have a rounded-oval, brown (but black above) body. They are strongly tomentose and opalescent. The pronotum is only slightly rounded at the sides. The scutellum is broad and pointed. The elytra are punctate-striate with widely spaced punctate intervals, which are flat and not very distinct, so that the elytra appear almost uniformly punctate. At the base are fine whitish scale-like hairs, next to the intervals with scattered white setae. There are very minute hairs in the punctations.
