= Neoserica felschei =

Scientific classification
- Kingdom: Animalia
- Phylum: Arthropoda
- Class: Insecta
- Order: Coleoptera
- Suborder: Polyphaga
- Infraorder: Scarabaeiformia
- Family: Scarabaeidae
- Genus: Neoserica
- Species: N. felschei

Binomial name
- Neoserica felschei Brenske, 1899

Species of beetle

Neoserica felschei is a species of beetle of the family Scarabaeidae. It is found in Indonesia (Java).

== Description ==
Adults reach a length of about 8 mm. They have a narrow, oblong-oval, dull, silky-glossy, blackish-brown body. The large frons is finely punctate, with a finely raised longitudinal line in the middle at the suture. The pronotum is only slightly transverse, weakly projecting anteriorly, slightly wider laterally towards the rear, very weakly curved before the posterior angles. The elytra are irregularly punctate in the striae, with the intervals unpunctate and with setae beside the lateral margins.
