= Neoserica piceorufa =

Scientific classification
- Kingdom: Animalia
- Phylum: Arthropoda
- Class: Insecta
- Order: Coleoptera
- Suborder: Polyphaga
- Infraorder: Scarabaeiformia
- Family: Scarabaeidae
- Genus: Neoserica
- Species: N. piceorufa

Binomial name
- Neoserica piceorufa (Fairmaire, 1888)

Synonyms
- Serica piceorufa Fairmaire, 1888; Autoserica piceorufa

Species of beetle

Neoserica piceorufa is a species of beetle of the family Scarabaeidae. It is found in China (Beijing).

== Description ==
Adults reach a length of about 10 mm. They are ovate, very convex and entirely blackish-red, opaque beneath, velvety and very subtly iridescent. The pronotum is subtly and loosely punctate, and the elytra are ovate and quite subtly striate, with the striae subtly punctate. The intervals are barely convex and loosely punctate, somewhat denser at the striae.
