= Neoserica diversipennis =

Scientific classification
- Kingdom: Animalia
- Phylum: Arthropoda
- Clade: Pancrustacea
- Class: Insecta
- Order: Coleoptera
- Suborder: Polyphaga
- Infraorder: Scarabaeiformia
- Family: Scarabaeidae
- Genus: Neoserica
- Species: N. diversipennis

Binomial name
- Neoserica diversipennis Moser, 1915

Species of beetle

Neoserica diversipennis is a species of beetle of the family Scarabaeidae. It is found in Malaysia (Malacca).

== Description ==
Adults reach a length of about 8 mm. The head is sparsely setate and the antennae are brown. The elytra have distinct longitudinal grooves with irregular rows of punctures, making the sparsely punctate intervals appear as faint ribs.
