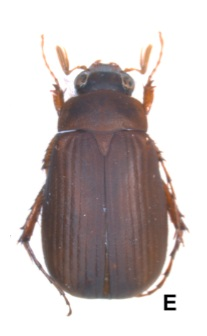

Scientific classification
- Kingdom: Animalia
- Phylum: Arthropoda
- Class: Insecta
- Order: Coleoptera
- Suborder: Polyphaga
- Infraorder: Scarabaeiformia
- Family: Scarabaeidae
- Genus: Neoserica
- Species: N. mianningana

Binomial name
- Neoserica mianningana Ahrens, 2023

= Neoserica mianningana =

Species of beetle

Neoserica mianningana is a species of beetle of the family Scarabaeidae. It is found in the China (Sichuan).

== Description ==
Adults reach a length of about 8.8–9.1 mm. Their body is oblong and reddish brown, with the ventral surface and antenna yellow, and the dorsal surface dull and almost glabrous.

== Etymology ==
The species is named for its occurrence close to the city of Mianning, China.
