= Neoserica sinuaticollis =

Scientific classification
- Kingdom: Animalia
- Phylum: Arthropoda
- Clade: Pancrustacea
- Class: Insecta
- Order: Coleoptera
- Suborder: Polyphaga
- Infraorder: Scarabaeiformia
- Family: Scarabaeidae
- Genus: Neoserica
- Species: N. sinuaticollis

Binomial name
- Neoserica sinuaticollis (Moser, 1917)

Synonyms
- Autoserica sinuaticollis Moser, 1917

Species of beetle

Neoserica sinuaticollis is a species of beetle of the family Scarabaeidae. It is found in Togo.

== Description ==
Adults reach a length of about 8–9.5 mm. They are reddish-brown and dull. The frons is dark, dull, and finely punctured and the antennae are yellowish-brown. The pronotum is finely punctured, with the punctures along the lateral margins with tiny setae, and with a few larger setae along the anterior margin. The elytra have rows of punctures, with the intervals quite widely punctured, and the punctures covered with tiny setae. The alternating intervals show scattered, somewhat more distinct setae.
