= Neoserica enganoana =

Scientific classification
- Kingdom: Animalia
- Phylum: Arthropoda
- Class: Insecta
- Order: Coleoptera
- Suborder: Polyphaga
- Infraorder: Scarabaeiformia
- Family: Scarabaeidae
- Genus: Neoserica
- Species: N. enganoana

Binomial name
- Neoserica enganoana Brenske, 1899

Species of beetle

Neoserica enganoana is a species of beetle of the family Scarabaeidae. It is found in Indonesia (Sumatra).

== Description ==
Adults reach a length of about 5–7 mm. They are dull, without an opalescent sheen, the clypeus, underside and legs are brownish-red. The pronotum is slightly rounded laterally with weakly rounded hind angles, the anterior margin is projecting in the middle, the surface is finely punctate, and the marginal setae are very weak. The scutellum is small. The elytra are densely punctate in the striae, the intervals form narrow, smoothly raised ridges that stand out weakly beneath the tomentum. The punctures contain minute hairs and scattered, very short setae. The pygidium is pointed.
