= Neoserica kamerunensis =

Scientific classification
- Kingdom: Animalia
- Phylum: Arthropoda
- Clade: Pancrustacea
- Class: Insecta
- Order: Coleoptera
- Suborder: Polyphaga
- Infraorder: Scarabaeiformia
- Family: Scarabaeidae
- Genus: Neoserica
- Species: N. kamerunensis

Binomial name
- Neoserica kamerunensis (Frey, 1976)

Synonyms
- Autoserica kamerunensis Frey, 1976

Species of beetle

Neoserica kamerunensis is a species of beetle of the family Scarabaeidae. It is found in Cameroon.

== Description ==
Adults reach a length of about 8–9 mm. The upper and lower surfaces are reddish-brown to dark reddish-brown, with the legs moderately glossy, while the pronotum, elytra and pygidium are dull. On the elytra and vertex are a few very scattered, fine, erect, pale setae and there are minute setae in the punctures of the pronotum and elytra.
