= Neoserica gallana =

Scientific classification
- Kingdom: Animalia
- Phylum: Arthropoda
- Class: Insecta
- Order: Coleoptera
- Suborder: Polyphaga
- Infraorder: Scarabaeiformia
- Family: Scarabaeidae
- Genus: Neoserica
- Species: N. gallana

Binomial name
- Neoserica gallana (Brenske, 1895)

Synonyms
- Serica gallana Brenske, 1895; Lepiserica gallana; Autoserica gallana

Species of beetle

Neoserica gallana is a species of beetle of the family Scarabaeidae. It is found in Ethiopia.

== Description ==
Adults reach a length of about 8.5–9 mm. They are dull yellowish-brown below and dark reddish-brown above, with white scale-like hairs and a spotted elytra. The frons is widely punctate and covered with greyish hairs. The pronotum is short, the anterior margin not projecting in the middle, weakly rounded at the edge, the posterior corners sharply and finely punctate, thinly covered with short scale-like hairs, only a median stripe remaining completely free. The pointed triangular scutellum is densely covered with white scales. The elytra are irregularly punctate, the intervals weakly raised, alternately smooth and punctate on the raised ribs, the smooth areas darker. All punctations have short white hairs and there are somewhat stronger hairs on the ribs.
