= Neoserica vulpina =

Scientific classification
- Kingdom: Animalia
- Phylum: Arthropoda
- Clade: Pancrustacea
- Class: Insecta
- Order: Coleoptera
- Suborder: Polyphaga
- Infraorder: Scarabaeiformia
- Family: Scarabaeidae
- Genus: Neoserica
- Species: N. vulpina

Binomial name
- Neoserica vulpina Moser, 1908

Species of beetle

Neoserica vulpina is a species of beetle of the family Scarabaeidae. It is found in Vietnam.

== Description ==
Adults reach a length of about 9.8 mm. They have a reddish brown, oval body. They are mostly dull with dense light hairs, interspersed with dense, long, strong, dark hairs. The underside is densely haired.
