= Neoserica boeri =

Scientific classification
- Kingdom: Animalia
- Phylum: Arthropoda
- Clade: Pancrustacea
- Class: Insecta
- Order: Coleoptera
- Suborder: Polyphaga
- Infraorder: Scarabaeiformia
- Family: Scarabaeidae
- Genus: Neoserica
- Species: N. boeri

Binomial name
- Neoserica boeri (Moser, 1916)

Synonyms
- Autoserica boeri Moser, 1916

Species of beetle

Neoserica boeri is a species of beetle of the family Scarabaeidae. It is found in Tanzania.

== Description ==
Adults reach a length of about 10 mm. They are brown, with a silky sheen. The frons is densely punctate. The pronotum is fairly densely punctate, the punctures with minute setae. The lateral margins are setate. The elytra have rows of punctures, which are very irregularly spaced on the weakly convex, more or less darkened intervals. The punctures have very small setae, although some of them are more distinct.
