= Neoserica nigrofusca =

Scientific classification
- Kingdom: Animalia
- Phylum: Arthropoda
- Clade: Pancrustacea
- Class: Insecta
- Order: Coleoptera
- Suborder: Polyphaga
- Infraorder: Scarabaeiformia
- Family: Scarabaeidae
- Genus: Neoserica
- Species: N. nigrofusca

Binomial name
- Neoserica nigrofusca Moser, 1915

Species of beetle

Neoserica nigrofusca is a species of beetle of the family Scarabaeidae. It is found in Indonesia (Sumatra).

== Description ==
Adults reach a length of about 10 mm. The upper surface is blackish-brown and densely tomentose, while the underside is lighter brown. The frons is widely punctate, with scattered setae beside the eyes. The antennae are yellowish-brown. The pronotum is moderately densely punctate, the punctures with minute setae. The lateral margins are slightly curved and setate. The elytra have punctate stripes, and the shallowly convex intervals are widely punctate. The punctures have minute setae, and the center of the intervals shows a narrow unpunctate longitudinal stripe.
