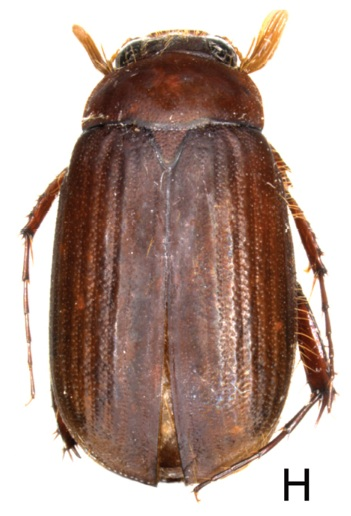

Scientific classification
- Kingdom: Animalia
- Phylum: Arthropoda
- Clade: Pancrustacea
- Class: Insecta
- Order: Coleoptera
- Suborder: Polyphaga
- Infraorder: Scarabaeiformia
- Family: Scarabaeidae
- Genus: Neoserica
- Species: N. igori

Binomial name
- Neoserica igori Ahrens, Fabrizi & Liu, 2014

= Neoserica igori =

Species of beetle

Neoserica igori is a species of beetle of the family Scarabaeidae. It is found in China (Yunnan).

== Description ==
Adults reach a length of about 8.6–9.5 mm. They have a dark reddish brown, oblong body. The antennal club is yellowish brown. The dorsal surface is dull and nearly glabrous, except for a few long setae on the head.

== Etymology ==
The species is named after one of its collectors, Igor Shokhin.
