= Neoserica crenatolineata =

Scientific classification
- Kingdom: Animalia
- Phylum: Arthropoda
- Class: Insecta
- Order: Coleoptera
- Suborder: Polyphaga
- Infraorder: Scarabaeiformia
- Family: Scarabaeidae
- Genus: Neoserica
- Species: N. crenatolineata

Binomial name
- Neoserica crenatolineata Ahrens & Fabrizi, 2009

Species of beetle

Neoserica crenatolineata is a species of beetle of the family Scarabaeidae. It is found in north-eastern India (western Arunachal Pradesh).

== Description ==
Adults reach a length of about 8.8 mm. They have a reddish brown, oblong body. The dorsal surface is mostly dull, the head covered with long erect setae, but otherwise nearly glabrous.

== Etymology ==
The species name is derived from Latin crenatus and lineatus and refers to the crenulated longitudinal ridge along the dorsal margin of the metatibia.
