= Neoserica kalaarensis =

Scientific classification
- Kingdom: Animalia
- Phylum: Arthropoda
- Class: Insecta
- Order: Coleoptera
- Suborder: Polyphaga
- Infraorder: Scarabaeiformia
- Family: Scarabaeidae
- Genus: Neoserica
- Species: N. kalaarensis

Binomial name
- Neoserica kalaarensis Fabrizi & Ahrens, 2014

Species of beetle

Neoserica kalaarensis is a species of beetle of the family Scarabaeidae. It is found in Sri Lanka.

== Description ==
Adults reach a length of about 5.1–5.9 mm. They have a light reddish brown, oval body, with yellowish brown antennae. The dorsal surface is completely shiny, except for some setae on the head.

== Etymology ==
The species is named after its type locality, Kal Aar.
