= Neoserica sterilis =

Scientific classification
- Kingdom: Animalia
- Phylum: Arthropoda
- Class: Insecta
- Order: Coleoptera
- Suborder: Polyphaga
- Infraorder: Scarabaeiformia
- Family: Scarabaeidae
- Genus: Neoserica
- Species: N. sterilis

Binomial name
- Neoserica sterilis Brenske, 1899

Species of beetle

Neoserica sterilis is a species of beetle of the family Scarabaeidae. It is found on Borneo.

== Description ==
Adults reach a length of about 9–10 mm. They are dark brown, very dull and without an opalescent sheen. The pronotum is slightly rounded at the sides, the posterior angles are broadly rounded and the anterior margin is projected forward in the middle. The surface is densely, somewhat unevenly, punctate, with minutely fine pubescence. The scutellum is long. The elytra are densely, coarsely, irregularly punctate in the striae with minute but distinct hairs in the punctures. The intervals are slightly raised, narrow and unpunctate.
