= Neoserica setipennis =

Scientific classification
- Kingdom: Animalia
- Phylum: Arthropoda
- Clade: Pancrustacea
- Class: Insecta
- Order: Coleoptera
- Suborder: Polyphaga
- Infraorder: Scarabaeiformia
- Family: Scarabaeidae
- Genus: Neoserica
- Species: N. setipennis

Binomial name
- Neoserica setipennis Moser, 1924

Species of beetle

Neoserica setipennis is a species of beetle of the family Scarabaeidae. It is found in Kenya.

== Description ==
Adults reach a length of about 8 mm. They are reddish-brown and opaque. The antennae are reddish-yellow. The pronotum has cilia along the sides and is subtly punctate and dotted with minute setae. The elytra are slightly sulcate, moderately densely punctate, and with the alternate interstices pale.
