= Neoserica fragilis =

Scientific classification
- Kingdom: Animalia
- Phylum: Arthropoda
- Class: Insecta
- Order: Coleoptera
- Suborder: Polyphaga
- Infraorder: Scarabaeiformia
- Family: Scarabaeidae
- Genus: Neoserica
- Species: N. fragilis

Binomial name
- Neoserica fragilis Ahrens & Pham, 2021

Species of beetle

Neoserica fragilis is a species of beetle of the family Scarabaeidae. It is found in Laos.

== Description ==
Adults reach a length of about 4.2–5.6 mm. They have a dark reddish brown, oval body. The elytra and pronotal margins are reddish brown and the antennal club and ventral surface are yellowish brown. The dorsal surface is mostly dull and nearly glabrous.

== Etymology ==
The species name is derived from Latin fragilis (meaning breakable).
