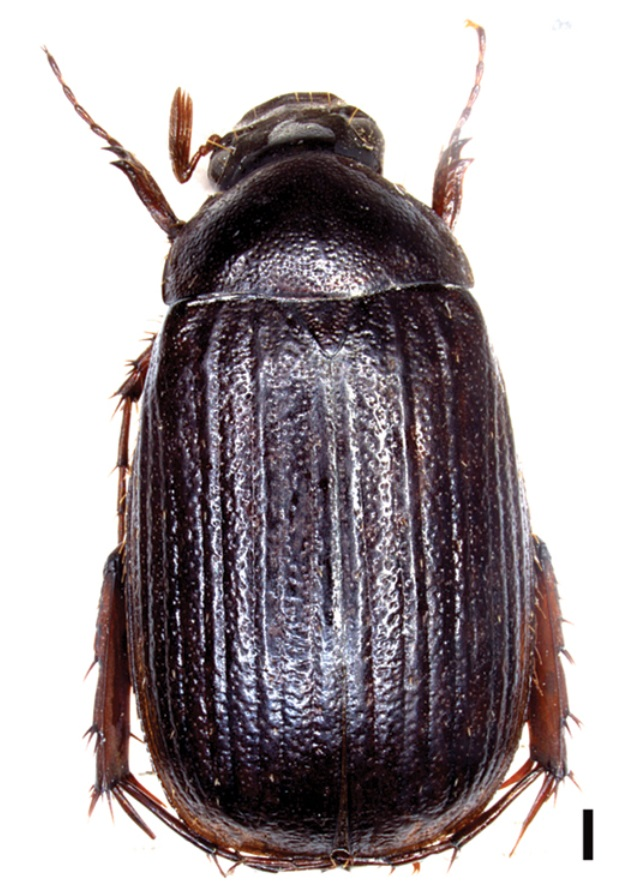

Scientific classification
- Kingdom: Animalia
- Phylum: Arthropoda
- Class: Insecta
- Order: Coleoptera
- Suborder: Polyphaga
- Infraorder: Scarabaeiformia
- Family: Scarabaeidae
- Genus: Neoserica
- Species: N. taunggyiana

Binomial name
- Neoserica taunggyiana Ahrens, Liu, Fabrizi, Bai & Yang, 2014

= Neoserica taunggyiana =

Species of beetle

Neoserica taunggyiana is a species of beetle of the family Scarabaeidae. It is found in Myanmar.

== Description ==
Adults reach a length of about 12 mm. They have a dark brown, oblong body. The antennal club is yellowish brown and the anterior labroclypeus is shiny. The dorsal surface is dull, and the opaque toment on the elytra and pronotum is less thick, with a light trace of shine, sparsely setose.

== Etymology ==
The species is named according to the type locality, Taunggyi.
