= Neoserica finitima =

Scientific classification
- Kingdom: Animalia
- Phylum: Arthropoda
- Class: Insecta
- Order: Coleoptera
- Suborder: Polyphaga
- Infraorder: Scarabaeiformia
- Family: Scarabaeidae
- Genus: Neoserica
- Species: N. finitima

Binomial name
- Neoserica finitima Brenske, 1902

Species of beetle

Neoserica finitima is a species of beetle of the family Scarabaeidae. It is found in Tanzania.

== Description ==
Adults reach a length of about 7 mm. They are dull and brown with a slightly greenish sheen and the elytra with faint setae. The convex pronotum has almost parallel sides, scarcely projecting anteriorly, the hind angles are very finely rounded. The elytra have distinct, fine rows of punctures, and the scarcely convex intervals are widely punctured. The hairs are barely discernible.
