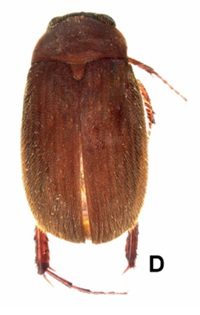

Scientific classification
- Kingdom: Animalia
- Phylum: Arthropoda
- Clade: Pancrustacea
- Class: Insecta
- Order: Coleoptera
- Suborder: Polyphaga
- Infraorder: Scarabaeiformia
- Family: Scarabaeidae
- Genus: Neoserica
- Species: N. gracilisetosa

Binomial name
- Neoserica gracilisetosa Ahrens, Fabrizi & Liu, 2019

= Neoserica gracilisetosa =

Species of beetle

Neoserica gracilisetosa is a species of beetle of the family Scarabaeidae. It is found in China (Henan, Qinghai, Shaanxi).

== Description ==
Adults reach a length of about 7.4–8.5 millimetres (0.29–0.33 in). They have a dark reddish brown, oblong body. The antennal club is yellowish brown and the dorsal surface is dull. Both the dorsal and ventral surface are densely setose and the labroclypeus is moderately shiny.

== Etymology ==
The name of the species is composed of the combined Latin words gracilis (meaning fine) and setosa (meaning hairy or setose), with reference to the fine, simple pilosity of the dorsal surface.
