= Neoserica freudei =

Scientific classification
- Kingdom: Animalia
- Phylum: Arthropoda
- Class: Insecta
- Order: Coleoptera
- Suborder: Polyphaga
- Infraorder: Scarabaeiformia
- Family: Scarabaeidae
- Genus: Neoserica
- Species: N. freudei

Binomial name
- Neoserica freudei (Frey, 1972)

Synonyms
- Autoserica freudei Frey, 1972

Species of beetle

Neoserica freudei is a species of beetle of the family Scarabaeidae. It is found in the Democratic Republic of the Congo.

== Description ==
Adults reach a length of about 7-7.5 mm. The upper and lower surfaces are reddish-brown. The upper surface is tomentose, while the head and pronotum are glabrous. The elytral punctures have minute hairs, and the elytra are otherwise extremely sparsely marked with a few protruding pale setae. The pronotum and elytral margins are ciliate.
