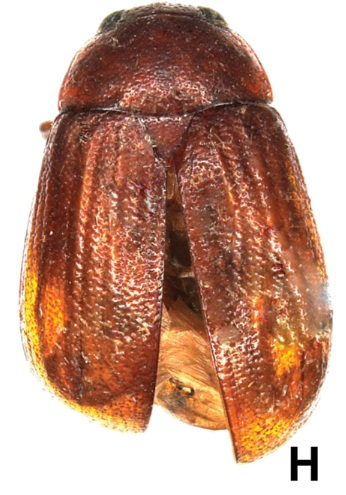

Scientific classification
- Kingdom: Animalia
- Phylum: Arthropoda
- Class: Insecta
- Order: Coleoptera
- Suborder: Polyphaga
- Infraorder: Scarabaeiformia
- Family: Scarabaeidae
- Genus: Neoserica
- Species: N. emeishanensis

Binomial name
- Neoserica emeishanensis Liu, Fabrizi, Bai, Yang & Ahrens, 2014

= Neoserica emeishanensis =

Species of beetle

Neoserica emeishanensis is a species of beetle of the family Scarabaeidae. It is found in China (Sichuan).

== Description ==
Adults reach a length of about 6.6–7 mm. They have a dark reddish brown, oblong body. The antennal club is yellowish brown. The dorsal surface is shiny and densely covered with fine, semi-erect setae.

== Etymology ==
The species is named after its type locality, Emeishan mountain.
