= Neoserica grossepunctata =

Scientific classification
- Kingdom: Animalia
- Phylum: Arthropoda
- Class: Insecta
- Order: Coleoptera
- Suborder: Polyphaga
- Infraorder: Scarabaeiformia
- Family: Scarabaeidae
- Genus: Neoserica
- Species: N. grossepunctata

Binomial name
- Neoserica grossepunctata Ahrens, 2003

Species of beetle

Neoserica grossepunctata is a species of beetle of the family Scarabaeidae. It is found in Laos.

== Description ==
Adults reach a length of about 6.7–7.6 mm. They have a brown, oval body. Part of the upper surface has a greenish shimmer. They are mostly dull with dense light hairs, interspersed with dense, long, strong, dark hairs. The underside is densely haired.

== Etymology ==
The species name is derived from Latin grossus (meaning large) and punctatus (meaning dotted).
