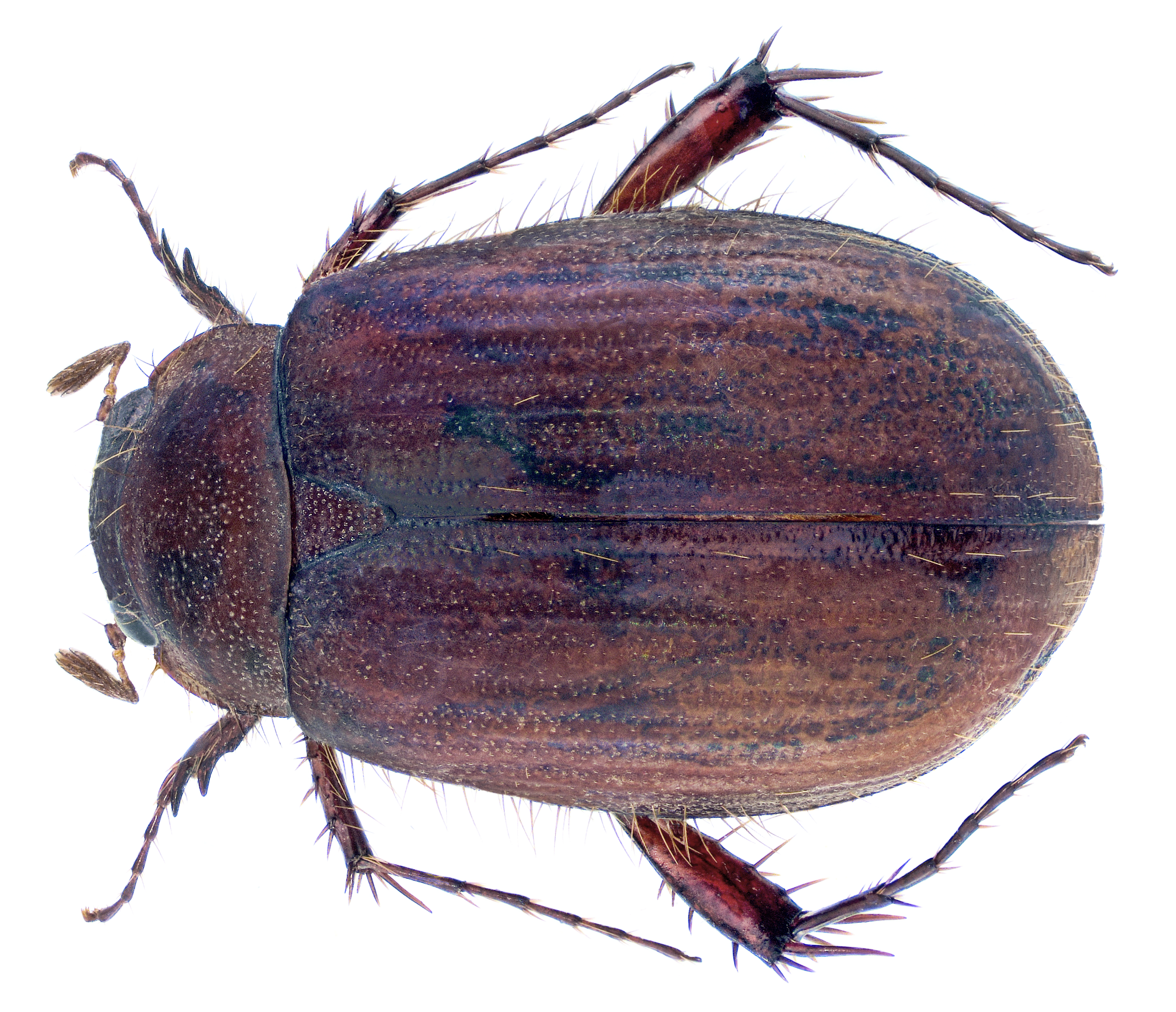
- Neoserica sapaensis

Scientific classification
- Kingdom: Animalia
- Phylum: Arthropoda
- Clade: Pancrustacea
- Class: Insecta
- Order: Coleoptera
- Suborder: Polyphaga
- Infraorder: Scarabaeiformia
- Family: Scarabaeidae
- Tribe: Sericini
- Genus: Neoserica; Brenske, 1894

Synonyms
- Autoserica Brenske, 1898; Lepiserica Brenske, 1900

= Neoserica =

Genus of scarab beetles

Neuroserica is a genus of scarab beetles that belongs to the tribe Sericini.

== Taxonomy ==
=== Species ===
- Subgenus Autoserica Brenske, 1898
  - Neoserica adumana Brenske, 1902
  - Neoserica angolana Moser, 1920
  - Neoserica annectens Péringuey, 1904
  - Neoserica antennalis (Blanchard, 1850)
  - Neoserica atrata (Reiche, 1850)
  - Neoserica australis Péringuey, 1904
  - Neoserica badia Brenske, 1902
  - Neoserica barbata Brenske, 1901
  - Neoserica benguellana Moser, 1918
  - Neoserica benigna (Brenske, 1901)
  - Neoserica benuensis Brenske, 1902
  - Neoserica bicolor Burgeon, 1942
  - Neoserica bicolor Frey, 1960
  - Neoserica boeri Moser, 1916
  - Neoserica bomuana Brenske, 1899
  - Neoserica bourgeoni Moser, 1916
  - Neoserica bredoi Burgeon, 1942
  - Neoserica brenskei Frey, 1968
  - Neoserica budjunguana (Brenske, 1901)
  - Neoserica buruana Moser, 1916
  - Neoserica callosiventris Moser, 1916
  - Neoserica capeneri Frey, 1964
  - Neoserica ciliaticollis Moser, 1917
  - Neoserica cinchonae Burgeon, 1946
  - Neoserica clypealis Burgeon, 1942
  - Neoserica collarti Burgeon, 1942
  - Neoserica comata Burgeon, 1942
  - Neoserica concordans Péringuey, 1904
  - Neoserica confinis (Burmeister, 1855)
  - Neoserica congoensis Moser, 1916
  - Neoserica consimilis (Linell, 1896)
  - Neoserica dahomeyensis Moser, 1916
  - Neoserica davaoensis Moser, 1917
  - Neoserica delagoana (Brenske, 1901)
  - Neoserica denticrus Burgeon, 1942
  - Neoserica desaegeri Burgeon, 1942
  - Neoserica desquamata (Brenske, 1901)
  - Neoserica desquamifera (Brenske, 1901)
  - Neoserica dilatatipes Moser, 1916
  - Neoserica distinguenda Péringuey, 1904
  - Neoserica ealana Moser, 1916
  - Neoserica elisabethana Burgeon, 1942
  - Neoserica epipleuralis Burgeon, 1942
  - Neoserica farsilis (Brenske, 1901)
  - Neoserica fartula (Péringuey, 1904)
  - Neoserica fasciata Moser, 1911
  - Neoserica fasta (Brenske, 1901)
  - Neoserica flabellata Burgeon, 1942
  - Neoserica flavescens Moser, 1915
  - Neoserica flaviventris Moser, 1916
  - Neoserica flavopicta Frey, 1972
  - Neoserica fluviatica Brenske, 1902
  - Neoserica freudei Frey, 1972
  - Neoserica freynei Burgeon, 1942
  - Neoserica fucata (Brenske, 1901)
  - Neoserica fucatella (Brenske, 1901)
  - Neoserica fullonica (Brenske, 1901)
  - Neoserica fulvicolor (Quedenfeldt, 1884)
  - Neoserica gabonica Brenske, 1902
  - Neoserica gallana (Brenske, 1895)
  - Neoserica guinesis (Brenske, 1901)
  - Neoserica haafi (Frey, 1960)
  - Neoserica ibemboana (Brenske, 1902)
  - Neoserica insulicola Moser, 1916
  - Neoserica iridipes Moser, 1916
  - Neoserica iringana Moser, 1916
  - Neoserica iringensis Moser, 1916
  - Neoserica jokona Moser, 1916
  - Neoserica kamerunensis Frey, 1976
  - Neoserica kamerunica Moser, 1916
  - Neoserica kanseniae Burgeon, 1942
  - Neoserica kigonserana Moser, 1920
  - Neoserica konduensis Moser, 1916
  - Neoserica kundelungu Burgeon, 1942
  - Neoserica latipes (Kolbe, 1883)
  - Neoserica leopoldi Burgeon, 1942
  - Neoserica leplaei Burgeon, 1942
  - Neoserica loangoana Brenske, 1902
  - Neoserica lombokensis Moser, 1916
  - Neoserica longicornis Moser, 1917
  - Neoserica lubutensis Burgeon, 1942
  - Neoserica lucidula (Péringuey, 1892)
  - Neoserica lydenburgiana (Brenske, 1902)
  - Neoserica madibirana Moser, 1920
  - Neoserica maritima Moser, 1916
  - Neoserica methneri Moser, 1924
  - Neoserica microchaeta Moser, 1924
  - Neoserica mombassana Brenske, 1902
  - Neoserica monticola Moser, 1915
  - Neoserica moseri Frey, 1966
  - Neoserica multimaculata (Brenske, 1899)
  - Neoserica nasuta Frey, 1968
  - Neoserica neavei Burgeon, 1942
  - Neoserica nitidior Frey, 1972
  - Neoserica obscurifrons Moser, 1916
  - Neoserica opacula Moser, 1924
  - Neoserica overlaeti Burgeon, 1942
  - Neoserica permagna Moser, 1915
  - Neoserica piceorufa (Fairmaire, 1888)
  - Neoserica plebeja Moser, 1916
  - Neoserica politzari Frey, 1974
  - Neoserica proteana Péringuey, 1904
  - Neoserica pusilla Moser, 1918
  - Neoserica rhodesiana Péringuey, 1904
  - Neoserica richardi Burgeon, 1942
  - Neoserica ruandensis Burgeon, 1942
  - Neoserica ruficeps Moser, 1916
  - Neoserica rufiventris Moser, 1924
  - Neoserica rungweensis Frey, 1974
  - Neoserica runsorica (Kolbe, 1914)
  - Neoserica sagulata (Quedenfeldt, 1884)
  - Neoserica sarawakensis Moser, 1915
  - Neoserica schwetzi Burgeon, 1942
  - Neoserica scutata Moser, 1916
  - Neoserica sedonensis Frey, 1972
  - Neoserica seminitens (Frey, 1966)
  - Neoserica senegalensis Frey, 1968
  - Neoserica seriata Moser, 1917
  - Neoserica sericina Moser, 1916
  - Neoserica servilis (Brenske, 1899)
  - Neoserica setipes Moser, 1918
  - Neoserica sexflabellata Frey, 1960
  - Neoserica seydeli Moser, 1924
  - Neoserica similis Frey, 1966
  - Neoserica sinuaticollis Moser, 1917
  - Neoserica somalicola Frey, 1976
  - Neoserica subcostata Moser, 1918
  - Neoserica sudanensis Frey, 1970
  - Neoserica sulcigera Moser, 1917
  - Neoserica suturalis Burgeon, 1942
  - Neoserica symmetrica Frey, 1976
  - Neoserica tessellata Péringuey, 1904
  - Neoserica tinanti Burgeon, 1942
  - Neoserica togoensis Moser, 1916
  - Neoserica tristis Frey, 1970
  - Neoserica ukamina (Brenske, 1901)
  - Neoserica umbugwensis Moser, 1917
  - Neoserica usambarana Moser, 1916
  - Neoserica vanderijsti Burgeon, 1942
  - Neoserica verhulsti Burgeon, 1942
  - Neoserica verticalis (Lansberge, 1886)
  - Neoserica vietnamensis Frey, 1972
  - Neoserica vrydaghi Burgeon, 1942
  - Neoserica wavuana (Kolbe, 1914)
  - Neoserica zenkeri (Brenske, 1902)
  - Neoserica zoutpaniana (Brenske, 1901)
- Subgenus Neoserica
  - Neoserica abnormis Moser, 1908
  - Neoserica abnormoides Ahrens, Liu, Fabrizi, Bai & Yang, 2014
  - Neoserica absoluta (Brenske, 1899)
  - Neoserica acceptabilis Brenske, 1899
  - Neoserica aequalis (Frey, 1970)
  - Neoserica agumbeensis Ahrens & Fabrizi, 2016
  - Neoserica ailaoshanica Liu, Fabrizi, Bai, Yang & Ahrens, 2014
  - Neoserica akurdi Kalawate, 2025
  - Neoserica allobscura Ahrens, Fabrizi & Liu, 2016
  - Neoserica allolaotica Ahrens, Liu, Fabrizi, Bai & Yang, 2014
  - Neoserica alloputaoana Ahrens, Liu, Fabrizi, Bai & Yang, 2014
  - Neoserica allorubiginea Ahrens, Fabrizi & Liu, 2019
  - Neoserica allosigillata Ahrens & Pham, 2021
  - Neoserica ammattiensis Ahrens & Fabrizi, 2016
  - Neoserica anmaxinzhaiensis Ahrens, Fabrizi & Liu, 2019
  - Neoserica anonyma Liu, Fabrizi, Bai, Yang & Ahrens, 2014
  - Neoserica antennalis Frey, 1960
  - Neoserica armata Moser, 1922
  - Neoserica arunachalana Ahrens & Fabrizi, 2009
  - Neoserica ascripticia Brenske, 1899
  - Neoserica assamensis (Frey, 1962)
  - Neoserica astuta Ahrens & Fabrizi, 2016
  - Neoserica aulica Ahrens & Fabrizi, 2016
  - Neoserica austera Moser, 1917
  - Neoserica axelkalliesi Ahrens & Pham, 2021
  - Neoserica bailongshanica Ahrens, Fabrizi & Liu, 2019
  - Neoserica bairailingshanica Ahrens, Liu, Fabrizi, Bai & Yang, 2014
  - Neoserica baishuiensis Ahrens, Fabrizi & Liu, 2014
  - Neoserica balabaca Brenske, 1899
  - Neoserica bannapensis Ahrens, 2003
  - Neoserica bansongchana Ahrens, Fabrizi & Liu, 2014
  - Neoserica baoshana Ahrens, Fabrizi & Liu, 2014
  - Neoserica barberi (Sharp, 1903)
  - Neoserica baryca Brenske, 1902
  - Neoserica basilica Brenske, 1902
  - Neoserica bataviana Moser, 1920
  - Neoserica batoeana Moser, 1916
  - Neoserica bedieri Moser, 1915
  - Neoserica berlineri Sreedevi & Ahrens, 2025
  - Neoserica bhalukpongensis Ahrens & Fabrizi, 2016
  - Neoserica bibosa Brenske, 1902
  - Neoserica bicolorea Ahrens & Fabrizi, 2016
  - Neoserica biuncinata Ahrens, Fabrizi & Liu, 2014
  - Neoserica borneensis Brenske, 1899
  - Neoserica brastagiensis Moser, 1922
  - Neoserica brevicollis Moser, 1922
  - Neoserica brevicrus Moser, 1915
  - Neoserica bruneica Brenske, 1899
  - Neoserica butuana Moser, 1922
  - Neoserica caiyangheensis Ahrens, Fabrizi & Liu, 2019
  - Neoserica calva (Frey, 1972)
  - Neoserica calvoides Liu, Fabrizi, Bai, Yang & Ahrens, 2014
  - Neoserica cardamomensis Ahrens, Liu, Fabrizi, Bai & Yang, 2014
  - Neoserica carneola (Péringuey, 1892)
  - Neoserica castanescens Moser, 1915
  - Neoserica champassakensis Ahrens, 2022
  - Neoserica changrae Ahrens, 2004
  - Neoserica chayuensis Liu & Ahrens, 2014
  - Neoserica chetaoensis Ahrens & Pham, 2021
  - Neoserica christophi Bohacz & Ahrens, 2020
  - Neoserica churachandpurensis Gupta, Bhunia, Ahrens & Chandra, 2025
  - Neoserica ciliata Moser, 1920
  - Neoserica ciliatipennis Moser, 1924
  - Neoserica clypeata (Fairmaire, 1893)
  - Neoserica crenatolineata Ahrens & Fabrizi, 2009
  - Neoserica curticrus Moser, 1915
  - Neoserica curvipenis Liu, Fabrizi, Bai, Yang & Ahrens, 2014
  - Neoserica danganensis Zhao, Huang, Huang & Ahrens, 2025
  - Neoserica dashanensis Ahrens, Fabrizi & Liu, 2019
  - Neoserica daweishanica Ahrens, Fabrizi & Liu, 2014
  - Neoserica daxue Ahrens, 2023
  - Neoserica debasriae Bhunia, Gupta, Chandra & Ahrens, 2022
  - Neoserica defuensis Ahrens, Fabrizi & Liu, 2019
  - Neoserica denticulata Moser, 1922
  - Neoserica dharmapriyai Ranasinghe, Eberle, Benjamin & Ahrens, 2020
  - Neoserica dianae Ahrens, Fabrizi & Liu, 2019
  - Neoserica dichroa Frey, 1973
  - Neoserica dilatipennis Ahrens, Fabrizi & Liu, 2019
  - Neoserica dilleri Frey, 1972
  - Neoserica diplospinosa Ahrens & Pham, 2021
  - Neoserica disciplineensis Ahrens & Fabrizi, 2016
  - Neoserica diversipennis Moser, 1915
  - Neoserica dongjiafenensis Ahrens, Fabrizi & Liu, 2016
  - Neoserica dundai Ahrens, Fabrizi & Liu, 2014
  - Neoserica elisabethae Burgeon, 1947
  - Neoserica emeishanensis Liu, Fabrizi, Bai, Yang & Ahrens, 2014
  - Neoserica endroedii (Frey, 1974)
  - Neoserica enganoana Brenske, 1899
  - Neoserica euyunnanica Ahrens, Liu, Fabrizi, Bai & Yang, 2014
  - Neoserica exoleta Ahrens & Fabrizi, 2009
  - Neoserica fairyqueen Ahrens, 2022
  - Neoserica fanjingshanica Ahrens, 2003
  - Neoserica fecunda Brenske, 1902
  - Neoserica felschei Brenske, 1899
  - Neoserica femoralis Moser, 1911
  - Neoserica finitima Brenske, 1902
  - Neoserica fischeri Moser, 1911
  - Neoserica flagrans Ahrens & Fabrizi, 2016
  - Neoserica flavorufa Moser, 1915
  - Neoserica flavoviridis (Brenske, 1896)
  - Neoserica flexiclava Ahrens, 2003
  - Neoserica fopingensis Ahrens, Fabrizi & Liu, 2019
  - Neoserica fragilis Ahrens & Pham, 2021
  - Neoserica fraterna Brenske, 1902
  - Neoserica fruhstorferi Brenske, 1899
  - Neoserica fugongensis Ahrens, Fabrizi & Liu, 2016
  - Neoserica fukiensis (Frey, 1972)
  - Neoserica funiushanensis Ahrens, Fabrizi & Liu, 2019
  - Neoserica fuscula Moser, 1921
  - Neoserica fusiforceps Ahrens & Fabrizi, 2016
  - Neoserica ganhaiziana Ahrens, Fabrizi & Liu, 2014
  - Neoserica gaoligongshanica Ahrens, Fabrizi & Liu, 2014
  - Neoserica garlangensis Ahrens, 2004
  - Neoserica gebieni Moser, 1918
  - Neoserica genieri Ahrens & Fabrizi, 2016
  - Neoserica gracilisetosa Ahrens, Fabrizi & Liu, 2019
  - Neoserica grandis (Brenske, 1894)
  - Neoserica gravida Ahrens & Fabrizi, 2016
  - Neoserica grossepunctata Ahrens, 2003
  - Neoserica guangpingensis Ahrens, Fabrizi & Liu, 2014
  - Neoserica gulinqingensis Liu, Fabrizi, Bai, Yang & Ahrens, 2014
  - Neoserica hainana (Brenske, 1899)
  - Neoserica harrarensis Moser, 1916
  - Neoserica heishuiana Ahrens, Fabrizi & Liu, 2014
  - Neoserica heringi Brenske, 1899
  - Neoserica heterophylla Moser, 1914
  - Neoserica hirokazui Ahrens, 2003
  - Neoserica hongheana Ahrens, 2021
  - Neoserica huangi Ahrens, Liu, Fabrizi, Bai & Yang, 2014
  - Neoserica huangjingensis Ahrens, Fabrizi & Liu, 2019
  - Neoserica igori Ahrens, Fabrizi & Liu, 2014
  - Neoserica ihlei Ahrens & Pham, 2021
  - Neoserica ikuthana Brenske, 1902
  - Neoserica incisa Ahrens & Fabrizi, 2016
  - Neoserica inclinata Brenske, 1899
  - Neoserica incompta Ahrens & Fabrizi, 2009
  - Neoserica indistincta Brenske, 1899
  - Neoserica infamiliaris Ahrens & Fabrizi, 2016
  - Neoserica inops Ahrens & Fabrizi, 2009
  - Neoserica inspergata Ahrens & Fabrizi, 2009
  - Neoserica insubida (Brenske, 1899)
  - Neoserica insulana Moser, 1915
  - Neoserica javana Moser, 1915
  - Neoserica jianfenglingica Ahrens, Fabrizi & Liu, 2019
  - Neoserica jiangxiensis Ahrens, Liu, Fabrizi, Bai & Yang, 2014
  - Neoserica jinggangshanica Ahrens, 2003
  - Neoserica jinpingica Ahrens, Fabrizi & Liu, 2019
  - Neoserica jiulongensis Ahrens, Fabrizi & Liu, 2014
  - Neoserica judsoni Ahrens & Pham, 2021
  - Neoserica kachinensis Ahrens & Fabrizi, 2011
  - Neoserica kalaarensis Fabrizi & Ahrens, 2014
  - Neoserica kalkadensis Ahrens & Fabrizi, 2016
  - Neoserica kalliesi Ahrens, 2003
  - Neoserica kannegieteri Moser, 1915
  - Neoserica kanphantensis Ahrens, Liu, Fabrizi, Bai & Yang, 2014
  - Neoserica kaskiensis Ahrens, 2004
  - Neoserica kejvali Ahrens & Fabrizi, 2016
  - Neoserica keralana Ahrens & Fabrizi, 2016
  - Neoserica kereni Ahrens, Fabrizi & Liu, 2014
  - Neoserica kilimandscharoana Brenske, 1902
  - Neoserica kochi (Frey, 1968)
  - Neoserica koelkebecki Liu, Fabrizi, Bai, Yang & Ahrens, 2014
  - Neoserica kuaichangensis Ahrens, 2003
  - Neoserica kunmingensis Ahrens, Fabrizi & Liu, 2014
  - Neoserica lamellosa Ahrens, Liu, Fabrizi, Bai & Yang, 2014
  - Neoserica lampei Moser, 1915
  - Neoserica lamuensis Brenske, 1902
  - Neoserica laocaiana Ahrens, Fabrizi & Liu, 2014
  - Neoserica lateriuncinata Ahrens, Fabrizi & Liu, 2014
  - Neoserica legitima Brenske, 1899
  - Neoserica leiboensis Ahrens, Fabrizi & Liu, 2014
  - Neoserica leigongshanica Ahrens, Fabrizi & Liu, 2019
  - Neoserica lenangensis Ahrens & Fabrizi, 2009
  - Neoserica liangi Liu, Fabrizi, Bai, Yang & Ahrens, 2014
  - Neoserica liangshandingensis Ahrens, Fabrizi & Liu, 2019
  - Neoserica limbangica Moser, 1915
  - Neoserica lincangensis Liu, Fabrizi, Bai, Yang & Ahrens, 2014
  - Neoserica litoralis Moser, 1916
  - Neoserica loeffleri Ahrens & Fabrizi, 2011
  - Neoserica lombokiana Brenske, 1899
  - Neoserica longiclava Moser, 1916
  - Neoserica longwangshanica Ahrens, Fabrizi & Liu, 2019
  - Neoserica lubrica Brenske, 1899
  - Neoserica lucidifrons Ahrens, 2003
  - Neoserica lucifuga Brenske, 1899
  - Neoserica ludingensis Liu, Fabrizi, Bai, Yang & Ahrens, 2014
  - Neoserica lushuiana Liu, Fabrizi, Bai, Yang & Ahrens, 2014
  - Neoserica lutea Brenske, 1899
  - Neoserica lutulosa Brenske, 1899
  - Neoserica luxiensis Liu, Fabrizi, Bai, Yang & Ahrens, 2014
  - Neoserica luzhouana Ahrens, Fabrizi & Liu, 2014
  - Neoserica luzonica Moser, 1915
  - Neoserica madurana Moser, 1915
  - Neoserica major (Arrow, 1946)
  - Neoserica makilingica Moser, 1915
  - Neoserica malaccana Moser, 1921
  - Neoserica mantillerii Ahrens, Fabrizi & Liu, 2016
  - Neoserica martinui Ahrens, Fabrizi & Liu, 2019
  - Neoserica matura Ahrens, 2004
  - Neoserica medana Moser, 1915
  - Neoserica menghaiensis Liu, Fabrizi, Bai, Yang & Ahrens, 2014
  - Neoserica mengi Liu, Fabrizi, Bai, Yang & Ahrens, 2014
  - Neoserica menglaensis Ahrens, Fabrizi & Liu, 2019
  - Neoserica menglunensis Ahrens, Fabrizi & Liu, 2016
  - Neoserica mengsongensis Liu & Ahrens, 2015
  - Neoserica mianningana Ahrens, 2023
  - Neoserica milani Ahrens, Fabrizi & Liu, 2019
  - Neoserica minor (Arrow, 1946)
  - Neoserica moffartsi Brenske, 1900
  - Neoserica montana Moser, 1915
  - Neoserica mucronota Moser, 1922
  - Neoserica mudigereensis Ahrens & Fabrizi, 2016
  - Neoserica mukdahan Miyake, Yamaguchi & Aoki, 2002
  - Neoserica multiflabellata Moser, 1916
  - Neoserica multifoliata Moser, 1920
  - Neoserica munnarensis Ahrens & Fabrizi, 2016
  - Neoserica myanmarensis Ahrens, 2023
  - Neoserica namthaensis Ahrens, Liu, Fabrizi, Bai & Yang, 2014
  - Neoserica nangana (Frey, 1968)
  - Neoserica nanhuaensis Ahrens, Fabrizi & Liu, 2019
  - Neoserica nannuoshanica Ahrens, Fabrizi & Liu, 2019
  - Neoserica napoensis Ahrens, Fabrizi & Liu, 2019
  - Neoserica natalensis Brenske, 1902
  - Neoserica nathani (Frey, 1972)
  - Neoserica natmatoungensis Ahrens, Liu, Fabrizi, Bai & Yang, 2014
  - Neoserica niasica Moser, 1915
  - Neoserica nigrescens Moser, 1915
  - Neoserica nigrofusca Moser, 1915
  - Neoserica nigrosetosa Moser, 1908
  - Neoserica nilgiriana Ahrens & Fabrizi, 2016
  - Neoserica ningyuanensis Ahrens, Fabrizi & Liu, 2014
  - Neoserica nitens Frey, 1960
  - Neoserica nitidirostris (Linell, 1896)
  - Neoserica nitidula Frey, 1972
  - Neoserica nyassica Brenske, 1902
  - Neoserica nykli Ahrens, Fabrizi & Liu, 2014
  - Neoserica obesa (Péringuey, 1892)
  - Neoserica obscura (Blanchard, 1850)
  - Neoserica opacula Moser, 1924
  - Neoserica ovata Moser, 1915
  - Neoserica pachecoae Ahrens, 2021
  - Neoserica padangensis Moser, 1916
  - Neoserica panchmariensis Bhunia, Gupta, Chandra & Ahrens, 2022
  - Neoserica panganiensis Brenske, 1902
  - Neoserica paradoxa Ahrens, 2021
  - Neoserica parajingangshanica Liu, Ahrens, Li & Yang, 2024
  - Neoserica paramajor Ahrens, Fabrizi & Liu, 2019
  - Neoserica pararubiginea Ahrens, Fabrizi & Liu, 2019
  - Neoserica parausta Ahrens, Fabrizi & Liu, 2014
  - Neoserica pariliforceps Ahrens, Fabrizi & Liu, 2019
  - Neoserica parilis Ahrens & Fabrizi, 2016
  - Neoserica parursina Ahrens, 2003
  - Neoserica pavicana Brenske, 1899
  - Neoserica penangica Brenske, 1899
  - Neoserica peninsularis Moser, 1915
  - Neoserica perakensis Moser, 1915
  - Neoserica peregovitsi Ahrens & Pham, 2021
  - Neoserica periyarensis Ahrens & Fabrizi, 2016
  - Neoserica phuphami Ahrens & Lukic, 2022
  - Neoserica phuphanensis Ahrens, 2003
  - Neoserica phuruaensis Ahrens, 2003
  - Neoserica picea (Nonfried, 1891)
  - Neoserica pilistriata Ahrens & Fabrizi, 2016
  - Neoserica pilosula Moser, 1915
  - Neoserica pingbianensis Ahrens, Fabrizi & Liu, 2019
  - Neoserica plagiata Ahrens & Fabrizi, 2016
  - Neoserica plasoni Brenske, 1899
  - Neoserica plateosa Ahrens & Fabrizi, 2016
  - Neoserica plebea Ahrens & Fabrizi, 2016
  - Neoserica plurilamellata Ahrens, Fabrizi & Liu, 2014
  - Neoserica ponderosa (Arrow, 1946)
  - Neoserica pophami Ranasinghe, Eberle, Athukorala, Benjamin & Ahrens, 2022
  - Neoserica preangerensis Moser, 1916
  - Neoserica principalis Balthasar, 1932
  - Neoserica probsti Ahrens, 2004
  - Neoserica propria Brenske, 1899
  - Neoserica pseudomajor Ahrens & Fabrizi, 2016
  - Neoserica pseudosangangana Liu & Ahrens, 2015
  - Neoserica pseudosilvestris Ahrens, Fabrizi & Liu, 2016
  - Neoserica pseudovulpes Ahrens, Fabrizi & Liu, 2014
  - Neoserica pseudovulpina Ahrens, 2003
  - Neoserica pubescens (Burmeister, 1855)
  - Neoserica pubiforceps Ahrens, 2004
  - Neoserica pui Ahrens, Fabrizi & Liu, 2019
  - Neoserica puncticeps Moser, 1913
  - Neoserica pushkarensis Ahrens & Fabrizi, 2016
  - Neoserica putaoana Ahrens, Liu, Fabrizi, Bai & Yang, 2014
  - Neoserica qingyinica Ahrens, Fabrizi & Liu, 2019
  - Neoserica quadrilamellata (Brenske, 1896)
  - Neoserica quinqueflabellata (Brenske, 1896)
  - Neoserica radhanagariensis Sreedevi, Speer, Fabrizi & Ahrens, 2018
  - Neoserica rajasthanica Ahrens & Fabrizi, 2016
  - Neoserica rangshuiensis Liu, Fabrizi, Bai, Yang & Ahrens, 2014
  - Neoserica reni Ahrens, Fabrizi & Liu, 2019
  - Neoserica reuteri Sreedevi, Ranasinghe, Fabrizi & Ahrens, 2019
  - Neoserica ritsemae Brenske, 1899
  - Neoserica rotundotibialis Ahrens & Fabrizi, 2016
  - Neoserica rubellula Ahrens, Fabrizi & Liu, 2014
  - Neoserica rubiginea Moser, 1916
  - Neoserica rubra Brenske, 1899
  - Neoserica rufobrunnea (Nonfried, 1894)
  - Neoserica rufofusca Moser, 1916
  - Neoserica rufoplagiatoides Ahrens & Pham, 2021
  - Neoserica rufula Moser, 1915
  - Neoserica rugiceps Moser, 1917
  - Neoserica rutilans Ahrens & Fabrizi, 2009
  - Neoserica ruzickai Ahrens, Fabrizi & Liu, 2014
  - Neoserica sakoliana Ahrens, Fabrizi & Liu, 2016
  - Neoserica samuelsoni Ahrens, 2022
  - Neoserica sandeana Brenske, 1902
  - Neoserica sangangana Ahrens, 2003
  - Neoserica sangangensis Ahrens, Fabrizi & Liu, 2019
  - Neoserica sapaensis Ahrens, Fabrizi & Liu, 2014
  - Neoserica saturella Brenske, 1898
  - Neoserica schoolmeestersi Ahrens, 2019
  - Neoserica semipubescens Ahrens, 2003
  - Neoserica senegalensis Brenske, 1902
  - Neoserica septemfoliata Moser, 1915
  - Neoserica septemlamellata Brenske, 1899
  - Neoserica setifrons Moser, 1916
  - Neoserica setigera (Brenske, 1894)
  - Neoserica setipennis Moser, 1924
  - Neoserica setiventris Moser, 1913
  - Neoserica sexfoliata Moser, 1915
  - Neoserica sforziae Ahrens & Fabrizi, 2016
  - Neoserica sharkeyi Ahrens & Pham, 2021
  - Neoserica sharpi Brenske, 1899
  - Neoserica shennongjiaensis Liu, Fabrizi, Bai, Yang & Ahrens, 2014
  - Neoserica shibingensis Ahrens, 2003
  - Neoserica shillongensis Ahrens & Fabrizi, 2016
  - Neoserica shinkaisiensis Ahrens, Fabrizi & Liu, 2014
  - Neoserica shuizhouensis Ahrens, Fabrizi & Liu, 2019
  - Neoserica shuyongi Ahrens, Fabrizi & Liu, 2016
  - Neoserica sichuanica Ahrens, Fabrizi & Liu, 2014
  - Neoserica sigillata (Brenske, 1898)
  - Neoserica signativentris Moser, 1921
  - Neoserica silvestris Brenske, 1902
  - Neoserica simplicissima Ahrens, Liu, Fabrizi, Bai & Yang, 2014
  - Neoserica sladeni Ahrens, 2004
  - Neoserica soekarandana Brenske, 1899
  - Neoserica sparsesquamata Ahrens & Fabrizi, 2016
  - Neoserica speciosa Brenske, 1899
  - Neoserica squalida Brenske, 1899
  - Neoserica squamifera Brenske, 1899
  - Neoserica squamuligera Moser, 1915
  - Neoserica sterilis Brenske, 1899
  - Neoserica strbai Ahrens, 2003
  - Neoserica strenua Ahrens, Fabrizi & Liu, 2019
  - Neoserica submaculosa Ahrens & Fabrizi, 2016
  - Neoserica surigaoana Moser, 1917
  - Neoserica suturata (Brenske, 1894)
  - Neoserica tahianensis Ahrens, Fabrizi & Liu, 2016
  - Neoserica taibaiensis Liu & Ahrens, 2015
  - Neoserica taipingensis Liu, Fabrizi, Bai, Yang & Ahrens, 2014
  - Neoserica takakuwai Ahrens, Fabrizi & Liu, 2014
  - Neoserica tamdaoensis Ahrens, 2003
  - Neoserica taunggyiana Ahrens, Liu, Fabrizi, Bai & Yang, 2014
  - Neoserica thailandensis Ahrens, Liu, Fabrizi, Bai & Yang, 2014
  - Neoserica tianeana Liu, Fabrizi, Bai, Yang & Ahrens, 2014
  - Neoserica tianmushanica Ahrens, Fabrizi & Liu, 2019
  - Neoserica tonkinea Ahrens, Liu, Fabrizi, Bai & Yang, 2014
  - Neoserica tramton Ahrens & Pham, 2021
  - Neoserica transvaalensis Péringuey, 1904
  - Neoserica transvaalica Moser, 1916
  - Neoserica trifida Ahrens, Liu, Fabrizi, Bai & Yang, 2014
  - Neoserica tsinlingensis Ahrens, Fabrizi & Liu, 2019
  - Neoserica ukereweana Moser, 1920
  - Neoserica unciforceps Ahrens & Fabrizi, 2016
  - Neoserica uncinata Brenske, 1899
  - Neoserica unicolor (Frey, 1972)
  - Neoserica uniformis Moser, 1920
  - Neoserica ursina (Brenske, 1894)
  - Neoserica usta Ahrens, Fabrizi & Liu, 2014
  - Neoserica validipes Moser, 1916
  - Neoserica variegata Moser, 1915
  - Neoserica vasta Brenske, 1899
  - Neoserica vicina Moser, 1915
  - Neoserica vulpes (Arrow, 1946)
  - Neoserica vulpina Moser, 1908
  - Neoserica weibaoshanica Liu, Fabrizi, Bai, Yang & Ahrens, 2014
  - Neoserica weishanensis Ahrens, Fabrizi & Liu, 2014
  - Neoserica weishanica Ahrens, Fabrizi & Liu, 2014
  - Neoserica weyersi (Brenske, 1900)
  - Neoserica xiaguanensis Ahrens, Fabrizi & Liu, 2014
  - Neoserica xingdoushanana Ahrens, Fabrizi & Liu, 2019
  - Neoserica xizangensis Liu & Ahrens, 2014
  - Neoserica yangjiapingensis Ahrens, Fabrizi & Liu, 2014
  - Neoserica yanshanica Ahrens, Fabrizi & Liu, 2019
  - Neoserica yanyuan Ahrens, 2023
  - Neoserica yanzigouensis Ahrens, Fabrizi & Liu, 2014
  - Neoserica yaoi Ahrens, Liu, Fabrizi, Bai & Yang, 2014
  - Neoserica yingjiangensis Ahrens, Liu, Fabrizi, Bai & Yang, 2014
  - Neoserica yongkangensis Liu & Ahrens, 2015
  - Neoserica yulongensis Ahrens, Fabrizi & Liu, 2019
  - Neoserica zanzibarica Brenske, 1902
  - Neoserica zheijangensis Liu, Fabrizi, Bai, Yang & Ahrens, 2014
  - Neoserica zhibenshanica Liu, Fabrizi, Bai, Yang & Ahrens, 2014
  - Neoserica ziyardamensis Ahrens & Fabrizi, 2016
  - Neoserica zongyuani Liu, Fabrizi, Bai, Yang & Ahrens, 2014

=== Unplaced species ===
- Neoserica minshia Lia Botjes, Dirk Ahrens, 2026
- Neoserica schillhammeri Lia Botjes, Dirk Ahrens, 2026

=== Selected former species ===
- Neoserica bombycina (Karsch, 1882)
- Neoserica costisquamosa Ahrens, Fabrizi & Liu, 2019
- Neoserica maculata Frey, 1972
- Neoserica minima Frey, 1972
- Neoserica rugosa Brenske, 1898
- Neoserica tonkinensis Moser, 1908
