= Neoserica exoleta =

Scientific classification
- Kingdom: Animalia
- Phylum: Arthropoda
- Class: Insecta
- Order: Coleoptera
- Suborder: Polyphaga
- Infraorder: Scarabaeiformia
- Family: Scarabaeidae
- Genus: Neoserica
- Species: N. exoleta

Binomial name
- Neoserica exoleta Ahrens & Fabrizi, 2009

Species of beetle

Neoserica exoleta is a species of beetle of the family Scarabaeidae. It is found in India (Arunachal Pradesh).

== Description ==
Adults reach a length of about 12.8–13 mm. They have a dark brown, oblong body. The legs are reddish brown and the antennae are yellowish brown. The dorsal surface is mostly dull and sparsely setose.

== Etymology ==
The species name is derived from Latin exoletus (meaning adult or mature).
