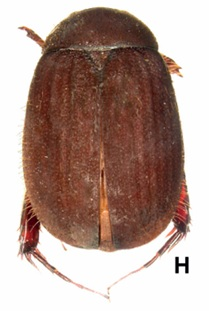

Scientific classification
- Kingdom: Animalia
- Phylum: Arthropoda
- Class: Insecta
- Order: Coleoptera
- Suborder: Polyphaga
- Infraorder: Scarabaeiformia
- Family: Scarabaeidae
- Genus: Neoserica
- Species: N. jianfenglingica

Binomial name
- Neoserica jianfenglingica Ahrens, Fabrizi & Liu, 2019

= Neoserica jianfenglingica =

Species of beetle

Neoserica jianfenglingica is a species of beetle of the family Scarabaeidae. It is found in China (Hainan).

== Description ==
Adults reach a length of about 6.8 mm. They have a dark reddish brown, oval body. The antennal club is yellowish brown and the dorsal surface is dull with numerous erect setae. The labroclypeus is shiny.

== Etymology ==
The species is named after the type locality, Jianfengling.
