= Neoserica clypeata =

Scientific classification
- Kingdom: Animalia
- Phylum: Arthropoda
- Class: Insecta
- Order: Coleoptera
- Suborder: Polyphaga
- Infraorder: Scarabaeiformia
- Family: Scarabaeidae
- Genus: Neoserica
- Species: N. clypeata

Binomial name
- Neoserica clypeata (Fairmaire, 1893)

Synonyms
- Serica clypeata Fairmaire, 1893

Species of beetle

Neoserica clypeata is a species of beetle of the family Scarabaeidae. It is found in Vietnam.

== Description ==
Adults reach a length of about 7.5 mm. They are black, very dull and strongly opalescent underneath. The clypeus is short, the corners broadly rounded, so that it is almost semicircular, slightly margined, finely densely punctate with coarse setae behind the margin. The suture is very weak, the tomentum extends beyond it. The pronotum is almost straight at the sides with angular hind angles, finely punctate, greenish-shimmering. The elytra are densely, irregularly punctate in the striae, the intervals somewhat raised, almost devoid of punctures. The pygidium is pointed and densely punctate.
