= Neoserica mengsongensis =

Scientific classification
- Kingdom: Animalia
- Phylum: Arthropoda
- Class: Insecta
- Order: Coleoptera
- Suborder: Polyphaga
- Infraorder: Scarabaeiformia
- Family: Scarabaeidae
- Genus: Neoserica
- Species: N. mengsongensis

Binomial name
- Neoserica mengsongensis Liu & Ahrens, 2015

Species of beetle

Neoserica mengsongensis is a species of beetle of the family Scarabaeidae. It is found in China (Yunnan).

== Description ==
Adults reach a length of about 6.5 mm. They have a reddish brown, oval body, with the frons and disc of the pronotum darker. The antennae and legs are yellowish brown. The dorsal surface has dense and fine, white adpressed setae and moderately dense, long erect setae on the head and pronotum.

== Etymology ==
The species is named after the type locality, Mengsong.
