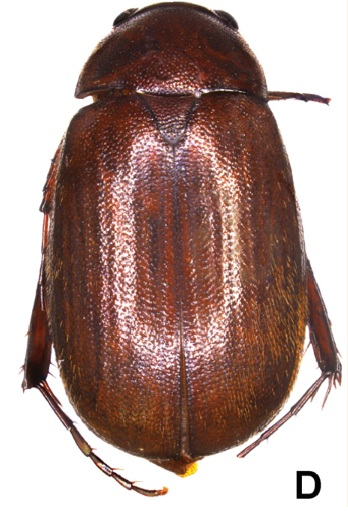

Scientific classification
- Kingdom: Animalia
- Phylum: Arthropoda
- Clade: Pancrustacea
- Class: Insecta
- Order: Coleoptera
- Suborder: Polyphaga
- Infraorder: Scarabaeiformia
- Family: Scarabaeidae
- Genus: Neoserica
- Species: N. radhanagariensis

Binomial name
- Neoserica radhanagariensis Sreedevi, Speer, Fabrizi & Ahrens, 2018

= Neoserica radhanagariensis =

Species of beetle

Neoserica radhanagariensis is a species of beetle of the family Scarabaeidae. It is found in India (Maharashtra).

== Description ==
Adults reach a length of about 7.1 mm. They have a yellowish brown, elongate body. The dorsal surface has very dense, simple pilosity, is shiny, without dull toment and is finely and densely punctate.

== Etymology ==
The species name refers to its type locality, Radhanagari.
