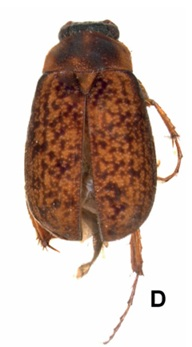

Scientific classification
- Kingdom: Animalia
- Phylum: Arthropoda
- Class: Insecta
- Order: Coleoptera
- Suborder: Polyphaga
- Infraorder: Scarabaeiformia
- Family: Scarabaeidae
- Genus: Neoserica
- Species: N. longwangshanica

Binomial name
- Neoserica longwangshanica Ahrens, Fabrizi & Liu, 2019

= Neoserica longwangshanica =

Species of beetle

Neoserica longwangshanica is a species of beetle of the family Scarabaeidae. It is found in China (Zhejiang).

== Description ==
Adults reach a length of about 5.6 mm. They have a dark yellowish brown, oblong body. The frons, two dark large spots on the pronotum and numerous small spots on the elytra are dark brown. The antennal club is yellowish brown, the dorsal surface is dull and nearly glabrous and the labroclypeus is moderately shiny.

== Etymology ==
The species is named after the type locality, Longwangshan mountain.
