= Neoserica austera =

Scientific classification
- Kingdom: Animalia
- Phylum: Arthropoda
- Clade: Pancrustacea
- Class: Insecta
- Order: Coleoptera
- Suborder: Polyphaga
- Infraorder: Scarabaeiformia
- Family: Scarabaeidae
- Genus: Neoserica
- Species: N. austera

Binomial name
- Neoserica austera Moser, 1917

Species of beetle

Neoserica austera is a species of beetle of the family Scarabaeidae. It is found in Togo.

== Description ==
Adults reach a length of about 8 mm. The upper surface is blackish-brown and the underside brown. The frons is dull, blackish-green, sparsely and finely punctate, with a few setae. The antennae are yellow. The pronotum is rather densely and finely punctate. The elytra have rows of punctures, with the intervals rather sparsely punctured. The punctures have tiny setae, and the alternating intervals are covered with a few stronger setae.
