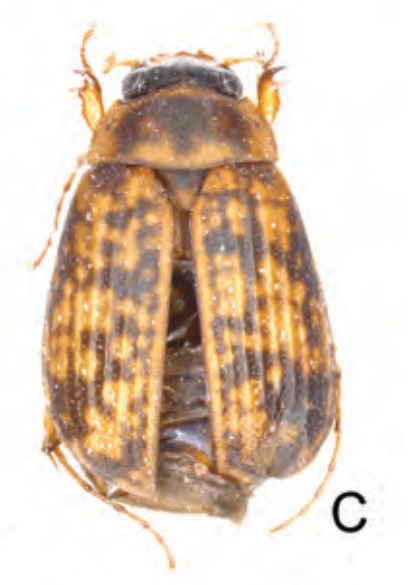

Scientific classification
- Kingdom: Animalia
- Phylum: Arthropoda
- Class: Insecta
- Order: Coleoptera
- Suborder: Polyphaga
- Infraorder: Scarabaeiformia
- Family: Scarabaeidae
- Genus: Neoserica
- Species: N. uniforceps

Binomial name
- Neoserica uniforceps Ahrens & Fabrizi, 2016

= Neoserica uniforceps =

Species of beetle

Neoserica uniforceps is a species of beetle of the family Scarabaeidae. It is found in Meghalaya, India.

== Description ==
Adults reach a length of about 5.2–5.8 mm. They have a yellowish brown, oval body. The abdomen, disc of the pronotum, scutellum, lateral margin and dots on the elytra are all dark. The dorsal surface (except for the head) is dull and nearly glabrous, except for scale-like setae on the elytra.

== Etymology ==
The species name is derived from Latin uncus (meaning hook) and forceps and refers to the morphology of the right paramere.
