= Neoserica haafi =

Scientific classification
- Kingdom: Animalia
- Phylum: Arthropoda
- Class: Insecta
- Order: Coleoptera
- Suborder: Polyphaga
- Infraorder: Scarabaeiformia
- Family: Scarabaeidae
- Genus: Neoserica
- Species: N. haafi

Binomial name
- Neoserica haafi (Frey, 1960)

Synonyms
- Lepiserica haafi Frey, 1960; Autoserica haafi

Species of beetle

Neoserica haafi is a species of beetle of the family Scarabaeidae. It is found in Tanzania.

== Description ==
Adults reach a length of about 9–10 mm. The upper and lower surfaces are black with a brownish sheen, covered with almost white scales and strongly silky-shiny. The pronotum and underside are somewhat duller.
