= Neoserica transvaalica =

Scientific classification
- Kingdom: Animalia
- Phylum: Arthropoda
- Clade: Pancrustacea
- Class: Insecta
- Order: Coleoptera
- Suborder: Polyphaga
- Infraorder: Scarabaeiformia
- Family: Scarabaeidae
- Genus: Neoserica
- Species: N. transvaalica

Binomial name
- Neoserica transvaalica Moser, 1916

Species of beetle

Neoserica transvaalica is a species of beetle of the family Scarabaeidae. It is found in South Africa (Limpopo).

== Description ==
Adults reach a length of about 9 mm. They are blackish-brown above and brown below. The frons is dull, with a few setae behind the suture and the antennae are reddish-yellow. The pronotum is quite densely covered with minutely setate punctures.
