= Neoserica bourgeoni =

Scientific classification
- Kingdom: Animalia
- Phylum: Arthropoda
- Clade: Pancrustacea
- Class: Insecta
- Order: Coleoptera
- Suborder: Polyphaga
- Infraorder: Scarabaeiformia
- Family: Scarabaeidae
- Genus: Neoserica
- Species: N. bourgeoni

Binomial name
- Neoserica bourgeoni (Moser, 1916)

Synonyms
- Autoserica bourgeoni Moser, 1916

Species of beetle

Neoserica bourgeoni is a species of beetle of the family Scarabaeidae. It is found in the Democratic Republic of the Congo.

== Description ==
Adults reach a length of about 8 mm. They are reddish-brown and dull. The pronotum has fairly dense punctation, the punctures with tiny setae and the lateral margins and the anterior margin also have setae. The elytra have rows of punctures and the intervals are sparsely covered with tiny bristled punctures. Some somewhat more distinct bristles are arranged in rows at the outer margins of the alternating intervals.
