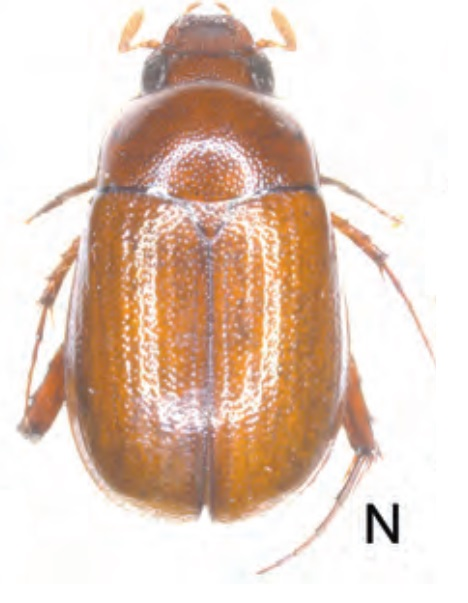

Scientific classification
- Kingdom: Animalia
- Phylum: Arthropoda
- Class: Insecta
- Order: Coleoptera
- Suborder: Polyphaga
- Infraorder: Scarabaeiformia
- Family: Scarabaeidae
- Genus: Neoserica
- Species: N. sforziae

Binomial name
- Neoserica sforziae Ahrens & Fabrizi, 2016

= Neoserica sforziae =

Species of beetle

Neoserica sforziae is a species of beetle of the family Scarabaeidae. It is found in India (Tamil Nadu).

== Description ==
Adults reach a length of about 5.8 mm. They have a reddish brown, oval body. The antennae are yellowish brown and the dorsal surface is nearly glabrous and shiny, except for some setae on the head.

== Etymology ==
The species is named after its collector, Alessandra Sforzi.
