= Neoserica saturella =

Scientific classification
- Kingdom: Animalia
- Phylum: Arthropoda
- Class: Insecta
- Order: Coleoptera
- Suborder: Polyphaga
- Infraorder: Scarabaeiformia
- Family: Scarabaeidae
- Genus: Neoserica
- Species: N. saturella

Binomial name
- Neoserica saturella Brenske, 1898

Species of beetle

Neoserica saturella is a species of beetle of the family Scarabaeidae. It is found in Myanmar.

== Description ==
Adults reach a length of about 8.5–9 mm. The clypeus is short, dull-punctate with a row of coarse bristle-like punctures, slightly tuberculate, without a raised anterior margin. The suture is very weak, the tomentum continuing over it. The pronotum is almost straight at the sides, the hind angles are angular and the surface is finely punctured, somewhat wider in the middle, sparsely and slightly wrinkled at the sides, with minute, short hairs. The elytra are coarsely punctured in the striae, the punctures almost in a row with more scattered punctures beside them, with narrow raised intervals, the first of which is wider and punctured next to the suture. The pygidium is pointed.
