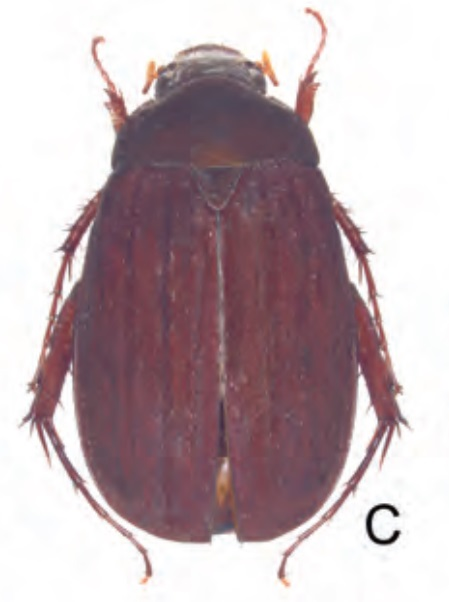

Scientific classification
- Kingdom: Animalia
- Phylum: Arthropoda
- Class: Insecta
- Order: Coleoptera
- Suborder: Polyphaga
- Infraorder: Scarabaeiformia
- Family: Scarabaeidae
- Genus: Neoserica
- Species: N. parilis

Binomial name
- Neoserica parilis Ahrens & Fabrizi, 2016

= Neoserica parilis =

Species of beetle

Neoserica parilis is a species of beetle of the family Scarabaeidae. It is found in India (Meghalaya).

== Description ==
Adults reach a length of about 12.7 mm. They have a dark brown, oblong body. The antennal club is brown and the dorsal surface is dull and sparsely setose.

== Etymology ==
The species name is derived from Latin parilis (meaning similar) and refers to the similarity with Neoserica putaoana.
