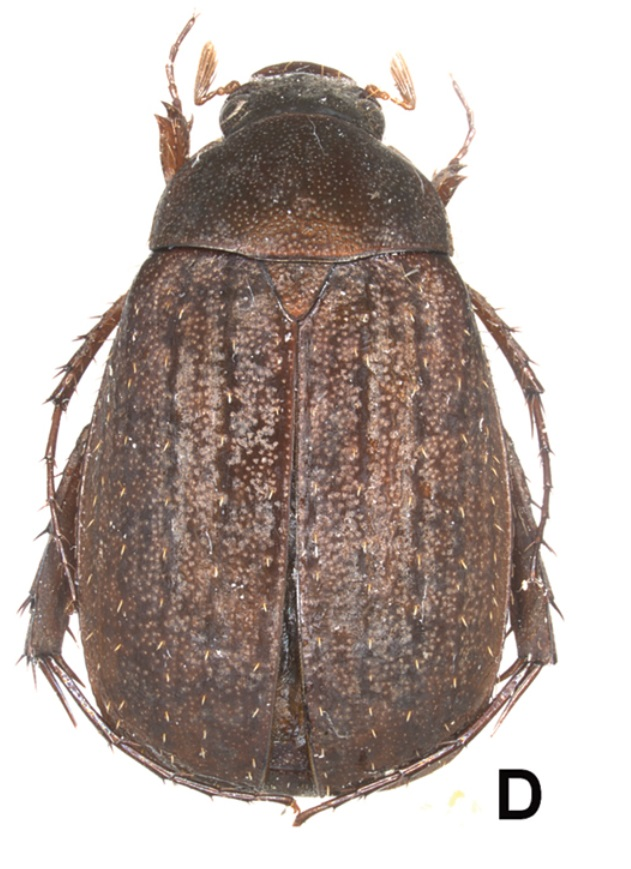

Scientific classification
- Kingdom: Animalia
- Phylum: Arthropoda
- Class: Insecta
- Order: Coleoptera
- Suborder: Polyphaga
- Infraorder: Scarabaeiformia
- Family: Scarabaeidae
- Genus: Neoserica
- Species: N. abnormoides

Binomial name
- Neoserica abnormoides Ahrens, Liu, Fabrizi, Bai & Yang, 2014

= Neoserica abnormoides =

Species of beetle

Neoserica abnormoides is a species of beetle of the family Scarabaeidae. It is found in Vietnam and China (Zhejiang).

== Description ==
Adults reach a length of about 12.5–12.7 mm. They have a dark brown, oblong body. The antennal club is yellowish brown and the anterior labroclypeus is shiny. The dorsal surface is dull and sparsely setose.

== Etymology ==
The species is named with reference to the externally similar Neoserica abnormis.
