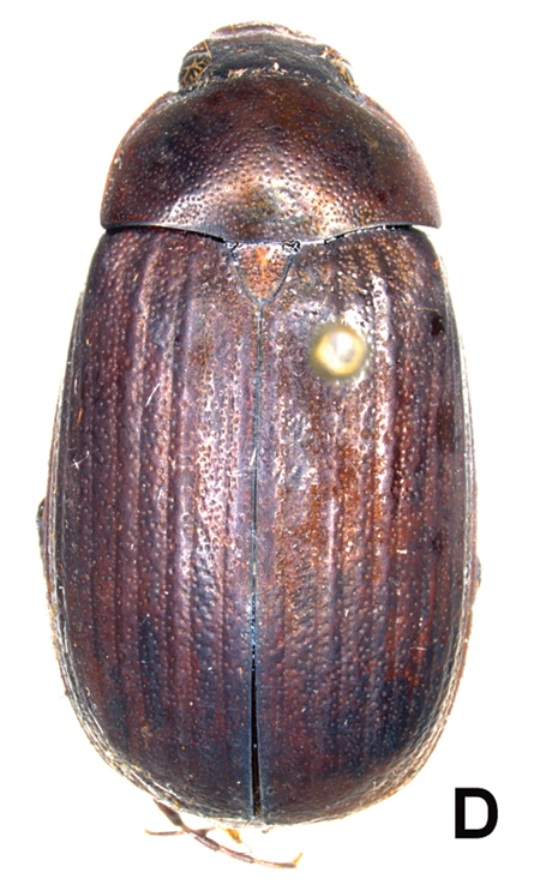

Scientific classification
- Kingdom: Animalia
- Phylum: Arthropoda
- Clade: Pancrustacea
- Class: Insecta
- Order: Coleoptera
- Suborder: Polyphaga
- Infraorder: Scarabaeiformia
- Family: Scarabaeidae
- Genus: Neoserica
- Species: N. abnormis

Binomial name
- Neoserica abnormis Moser, 1908

= Neoserica abnormis =

Species of beetle

Neoserica abnormis is a species of beetle of the family Scarabaeidae. It is found in Vietnam.

== Description ==
Adults reach a length of about 13–17 mm. They have a dark brown, oblong body. The antennal club is brown and the anterior labroclypeus is shiny. The dorsal surface is dull and sparsely setose.
