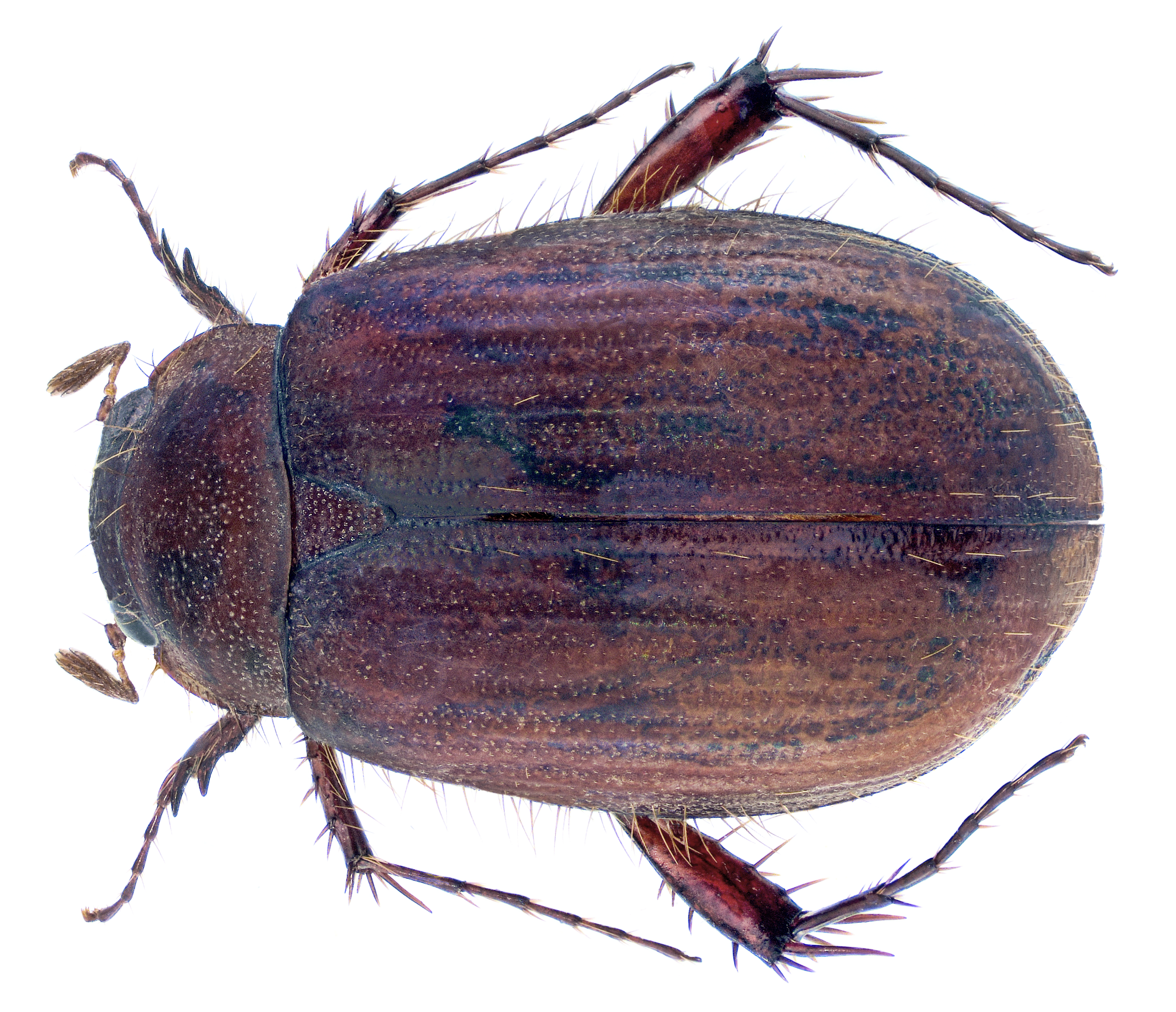

Scientific classification
- Kingdom: Animalia
- Phylum: Arthropoda
- Class: Insecta
- Order: Coleoptera
- Suborder: Polyphaga
- Infraorder: Scarabaeiformia
- Family: Scarabaeidae
- Genus: Neoserica
- Species: N. sapaensis

Binomial name
- Neoserica sapaensis Ahrens, Fabrizi & Liu, 2014

= Neoserica sapaensis =

Species of beetle

Neoserica sapaensis is a species of beetle of the family Scarabaeidae. It is found in China (Yunnan) and Vietnam.

== Description ==
Adults reach a length of about 8.9–9.9 mm. They have a dark reddish brown, oblong body. The antennal club is yellowish brown. The dorsal surface is dull and nearly glabrous, except for a few long setae on the head.

== Etymology ==
The species is named according to its type locality Sa Pa (Vietnam).
