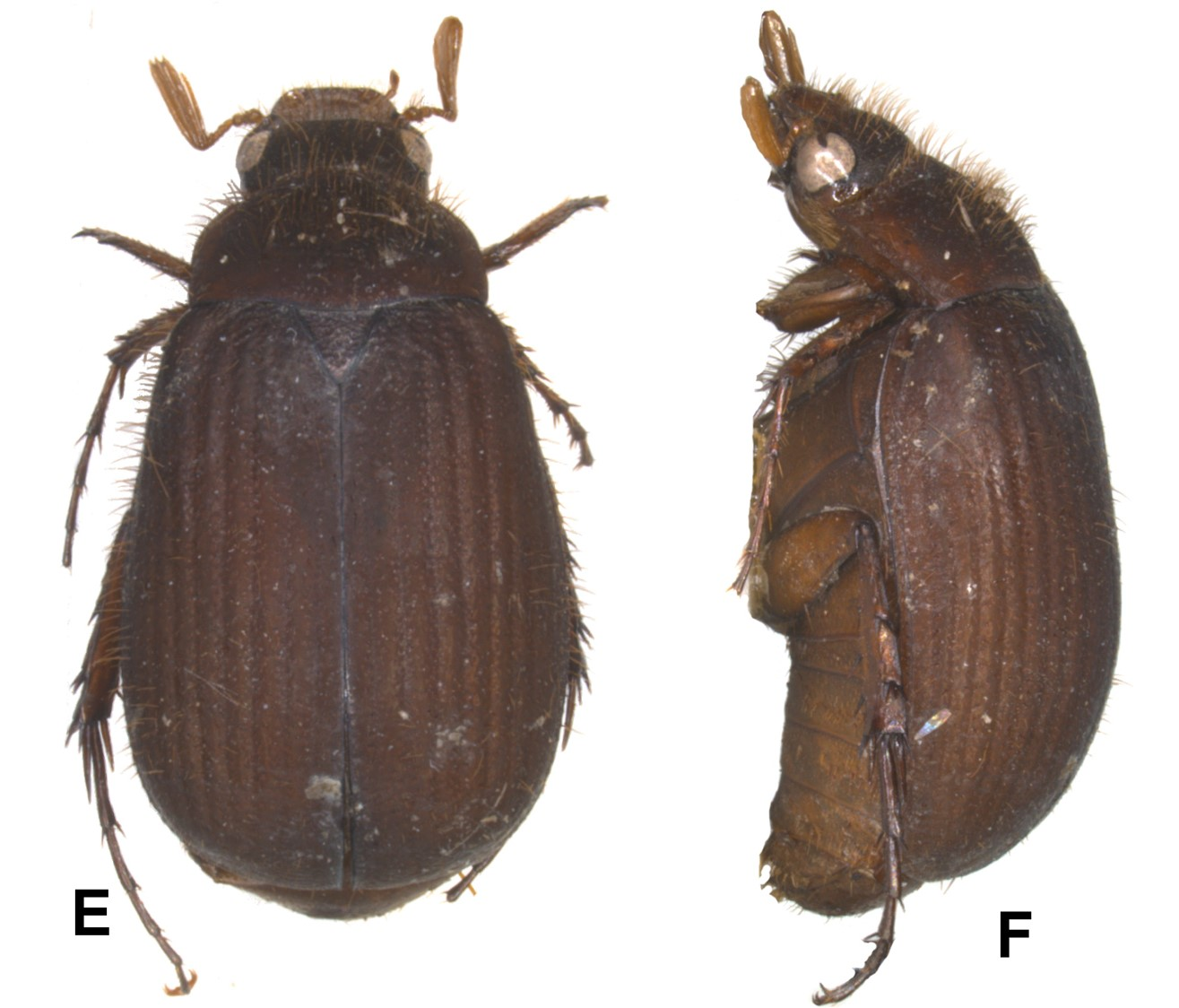

Scientific classification
- Kingdom: Animalia
- Phylum: Arthropoda
- Clade: Pancrustacea
- Class: Insecta
- Order: Coleoptera
- Suborder: Polyphaga
- Infraorder: Scarabaeiformia
- Family: Scarabaeidae
- Genus: Neoserica
- Species: N. minshia

Binomial name
- Neoserica minshia Lia Botjes & Ahrens, 2026

= Neoserica minshia =

Species of beetle

Neoserica minshia is a species of beetle of the family Scarabaeidae. It is found in Myanmar.

== Description ==
Adults reach a length of about 8.8 mm (0.35 in). They have an oblong, dark brown body. The ventral surface and antennae are yellow. The dorsal surface is dull and has dense, short and long, erect setae.

== Etymology ==
The species is named after its type locality, Minshia.
