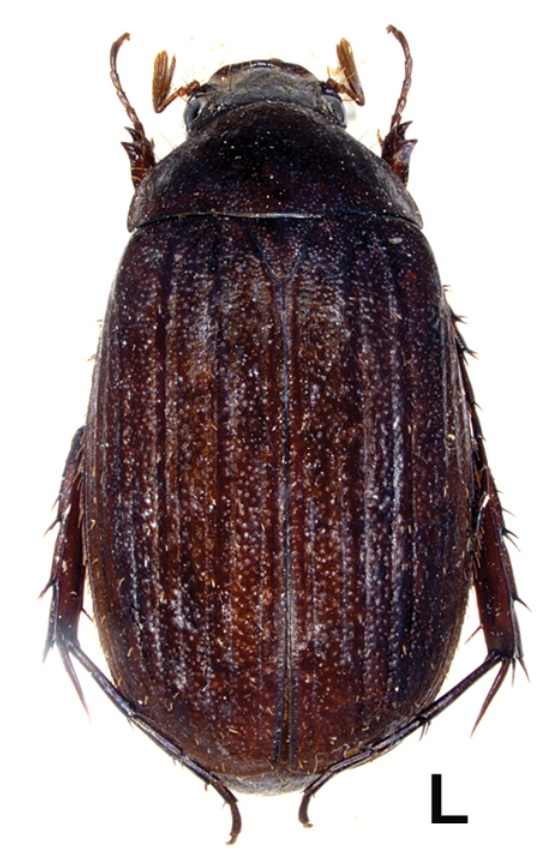

Scientific classification
- Kingdom: Animalia
- Phylum: Arthropoda
- Class: Insecta
- Order: Coleoptera
- Suborder: Polyphaga
- Infraorder: Scarabaeiformia
- Family: Scarabaeidae
- Genus: Neoserica
- Species: N. allolaotica

Binomial name
- Neoserica allolaotica Ahrens, Liu, Fabrizi, Bai & Yang, 2014

= Neoserica allolaotica =

Species of beetle

Neoserica allolaotica is a species of beetle of the family Scarabaeidae. It is found in Laos and Thailand.

== Description ==
Adults reach a length of about 12.3–14.4 mm. They have a dark brown, oblong body. The antennal club is yellowish brown and the anterior labroclypeus is shiny. The dorsal surface is dull, and the opaque toment on the elytra and pronotum is less thick, with a light trace of shine, sparsely setose.

== Etymology ==
The species is named according to its occurrence in Laos (laotica) with the Greek prefix allo- (meaning different or other) to avoid potential secondary homonymy with Neoserica laotica.
