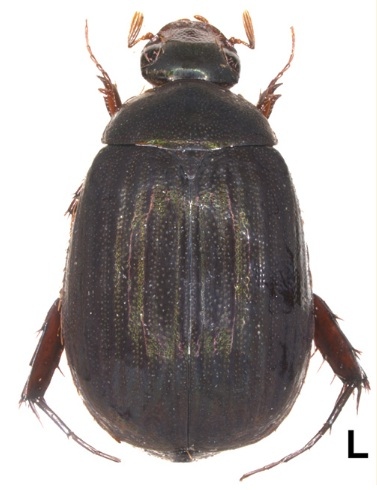

Scientific classification
- Kingdom: Animalia
- Phylum: Arthropoda
- Clade: Pancrustacea
- Class: Insecta
- Order: Coleoptera
- Suborder: Polyphaga
- Infraorder: Scarabaeiformia
- Family: Scarabaeidae
- Genus: Tetraserica
- Species: T. laotica

Binomial name
- Tetraserica laotica (Frey, 1972)

Synonyms
- Neoserica laotica Frey, 1972; Tetraserica midoriae Kobayashi, 2017

= Tetraserica laotica =

Species of beetle

Tetraserica laotica is a species of beetle of the family Scarabaeidae. It is found in Laos and Thailand.

== Description ==
Adults reach a length of about 9.8 mm. The surface of the labroclypeus and the disc of the frons are glabrous. The smooth area anterior to the eye is twice as wide as long.
