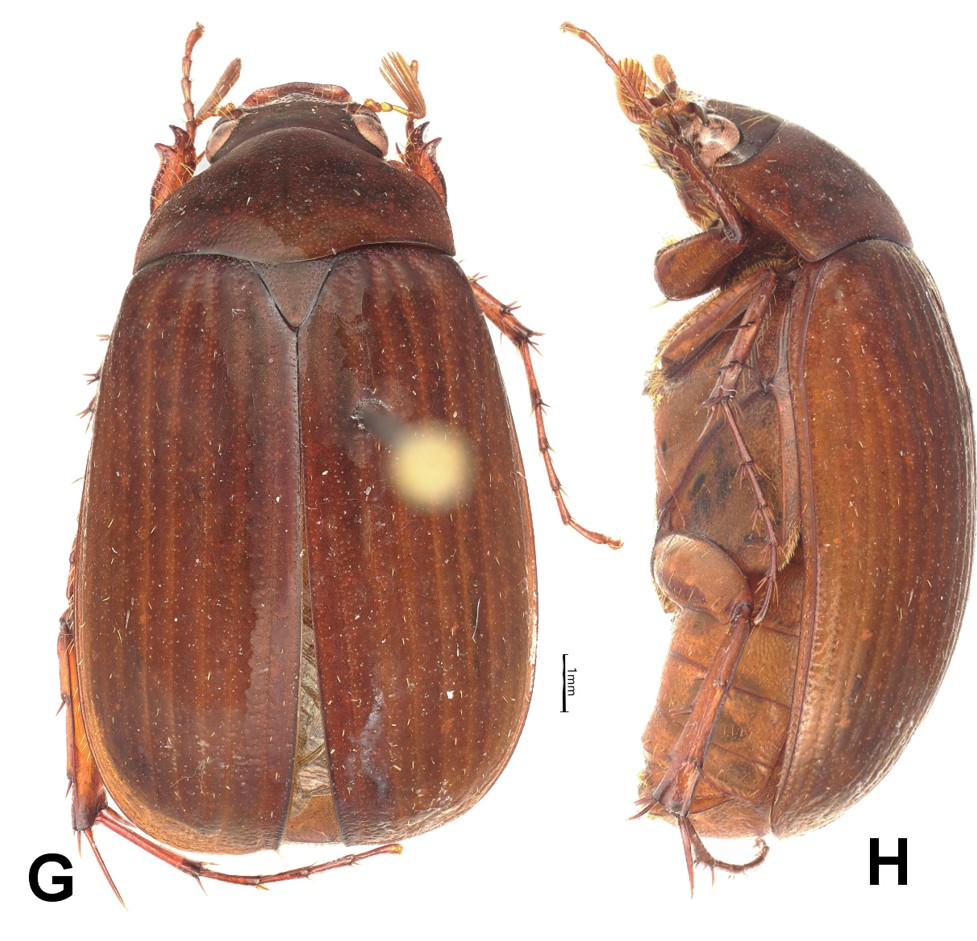

Scientific classification
- Kingdom: Animalia
- Phylum: Arthropoda
- Clade: Pancrustacea
- Class: Insecta
- Order: Coleoptera
- Suborder: Polyphaga
- Infraorder: Scarabaeiformia
- Family: Scarabaeidae
- Genus: Neoserica
- Species: N. schillhammeri

Binomial name
- Neoserica schillhammeri Lia Botjes & Ahrens, 2026

= Neoserica schillhammeri =

Species of beetle

Neoserica schillhammeri is a species of beetle of the family Scarabaeidae. It is found in Myanmar.

== Description ==
Adults reach a length of about 11.5–13.1 mm (0.45–0.52 in). They have an oblong, dark brown body. The antennal club is yellowish brown, the anterior labroclypeus shiny, and the dorsal surface dull. They are sparsely setose, and (except for a few single, short, white setae on the elytra) glabrous.

== Etymology ==
The species is named after its collector Harald Schillhammer.
