= Neoserica legitima =

Scientific classification
- Kingdom: Animalia
- Phylum: Arthropoda
- Class: Insecta
- Order: Coleoptera
- Suborder: Polyphaga
- Infraorder: Scarabaeiformia
- Family: Scarabaeidae
- Genus: Neoserica
- Species: N. legitima

Binomial name
- Neoserica legitima Brenske, 1899

Species of beetle

Neoserica legitima is a species of beetle of the family Scarabaeidae. It is found in Indonesia (Kalimantan).

== Description ==
Adults reach a length of about 12.5 mm. They are robust, dark brown and dull (but with shiny legs). The pronotum has the shape of related species such as Neoserica borneensis and Neoserica ascripticia, but the hind angles are more broadly rounded. The elytra are very densely punctate, deeply punctate in rows with sparsely punctate intervals, and with minute hairs.
