= Neoserica rubra =

Scientific classification
- Kingdom: Animalia
- Phylum: Arthropoda
- Class: Insecta
- Order: Coleoptera
- Suborder: Polyphaga
- Infraorder: Scarabaeiformia
- Family: Scarabaeidae
- Genus: Neoserica
- Species: N. rubra

Binomial name
- Neoserica rubra Brenske, 1899

Species of beetle

Neoserica rubra is a species of beetle of the family Scarabaeidae. It is found in Indonesia (Kalimantan).

== Description ==
Adults reach a length of about 11 mm. They are dull and entirely brick-red. They belong to the Neoserica borneensis group of species. The pronotum is somewhat less projecting anteriorly in the middle, the hind angles are only weakly rounded, the impression at the base on each side of the middle appears distinct here.
