= Neoserica ascripticia =

Scientific classification
- Kingdom: Animalia
- Phylum: Arthropoda
- Class: Insecta
- Order: Coleoptera
- Suborder: Polyphaga
- Infraorder: Scarabaeiformia
- Family: Scarabaeidae
- Genus: Neoserica
- Species: N. ascripticia

Binomial name
- Neoserica ascripticia Brenske, 1899

Species of beetle

Neoserica ascripticia is a species of beetle of the family Scarabaeidae. It is found in Indonesia (Kalimantan).

== Description ==
Adults reach a length of about 11 mm. They are very similar to Neoserica borneensis, but easily recognizable by its smooth, shiny hind femora and shortened hind coxae. Furthermore, the posterior margin of the pronotum is more distinctly projecting in the middle, and the setae on the segments are very sharply granular and prominent. The hind femora lack the finer punctation on the anterior margin.
