= Neoserica borneensis =

Scientific classification
- Kingdom: Animalia
- Phylum: Arthropoda
- Class: Insecta
- Order: Coleoptera
- Suborder: Polyphaga
- Infraorder: Scarabaeiformia
- Family: Scarabaeidae
- Genus: Neoserica
- Species: N. borneensis

Binomial name
- Neoserica borneensis Brenske, 1899

Species of beetle

Neoserica borneensis is a species of beetle of the family Scarabaeidae. It is found in Malaysia (Sabah).

== Description ==
Adults reach a length of about 10–11 mm. They are cherry-red brown, very dull and without opalescent sheen. The pronotum is almost straight at the sides, covered with strong bristle-like structures, the hind angles distinctly rounded, the anterior margin projected forward in the middle, the surface is finely but not very densely punctate, with tiny hairs in the punctures and there is a fine, unpunctate line in the middle. On the elytra, the striae are formed by a row of punctures, with the intervals broad, slightly convex and sparsely punctate. The lateral margin is densely setate.
