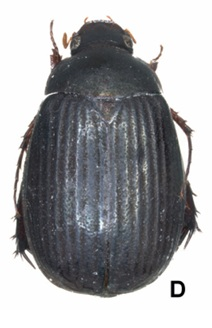

Scientific classification
- Kingdom: Animalia
- Phylum: Arthropoda
- Class: Insecta
- Order: Coleoptera
- Suborder: Polyphaga
- Infraorder: Scarabaeiformia
- Family: Scarabaeidae
- Genus: Neoserica
- Species: N. allorubiginea

Binomial name
- Neoserica allorubiginea Ahrens, Fabrizi & Liu, 2019

= Neoserica allorubiginea =

Species of beetle

Neoserica allorubiginea is a species of beetle of the family Scarabaeidae. It is found in China (Hunan) and Vietnam.

== Description ==
Adults reach a length of about 10.6–11 mm. They have a dark brown, oblong body. The antennal club is yellowish brown, the dorsal surface is dull and nearly glabrous and the anterior labroclypeus is shiny.

== Etymology ==
The name of this species is based on the combined Greek prefix allo- (meaning different to) and the species name rubiginea, with reference of its similarity to Neoserica rubiginea.
