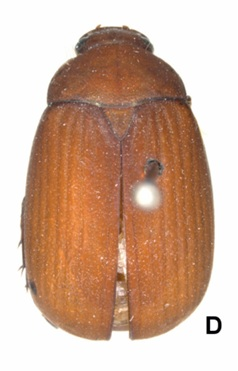

Scientific classification
- Kingdom: Animalia
- Phylum: Arthropoda
- Clade: Pancrustacea
- Class: Insecta
- Order: Coleoptera
- Suborder: Polyphaga
- Infraorder: Scarabaeiformia
- Family: Scarabaeidae
- Genus: Neoserica
- Species: N. rubiginea

Binomial name
- Neoserica rubiginea Moser, 1916

= Neoserica rubiginea =

Species of beetle

Neoserica rubiginea is a species of beetle of the family Scarabaeidae. It is found in China (Guangxi, Guizhou) and Vietnam.

== Description ==
Adults reach a length of about 9.2 mm. They have a reddish brown, oblong body. The antennal club is yellowish brown, the dorsal surface is dull and nearly glabrous and the anterior labroclypeus is shiny.
