= Neoserica kigonserana =

Scientific classification
- Kingdom: Animalia
- Phylum: Arthropoda
- Clade: Pancrustacea
- Class: Insecta
- Order: Coleoptera
- Suborder: Polyphaga
- Infraorder: Scarabaeiformia
- Family: Scarabaeidae
- Genus: Neoserica
- Species: N. kigonserana

Binomial name
- Neoserica kigonserana (Moser, 1920)

Synonyms
- Autoserica kigonserana Moser, 1920

Species of beetle

Neoserica kigonserana is a species of beetle of the family Scarabaeidae. It is found in Tanzania.

== Description ==
Adults reach a length of about 10 mm. They are similar to Neoserica ukamina in colour and shape, but is slightly larger and darker. Unlike N. ukamina, the antennae have ten segments. On the elytra, the alternating intervals show bare patches and scaled spots. The scales of the spots are of unequal size. The remaining intervals are irregularly covered with punctures, which bear very small scales of uniform size. The occasional longer, bristle-like scales found in N. ukamina are absent in this species.
