= Neoserica zoutpaniana =

Scientific classification
- Kingdom: Animalia
- Phylum: Arthropoda
- Class: Insecta
- Order: Coleoptera
- Suborder: Polyphaga
- Infraorder: Scarabaeiformia
- Family: Scarabaeidae
- Genus: Neoserica
- Species: N. zoutpaniana

Binomial name
- Neoserica zoutpaniana (Brenske, 1901)

Synonyms
- Lepiserica zoutpaniana Brenske, 1901; Autoserica zoutpaniana

Species of beetle

Neoserica zoutpaniana is a species of beetle of the family Scarabaeidae. It is found in South Africa (Limpopo).

== Description ==
Adults reach a length of about 9 mm. They have an oval, opaque body. They are brown above, somewhat spotted and opaline. Adults are very similar to Neoserica ukamina, but the scale-like hairs are finer and the hind femora and tibiae are less strong.
