= Neoserica ukamina =

Scientific classification
- Kingdom: Animalia
- Phylum: Arthropoda
- Class: Insecta
- Order: Coleoptera
- Suborder: Polyphaga
- Infraorder: Scarabaeiformia
- Family: Scarabaeidae
- Genus: Neoserica
- Species: N. ukamina

Binomial name
- Neoserica ukamina (Brenske, 1901)

Synonyms
- Lepiserica ukamina Brenske, 1901; Autoserica ukamina

Species of beetle

Neoserica ukamina is a species of beetle of the family Scarabaeidae. It is found in the Democratic Republic of the Congo and Tanzania.

== Description ==
Adults reach a length of about 8 mm. They have an oval, dull, brown body, with a greenish frons and mid-pronotum, somewhat mottled and vividly opalescent above. The pronotum is slightly tapered anteriorly, almost straight at the sides, less deeply margined at the anterior margin, which is not distinct, without a projecting middle, with distinct setae close behind the anterior margin and at the lateral margin, less punctate in the middle, with fine, white, bristly scale-like hairs at the sides, without larger ones in between, the impression of the weakly rounded middle is distinct on each side of the posterior margin. The elytra are very densely tomentose, distinctly punctate-striate, the intervals of equal width, scarcely convex, and covered alternately with punctate spots and small, smooth marks, which are very faintly prominent. Within the punctations are fine, white scales and a few scattered, more distinct scale-like hairs, but the scale covering is only faintly visible, so that the coloration of the surface is hardly altered. The scales are densest and most distinct at the base, especially near the scutellum.
