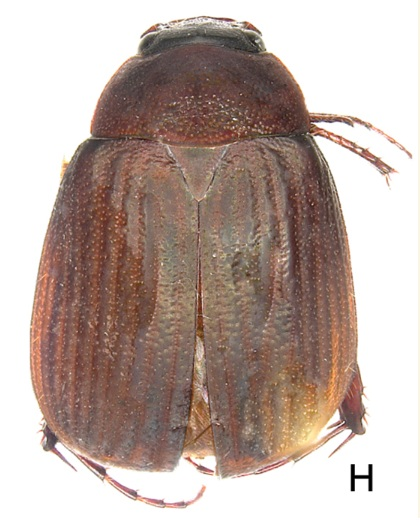

Scientific classification
- Kingdom: Animalia
- Phylum: Arthropoda
- Class: Insecta
- Order: Coleoptera
- Suborder: Polyphaga
- Infraorder: Scarabaeiformia
- Family: Scarabaeidae
- Genus: Neoserica
- Species: N. pseudosilvestris

Binomial name
- Neoserica pseudosilvestris Ahrens, Fabrizi & Liu, 2016

= Neoserica pseudosilvestris =

Species of beetle

Neoserica pseudosilvestris is a species of beetle of the family Scarabaeidae. It is found in China (Yunnan).

== Description ==
Adults reach a length of about 8 mm. They have a black to dark brown, short-oval body. The antennae are yellow and the dorsal surface (except for the labroclypeus) is dull. The pronotum and elytra are glabrous.

== Etymology ==
The name of the species is the combined Greek prefix pseudo- (meaning false) and the species name silvestris (with reference to the resemblance to Neoserica silvestris).
