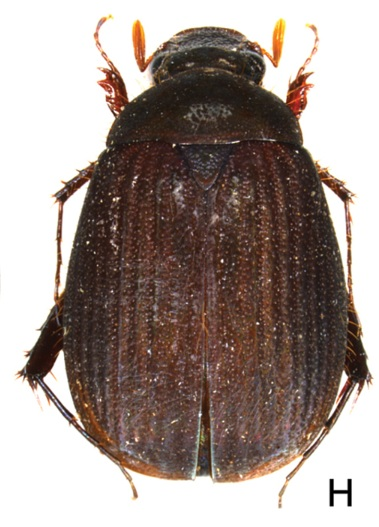

Scientific classification
- Kingdom: Animalia
- Phylum: Arthropoda
- Class: Insecta
- Order: Coleoptera
- Suborder: Polyphaga
- Infraorder: Scarabaeiformia
- Family: Scarabaeidae
- Genus: Neoserica
- Species: N. silvestris

Binomial name
- Neoserica silvestris Brenske, 1902

= Neoserica silvestris =

Species of beetle

Neoserica silvestris is a species of beetle of the family Scarabaeidae. It is found in China (Guizhou, Hubei, Hunan, Shaanxi, Shandong, Sichuan, Yunnan, Zhejiang) and Myanmar.

== Description ==
Adults reach a length of about 8.1 mm. They have a black to dark brown, short-oval body. The antennae are yellow and the dorsal surface (except for the labroclypeus) is dull or with an iridescent or greenish shine. The pronotum and elytra are glabrous.
