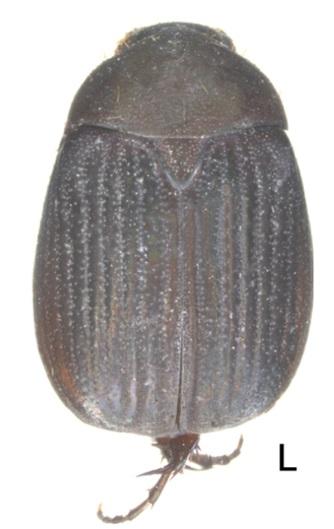

Scientific classification
- Kingdom: Animalia
- Phylum: Arthropoda
- Class: Insecta
- Order: Coleoptera
- Suborder: Polyphaga
- Infraorder: Scarabaeiformia
- Family: Scarabaeidae
- Genus: Neoserica
- Species: N. allobscura

Binomial name
- Neoserica allobscura Ahrens, Fabrizi & Liu, 2016

= Neoserica allobscura =

Species of beetle

Neoserica allobscura is a species of beetle of the family Scarabaeidae. It is found in China.

== Description ==
Adults reach a length of about 6.9 mm. They have a dark brown, short-oval body. The elytra are black. The dorsal surface (except for the anterior labroclypeus) is dull and the pronotum and elytra are glabrous.

== Etymology ==
The name of the species is derived from the Greek prefix allo- (meaning other) and the Latin adjective obscurus (meaning dark) and refers to the name and the similarity to Neoserica obscura.
