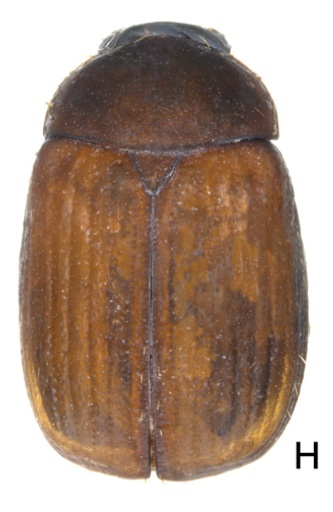

Scientific classification
- Kingdom: Animalia
- Phylum: Arthropoda
- Clade: Pancrustacea
- Class: Insecta
- Order: Coleoptera
- Suborder: Polyphaga
- Infraorder: Scarabaeiformia
- Family: Scarabaeidae
- Genus: Neoserica
- Species: N. obscura

Binomial name
- Neoserica obscura (Blanchard, 1850)

Synonyms
- Omaloplia obscura Blanchard, 1850; Microserica roeri Frey, 1972; Aserica chinensis Arrow, 1946; Maladera (Aserica) chinensis

= Neoserica obscura =

Species of beetle

Neoserica obscura is a species of beetle of the family Scarabaeidae. It is found in China (Fujian, Guangdong, Guangxi, Guizhou, Hong Kong, Hunan, Jiangxi, Zhejiang).

== Description ==
Adults reach a length of about 5.6 mm. They have a black, short-oval body. The elytra are reddish brown. The dorsal surface (except for the anterior labroclypeus) is dull and the pronotum and elytra are glabrous.
