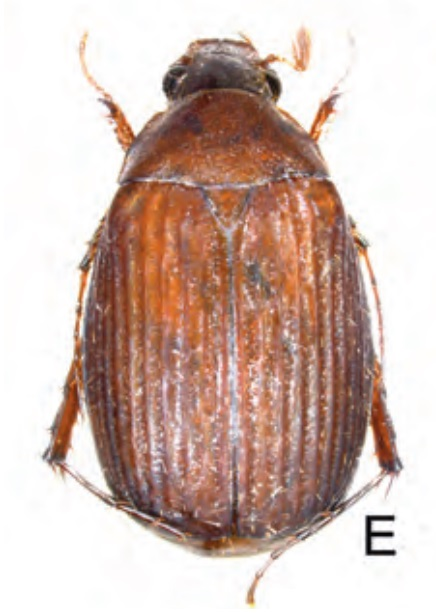

Scientific classification
- Kingdom: Animalia
- Phylum: Arthropoda
- Class: Insecta
- Order: Coleoptera
- Suborder: Polyphaga
- Infraorder: Scarabaeiformia
- Family: Scarabaeidae
- Genus: Neoserica
- Species: N. plagiata

Binomial name
- Neoserica plagiata Ahrens & Fabrizi, 2016

= Neoserica plagiata =

Species of beetle

Neoserica plagiata is a species of beetle of the family Scarabaeidae. It is found in India (Meghalaya).

== Description ==
Adults reach a length of about 10.5–11.8 mm. They have a dark brown, dull, oval body, with a light greenish shine. The antennal club is yellowish brown and the dorsal surface is sparsely setose.

== Etymology ==
The species name is derived from Latin plagiatus (meaning plagiarized) and refers to the similarity with Neoserica infamiliaris.
