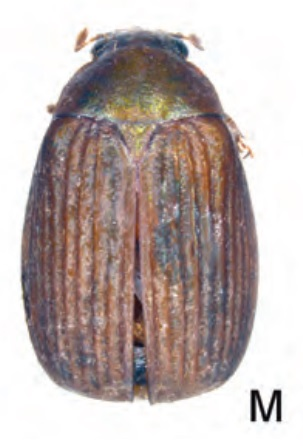

Scientific classification
- Kingdom: Animalia
- Phylum: Arthropoda
- Class: Insecta
- Order: Coleoptera
- Suborder: Polyphaga
- Infraorder: Scarabaeiformia
- Family: Scarabaeidae
- Genus: Neoserica
- Species: N. infamiliaris

Binomial name
- Neoserica infamiliaris Ahrens & Fabrizi, 2016

= Neoserica infamiliaris =

Species of beetle

Neoserica infamiliaris is a species of beetle of the family Scarabaeidae. It is found in India (Assam, Meghalaya).

== Description ==
Adults reach a length of about 10.4–11.2 mm. They have a dark brown, dull, oval body, with a light greenish shine. The antennal club is yellowish brown and the dorsal is surface sparsely setose.

== Etymology ==
The species name is derived from Latin in- (meaning un or not) and familiaris (meaning known or familiar) and refers to the particular genital morphology.
