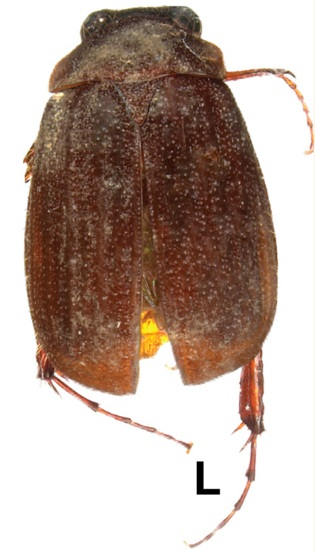

Scientific classification
- Kingdom: Animalia
- Phylum: Arthropoda
- Class: Insecta
- Order: Coleoptera
- Suborder: Polyphaga
- Infraorder: Scarabaeiformia
- Family: Scarabaeidae
- Genus: Neoserica
- Species: N. calvoides

Binomial name
- Neoserica calvoides Liu, Fabrizi, Bai, Yang & Ahrens, 2014

= Neoserica calvoides =

Species of beetle

Neoserica calvoides is a species of beetle of the family Scarabaeidae. It is found in China (Yunnan).

== Description ==
Adults reach a length of about 5.8 mm. They have a dark reddish brown, moderately oblong body. The antennal club is yellowish brown and the dorsal surface is dull and nearly glabrous, while the labroclypeus and anterior two thirds of the frons are shiny.

== Etymology ==
The species name is derived from calva and Greek oides (meaning resembling) and refers to the external similarity to Neoserica calva.
