= Neoserica senegalensis =

Scientific classification
- Kingdom: Animalia
- Phylum: Arthropoda
- Class: Insecta
- Order: Coleoptera
- Suborder: Polyphaga
- Infraorder: Scarabaeiformia
- Family: Scarabaeidae
- Genus: Neoserica
- Species: N. senegalensis

Binomial name
- Neoserica senegalensis Brenske, 1902

Species of beetle

Neoserica senegalensis is a species of beetle of the family Scarabaeidae. It is found in Senegal.

== Description ==
Adults reach a length of about 8 mm. They have an oblong-oval body. They are similar to Neoserica bibosa, but there are some setae on the vertex, the pronotum is more strongly curved outwards anteriorly, straight posteriorly, not curved. Also, the striae of the elytra are distinct, the rows of punctures are less coarse, but are separated from the punctures of the intervals.
