= Neoserica baryca =

Scientific classification
- Kingdom: Animalia
- Phylum: Arthropoda
- Class: Insecta
- Order: Coleoptera
- Suborder: Polyphaga
- Infraorder: Scarabaeiformia
- Family: Scarabaeidae
- Genus: Neoserica
- Species: N. baryca

Binomial name
- Neoserica baryca Brenske, 1902

Species of beetle

Neoserica baryca is a species of beetle of the family Scarabaeidae. It is found in Sierra Leone.

== Description ==
Adults reach a length of about 8 mm. They have an oval, dark brown, dull body, with tiny hairs in the punctures of the surface and white setae. They are very similar to Neoserica bibosa, but the clypeus is broad, very densely and very coarsely wrinkled-punctate. The frons is broader and the sides of the pronotum are more strongly rounded anteriorly. The elytra are densely punctured in the striae, but rows of punctures are hardly discernible, the somewhat convex intervals on the middle are less punctured.
