= Neoserica bibosa =

Scientific classification
- Kingdom: Animalia
- Phylum: Arthropoda
- Class: Insecta
- Order: Coleoptera
- Suborder: Polyphaga
- Infraorder: Scarabaeiformia
- Family: Scarabaeidae
- Genus: Neoserica
- Species: N. bibosa

Binomial name
- Neoserica bibosa Brenske, 1902

Species of beetle

Neoserica bibosa is a species of beetle of the family Scarabaeidae. It is found in Angola, Gabon, Ghana, the Democratic Republic of the Congo, the Republic of the Congo and Togo.

== Description ==
Adults reach a length of about 8-8.5 mm. They have a dull, egg-shaped, slightly opalescent body which is brown underneath and dark above, with a greenish sheen and brownish translucent side margins. The frons is flat, with a delicate row of setae on the vertex. The pronotum is scarcely projecting forward in the middle at the front, the sides are almost straight, slightly curved before the hind angles, with distinct marginal setae. The scutellum is large and pointed. The elytra are punctate in rows, the intervals scarcely convex, almost uniformly punctate, with minute hairs and more distinct white setae.
