= Neoserica distinguenda =

Scientific classification
- Kingdom: Animalia
- Phylum: Arthropoda
- Class: Insecta
- Order: Coleoptera
- Suborder: Polyphaga
- Infraorder: Scarabaeiformia
- Family: Scarabaeidae
- Genus: Neoserica
- Species: N. distinguenda

Binomial name
- Neoserica distinguenda (Péringuey, 1904)

Synonyms
- Autoserica distinguenda Péringuey, 1904

Species of beetle

Neoserica distinguenda is a species of beetle of the family Scarabaeidae. It is found in Zimbabwe.

== Description ==
Adults reach a length of about 7-7.5 mm. Adults are similar to Neoserica concordans, but the colour is redder all over, and the frontal part is black, the iridescent sheen is also more pronounced.
