= Neoserica concordans =

Scientific classification
- Kingdom: Animalia
- Phylum: Arthropoda
- Class: Insecta
- Order: Coleoptera
- Suborder: Polyphaga
- Infraorder: Scarabaeiformia
- Family: Scarabaeidae
- Genus: Neoserica
- Species: N. concordans

Binomial name
- Neoserica concordans (Péringuey, 1904)

Synonyms
- Autoserica concordans Péringuey, 1904

Species of beetle

Neoserica concordans is a species of beetle of the family Scarabaeidae. It is found in Zimbabwe.

== Description ==
Adults reach a length of about 6.5–7 mm. Adults are similar to Neoserica rhodesiana, but smaller and more parallel, the head, prothorax, and under side are fleshy-red, the elytra flavescent. It has a faint, silky, not iridescent sheen.
