= Neoserica rhodesiana =

Scientific classification
- Kingdom: Animalia
- Phylum: Arthropoda
- Class: Insecta
- Order: Coleoptera
- Suborder: Polyphaga
- Infraorder: Scarabaeiformia
- Family: Scarabaeidae
- Genus: Neoserica
- Species: N. rhodesiana

Binomial name
- Neoserica rhodesiana (Péringuey, 1904)

Synonyms
- Autoserica rhodesiana Péringuey, 1904

Species of beetle

Neoserica rhodesiana is a species of beetle of the family Scarabaeidae. It is found in South Africa (North West) and Zimbabwe.

== Description ==
Adults reach a length of about 8–9.75 mm. They are brownish-red with a fleshy tinge, a sericeous appearance, and a sub-opaline sheen. The club of the antennae of the males is long, but shorter than the head, and flavous. The prothorax is very faintly punctate, while the scutellum is closely punctate. The elytra are costulate with the costules somewhat raised, or moderately plane, the punctures very shallow and somewhat indistinct, but each bearing a minute greyish hair, the series of longer and very remote hairs on the alternate costules are usually obliterated on the disk, but can still be traced on the sides.
