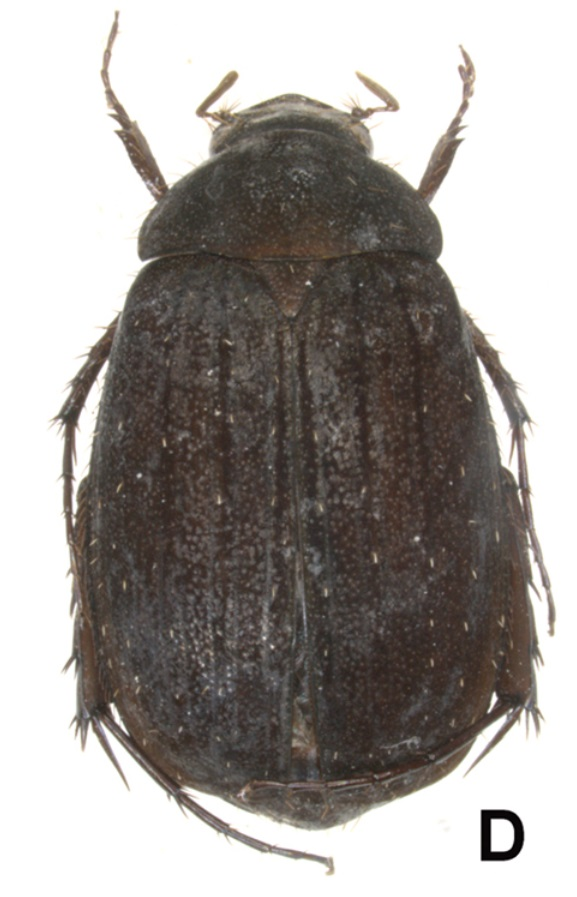

Scientific classification
- Kingdom: Animalia
- Phylum: Arthropoda
- Class: Insecta
- Order: Coleoptera
- Suborder: Polyphaga
- Infraorder: Scarabaeiformia
- Family: Scarabaeidae
- Genus: Neoserica
- Species: N. jiangxiensis

Binomial name
- Neoserica jiangxiensis Ahrens, Liu, Fabrizi, Bai & Yang, 2014

= Neoserica jiangxiensis =

Species of beetle

Neoserica jiangxiensis is a species of beetle of the family Scarabaeidae. It is found in China (Guangxi, Jiangxi).

== Description ==
Adults reach a length of about 13.5–14 mm. They have a dark brown, oblong body. The antennal club is yellowish brown and the anterior labroclypeus is shiny. The dorsal surface is dull, and the opaque toment on the elytra and pronotum is less thick, with a light trace of shine, sparsely setose.

== Etymology ==
The species is named jiangxiensis according to its occurrence in Jiangxi (China).
