= Neoserica transvaalensis =

Scientific classification
- Kingdom: Animalia
- Phylum: Arthropoda
- Class: Insecta
- Order: Coleoptera
- Suborder: Polyphaga
- Infraorder: Scarabaeiformia
- Family: Scarabaeidae
- Genus: Neoserica
- Species: N. transvaalensis

Binomial name
- Neoserica transvaalensis Péringuey, 1904

Species of beetle

Neoserica transvaalensis is a species of beetle of the family Scarabaeidae. It is found in South Africa (North West, Mpumalanga, Eastern Cape, Gauteng).

== Description ==
Adults reach a length of about 7.5–8 mm. Adults are very similar to Neoserica carneola, but have a different shape of the genital armature. Furthermore, the frontal part is more deeply and more closely punctured, and the prothorax is more deeply sinuated laterally above the basal angle.
