= Neoserica natalensis =

Scientific classification
- Kingdom: Animalia
- Phylum: Arthropoda
- Class: Insecta
- Order: Coleoptera
- Suborder: Polyphaga
- Infraorder: Scarabaeiformia
- Family: Scarabaeidae
- Genus: Neoserica
- Species: N. natalensis

Binomial name
- Neoserica natalensis Brenske, 1902

Species of beetle

Neoserica natalensis is a species of beetle of the family Scarabaeidae. It is found in South Africa (KwaZulu-Natal, Western Cape).

== Description ==
Adults reach a length of about 7–8 mm. Adults are very similar to Neoserica carneola, its colour is, however, still more flesh-like, and the sheen more pronounced. The anterior margin of the clypeus is very plainly aculeate in the centre. The antennal club of the males is more or less fuscous, and about shorter than the head by one-third.
