= Neoserica carneola =

Scientific classification
- Kingdom: Animalia
- Phylum: Arthropoda
- Class: Insecta
- Order: Coleoptera
- Suborder: Polyphaga
- Infraorder: Scarabaeiformia
- Family: Scarabaeidae
- Genus: Neoserica
- Species: N. carneola

Binomial name
- Neoserica carneola (Péringuey, 1892)

Synonyms
- Serica carneola Péringuey, 1892; Neoserica barbara Brenske, 1902

Species of beetle

Neoserica carneola is a species of beetle of the family Scarabaeidae. It is found in Namibia and South Africa (Gauteng, Mpumalanga, North West, Eastern Cape).

== Description ==
Adults reach a length of about 8-9.5 mm. They are light reddish-chestnut, with a fleshy tinge and a slight silky sheen on the upper side. The club of the antennae is reddish-yellow, that of the male flavous. The elytra are striato-punctate with the intervals not raised, and punctate, the punctures scattered.
