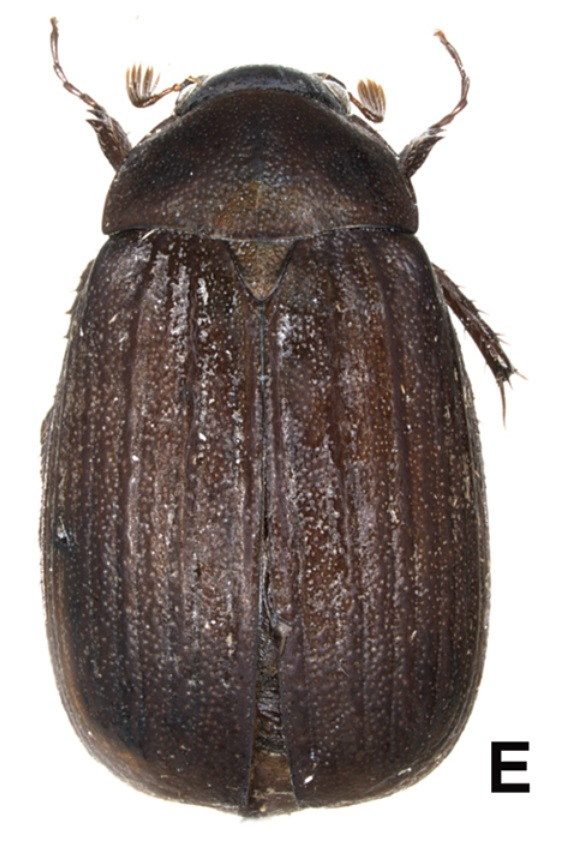

Scientific classification
- Kingdom: Animalia
- Phylum: Arthropoda
- Class: Insecta
- Order: Coleoptera
- Suborder: Polyphaga
- Infraorder: Scarabaeiformia
- Family: Scarabaeidae
- Genus: Neoserica
- Species: N. tonkinea

Binomial name
- Neoserica tonkinea Ahrens, Liu, Fabrizi, Bai & Yang, 2014

= Neoserica tonkinea =

Species of beetle

Neoserica tonkinea is a species of beetle of the family Scarabaeidae. It is found in Vietnam.

== Description ==
Adults reach a length of about 12.5–13 mm. They have a dark brown, oblong body. The antennal club is yellowish brown and the anterior labroclypeus is shiny. The dorsal surface is dull, and the opaque toment on the elytra and pronotum is less thick, with a light trace of shine, sparsely setose.

== Etymology ==
The species is named according to its occurrence in northern Vietnam, formerly during colonial times, called Tonkin.
