= Neoserica rufoplagiatoides =

Scientific classification
- Kingdom: Animalia
- Phylum: Arthropoda
- Class: Insecta
- Order: Coleoptera
- Suborder: Polyphaga
- Infraorder: Scarabaeiformia
- Family: Scarabaeidae
- Genus: Neoserica
- Species: N. rufoplagiatoides

Binomial name
- Neoserica rufoplagiatoides Ahrens & Pham, 2021

Species of beetle

Neoserica rufoplagiatoides is a species of beetle of the family Scarabaeidae. It is found in Laos.

== Description ==
Adults reach a length of about 4.4–5 mm. They have an orange brown, oval body. The head, meso- and metasternum are dark brown, while the pronotum and elytra are yellowish brown. The pronotum has two dark spot beside the anterior margin and the elytra have a dark sutural interval and dark posterior lateral intervals. The legs and antennal club are yellowish brown. The dorsal surface is mostly dull and nearly glabrous.

== Etymology ==
The species name is derived from the species name rufoplagiata and the Greek suffix -oides (meaning similar) and refers to the external similarity to Maladera rufoplagiata.
