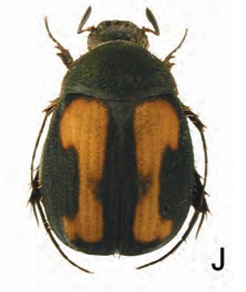

Scientific classification
- Kingdom: Animalia
- Phylum: Arthropoda
- Class: Insecta
- Order: Coleoptera
- Suborder: Polyphaga
- Infraorder: Scarabaeiformia
- Family: Scarabaeidae
- Genus: Maladera
- Species: M. rufoplagiata

Binomial name
- Maladera rufoplagiata (Fairmaire, 1893)

Synonyms
- Homaloplia rufoplagiata Fairmaire, 1893; Autoserica rufoplagiata; Autoserica birmanica Brenske, 1898

= Maladera rufoplagiata =

Species of beetle

Maladera rufoplagiata is a species of beetle of the family Scarabaeidae. It is found in China (Yunnan), northern Vietnam, eastern Nepal, India (Sikkim, Assam, Meghalaya, Arunachal Pradesh), Bhutan, Thailand, Myanmar, Laos, Cambodia and the Malay Peninsula.

== Description ==
Adults reach a length of about 4.7–5.3 mm. They have a black, short, oval body, the head and pronotum with a faint greenish shine. The elytra are yellowish to reddish-brown with black margins, and each elytron with a black spot. The upper surface is dull and glabrous, except for a few setae on the head and the lateral cilia of the pronotum and elytra.
