= Neoserica medana =

Scientific classification
- Kingdom: Animalia
- Phylum: Arthropoda
- Clade: Pancrustacea
- Class: Insecta
- Order: Coleoptera
- Suborder: Polyphaga
- Infraorder: Scarabaeiformia
- Family: Scarabaeidae
- Genus: Neoserica
- Species: N. medana

Binomial name
- Neoserica medana Moser, 1915

Species of beetle

Neoserica medana is a species of beetle of the family Scarabaeidae. It is found in Indonesia (Sumatra).

== Description ==
Adults reach a length of about 9 mm (0.35 in). They are similar to Neoserica soekarandana, but differs from this species by the much more widely spaced setae of the abdominal segments. It is dull and blackish-brown, with the thorax and legs lighter in colour. The frons is widely punctate, with a few setae next to the eyes. On the weakly wrinkled clypeus, the punctures are closer together, and a slight convexity is noticeable in the middle of the clypeus. The clypeus is tomentose at the posterior margin in front of the posteriorly curved suture. It is narrowed anteriorly, the margins are raised, and the anterior margin is weakly emarginate. The antennae are reddish-yellow. The pronotum bears a moderately dense, fine punctation, the lateral margins are setate, the anterior angles are projecting and the posterior angles are obtuse and indistinctly short-rounded. The elytra are punctate in rows and the lateral margins are setate. The pygidium is moderately densely punctate and bears a few setae along the posterior margin. The middle of the thorax bears a shallow longitudinal groove and a row of setae on either side.
