= Neoserica soekarandana =

Scientific classification
- Kingdom: Animalia
- Phylum: Arthropoda
- Class: Insecta
- Order: Coleoptera
- Suborder: Polyphaga
- Infraorder: Scarabaeiformia
- Family: Scarabaeidae
- Genus: Neoserica
- Species: N. soekarandana

Binomial name
- Neoserica soekarandana Brenske, 1899

Species of beetle

Neoserica soekarandana is a species of beetle of the family Scarabaeidae. It is found in Indonesia (Sumatra).

== Description ==
Adults reach a length of about 9–10 mm. They are very densely tomentose, cherry-brown-red and weakly opalescent. The clypeus is broad, scarcely tapered and punctate. The pronotum is slightly projecting anteriorly, the sides slightly rounded, the hind angles obtuse, with a minute hair at each puncture. The elytra are punctate almost in rows, the intervals, except for the first, are almost devoid of punctures, smoothly projecting like ribs, with minute hairs at the punctures. The pygidium is convex, not very broad and pointed.
