= Neoserica puncticeps =

Scientific classification
- Kingdom: Animalia
- Phylum: Arthropoda
- Clade: Pancrustacea
- Class: Insecta
- Order: Coleoptera
- Suborder: Polyphaga
- Infraorder: Scarabaeiformia
- Family: Scarabaeidae
- Genus: Neoserica
- Species: N. puncticeps

Binomial name
- Neoserica puncticeps Moser, 1913

Species of beetle

Neoserica puncticeps is a species of beetle of the family Scarabaeidae. It is found on the island of Java, Indonesia.

== Description ==
Adults reach a length of about 12 mm (0.47 in). They are similar to Neoserica acceptabilis, however, the hind femora are much narrower than in that species. The colouration is brown, dull, and the clypeus and legs, with the exception of the femora, are glossy. On the frons, the punctation is barely visible due to the tomentum covering. The clypeus is robust, weakly convex in the middle, with scattered erect setae. It tapers slightly anteriorly, the anterior margin is slightly emarginate. The antennae are reddish-yellow. The pronotum is moderately densely covered with ocular punctures, which are minutely setate. The middle of the anterior margin is barely perceptibly projected, whereas the acute-angled anterior angles are quite strongly projected. The scutellum is finely punctate with a smooth midline. The elytra are punctate-striate, the intervals are weakly convex and sparsely punctate. The punctures of the elytra also bear minute setae. The pygidium is dull, moderately densely covered with umbilical punctures, with several long setae before the posterior margin. The thorax is sparsely setate in the middle, the individual abdominal segments bear a transverse row of setae.
