= Neoserica acceptabilis =

Scientific classification
- Kingdom: Animalia
- Phylum: Arthropoda
- Class: Insecta
- Order: Coleoptera
- Suborder: Polyphaga
- Infraorder: Scarabaeiformia
- Family: Scarabaeidae
- Genus: Neoserica
- Species: N. acceptabilis

Binomial name
- Neoserica acceptabilis Brenske, 1899

Species of beetle

Neoserica acceptabilis is a species of beetle of the family Scarabaeidae. It is found in Indonesia (Java).

== Description ==
Adults reach a length of about 8–9 mm. They have an oblong-ovate, dark brown, entirely dull and slightly opalescent body. The pronotum projects forward in the middle at the anterior margin and is slightly curved posteriorly at the sides. The somewhat raised ribs on the elytra are unpunctate, but the rows are coarsely punctate with minute setae.
