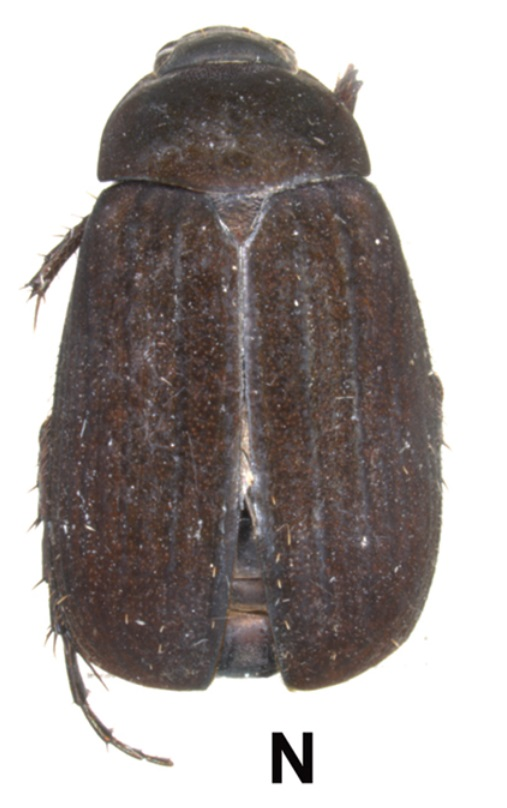

Scientific classification
- Kingdom: Animalia
- Phylum: Arthropoda
- Class: Insecta
- Order: Coleoptera
- Suborder: Polyphaga
- Infraorder: Scarabaeiformia
- Family: Scarabaeidae
- Genus: Neoserica
- Species: N. euyunnanica

Binomial name
- Neoserica euyunnanica Ahrens, Liu, Fabrizi, Bai & Yang, 2014

= Neoserica euyunnanica =

Species of beetle

Neoserica euyunnanica is a species of beetle of the family Scarabaeidae. It is found in China (Yunnan).

== Description ==
Adults reach a length of about 13–13.5 mm. They have a dark brown, oblong body. The antennal club is yellowish brown and the anterior labroclypeus is shiny. The dorsal surface is dull, and the opaque toment on the elytra and pronotum is less thick, with a light trace of shine, sparsely setose.

== Etymology ==
The species is named euyunnanica according to its occurrence in Yunnan (China).
