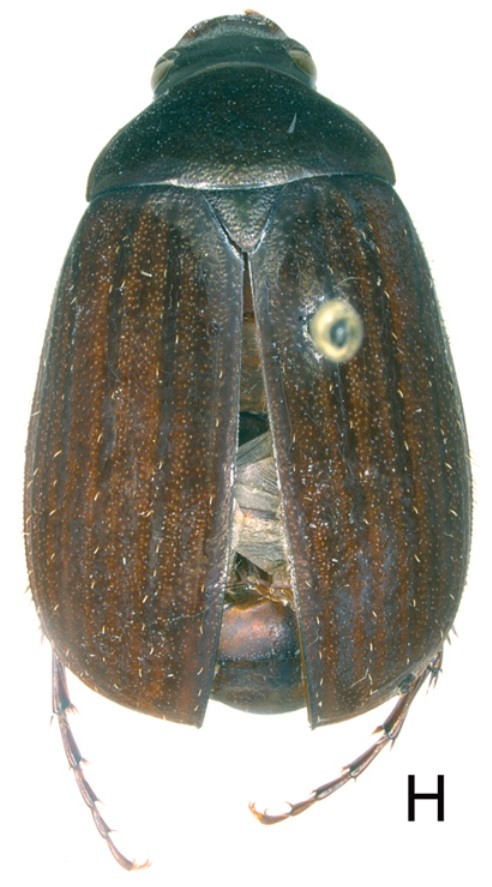

Scientific classification
- Kingdom: Animalia
- Phylum: Arthropoda
- Clade: Pancrustacea
- Class: Insecta
- Order: Coleoptera
- Suborder: Polyphaga
- Infraorder: Scarabaeiformia
- Family: Scarabaeidae
- Genus: Neoserica
- Species: N. thailandensis

Binomial name
- Neoserica thailandensis Ahrens, Liu, Fabrizi, Bai & Yang, 2014

= Neoserica thailandensis =

Species of beetle

Neoserica thailandensis is a species of beetle of the family Scarabaeidae. It is found in Thailand.

== Description ==
Adults reach a length of about 12.9–14.5 mm. They have a dark brown, oblong body. The antennal club is yellowish brown and the anterior labroclypeus is shiny. The dorsal surface is dull and sparsely setose.

== Etymology ==
The species is named thailandensis with reference to its occurrence in Thailand.
