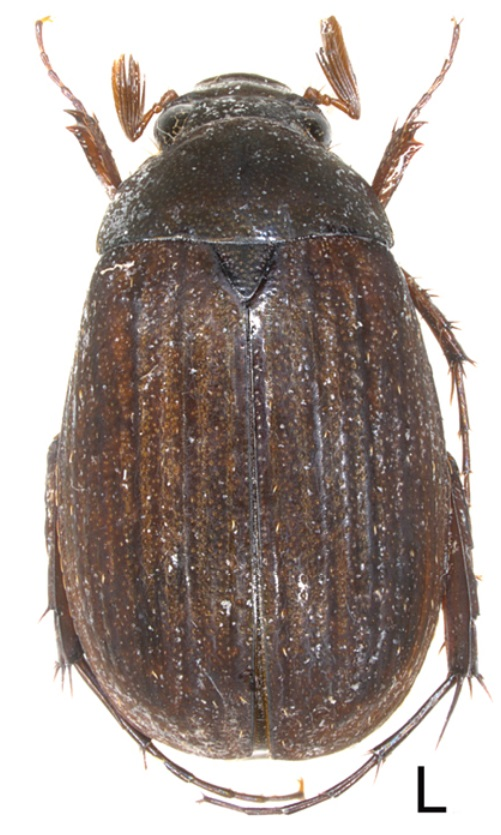

Scientific classification
- Kingdom: Animalia
- Phylum: Arthropoda
- Clade: Pancrustacea
- Class: Insecta
- Order: Coleoptera
- Suborder: Polyphaga
- Infraorder: Scarabaeiformia
- Family: Scarabaeidae
- Genus: Neoserica
- Species: N. lamellosa

Binomial name
- Neoserica lamellosa Ahrens, Liu, Fabrizi, Bai & Yang, 2014

= Neoserica lamellosa =

Species of beetle

Neoserica lamellosa is a species of beetle of the family Scarabaeidae. It is found in Vietnam.

== Description ==
Adults reach a length of about 10.25–13.6 mm. They have a dark brown, oblong body. The antennal club is yellowish brown and the anterior labroclypeus is shiny. The dorsal surface is dull, the opaque toment on the elytra and pronotum less thick, with a light trace of shine, sparsely setose.

== Etymology ==
The species name refers to the antennal club in males, which is composed of many (seven) lamellae.
