= Neoserica bedieri =

Scientific classification
- Kingdom: Animalia
- Phylum: Arthropoda
- Clade: Pancrustacea
- Class: Insecta
- Order: Coleoptera
- Suborder: Polyphaga
- Infraorder: Scarabaeiformia
- Family: Scarabaeidae
- Genus: Neoserica
- Species: N. bedieri

Binomial name
- Neoserica bedieri Moser, 1915

Species of beetle

Neoserica bedieri is a species of beetle of the family Scarabaeidae. It is found in Indonesia (Sumatra).

== Description ==
Adults reach a length of about 11 mm (0.43 in). They are similar to Neoserica weyersi, but differs from it by having broader and more strongly shortened hind tibiae. They are dull, the upper surface is blackish-brown, slightly opalescent, while the underside is somewhat lighter in colour. The clypeus is weakly wrinkled and covered with flat punctures. It is narrowed anteriorly, its anterior margin is weakly emarginate. The dull frons is finely punctured and the antennae are brown. The pronotum is densely punctured, the punctures showing tiny setae. The elytra bear rows of punctures and the weakly convex spaces between them are sparsely punctured, and the punctures are minutely bristled. The pygidium is very slightly wrinkled and moderately densely covered with umbilical punctures. The center of the thorax bears a longitudinal groove, and on either side of it, a row of bristly punctures.
