= Neoserica weyersi =

Scientific classification
- Kingdom: Animalia
- Phylum: Arthropoda
- Class: Insecta
- Order: Coleoptera
- Suborder: Polyphaga
- Infraorder: Scarabaeiformia
- Family: Scarabaeidae
- Genus: Neoserica
- Species: N. weyersi

Binomial name
- Neoserica weyersi (Brenske, 1900)

Synonyms
- Autoserica weyersi Brenske, 1900

Species of beetle

Neoserica weyersi is a species of beetle of the family Scarabaeidae. It is found in Indonesia (Sumatra).

== Description ==
Adults reach a length of about 10–11 mm. They are dull, very dark brown, with or without a faint opalescent sheen. The tomentum of the frons is sharply defined at the suture. The pronotum is short, slightly projecting anteriorly in the middle, the sides gradually rounded posteriorly and the surface finely punctate. The elytra are punctate in rows, with the intervals broad, weakly convex and widely punctate.
