= Neoserica ibemboana =

Scientific classification
- Kingdom: Animalia
- Phylum: Arthropoda
- Class: Insecta
- Order: Coleoptera
- Suborder: Polyphaga
- Infraorder: Scarabaeiformia
- Family: Scarabaeidae
- Genus: Neoserica
- Species: N. ibemboana

Binomial name
- Neoserica ibemboana (Brenske, 1902)

Synonyms
- Lepiserica ibemboana Brenske, 1902; Autoserica ibemboana

Species of beetle

Neoserica ibemboana is a species of beetle of the family Scarabaeidae. It is found in the Democratic Republic of the Congo.

== Description ==
Adults reach a length of about 7 mm. They are very similar to Neoserica zenkeri in shape and colour. There are also dull, darker above and somewhat browner below. The pronotum is somewhat longer, more deeply emarginate anteriorly with a slightly projecting center. The elytra are less elongate, more oval, slightly opalescent, more broadly rounded and blunter posteriorly. The ribs are distinct, and here too the second and fourth ribs are broader. The setae are distinct, but the small, light hairs are very indistinct.
