= Neoserica zenkeri =

Scientific classification
- Kingdom: Animalia
- Phylum: Arthropoda
- Class: Insecta
- Order: Coleoptera
- Suborder: Polyphaga
- Infraorder: Scarabaeiformia
- Family: Scarabaeidae
- Genus: Neoserica
- Species: N. zenkeri

Binomial name
- Neoserica zenkeri (Brenske, 1902)

Synonyms
- Lepiserica zenkeri Lansberge, 1886; Autoserica zenkeri

Species of beetle

Neoserica zenkeri is a species of beetle of the family Scarabaeidae. It is found in Cameroon.

== Description ==
Adults reach a length of about 7 mm. The pronotum is distinctly transverse, considerably wider posteriorly, not projecting forward in the middle at the anterior margin, the sides weakly rounded anteriorly, somewhat more reddish-brown at the margin than in the darker center. The elytra are somewhat elongate, slightly pointed at the apex and not obliquely truncated, with distinct ribs, of which the second and fourth are broader. The intervals are somewhat more reddish-brown than the ribs. Pale hairs are present, but weak and not very prominent. The scattered setae are more distinct.
