= Neoserica sulcigera =

Scientific classification
- Kingdom: Animalia
- Phylum: Arthropoda
- Clade: Pancrustacea
- Class: Insecta
- Order: Coleoptera
- Suborder: Polyphaga
- Infraorder: Scarabaeiformia
- Family: Scarabaeidae
- Genus: Neoserica
- Species: N. sulcigera

Binomial name
- Neoserica sulcigera (Moser, 1917)

Synonyms
- Autoserica sulcigera Moser, 1917

Species of beetle

Neoserica sulcigera is a species of beetle of the family Scarabaeidae. It is found in Zimbabwe.

== Description ==
Adults reach a length of about 9 mm. They are similar in color and shape to Neoserica ciliaticollis, but slightly smaller. The tomentum covering is thinner, giving it a somewhat silky sheen. The frons is rather densely punctate, more strongly punctate anteriorly than posteriorly and the antennae are yellowish-brown. The pronotum is densely punctate, and the lateral and anterior margins are fringed with yellow hairs. The elytra have rows of punctures, and the intervals are densely covered with punctures. Isolated setae are arranged in rows.
