= Neoserica ciliaticollis =

Scientific classification
- Kingdom: Animalia
- Phylum: Arthropoda
- Clade: Pancrustacea
- Class: Insecta
- Order: Coleoptera
- Suborder: Polyphaga
- Infraorder: Scarabaeiformia
- Family: Scarabaeidae
- Genus: Neoserica
- Species: N. ciliaticollis

Binomial name
- Neoserica ciliaticollis (Moser, 1917)

Synonyms
- Autoserica ciliaticollis Moser, 1917

Species of beetle

Neoserica ciliaticollis is a species of beetle of the family Scarabaeidae. It is found in Zimbabwe.

== Description ==
Adults reach a length of about 10 mm. They have a brown, dull, oblong body. The frons is dull and finely punctured, and has a few setae beside the eyes. The antennae are yellowish-brown. The pronotum is rather densely and finely punctured and the anterior and lateral margins are covered with brown setae. The elytra have rows of punctures, with the spaces between them rather widely punctured. The alternating spaces have several longer setae, while the lateral margins have strong setae.
