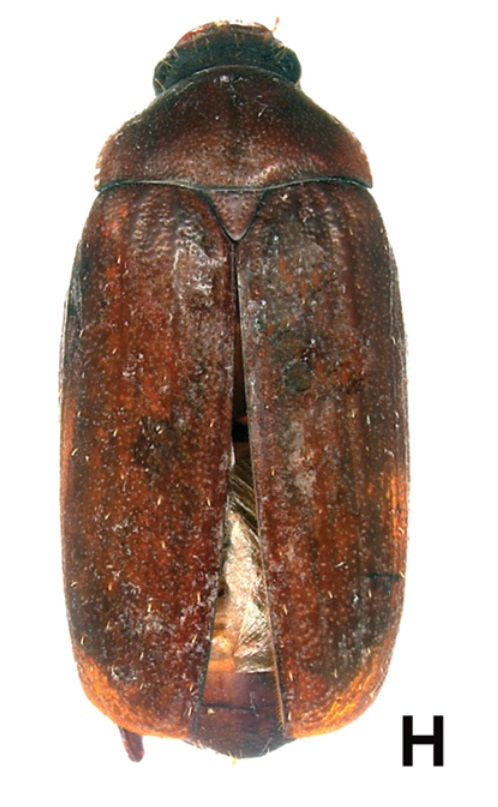

Scientific classification
- Kingdom: Animalia
- Phylum: Arthropoda
- Class: Insecta
- Order: Coleoptera
- Suborder: Polyphaga
- Infraorder: Scarabaeiformia
- Family: Scarabaeidae
- Genus: Neoserica
- Species: N. yaoi

Binomial name
- Neoserica yaoi Ahrens, Liu, Fabrizi, Bai & Yang, 2014

= Neoserica yaoi =

Species of beetle

Neoserica yaoi is a species of beetle of the family Scarabaeidae. It is found in China (Guanxi, Yunnan).

== Description ==
Adults reach a length of about 13.5–14.4 mm. They have a dark brown, oblong body. The antennal club is brown and the anterior labroclypeus is shiny. The dorsal surface is dull and sparsely setose.

== Etymology ==
The species is named after one of its collectors, Yao Jian.
