= Neoserica desquamifera =

Scientific classification
- Kingdom: Animalia
- Phylum: Arthropoda
- Class: Insecta
- Order: Coleoptera
- Suborder: Polyphaga
- Infraorder: Scarabaeiformia
- Family: Scarabaeidae
- Genus: Neoserica
- Species: N. desquamifera

Binomial name
- Neoserica desquamifera (Brenske, 1901)

Synonyms
- Lepiserica desquamifera Brenske, 1901; Autoserica desquamifera

Species of beetle

Neoserica desquamifera is a species of beetle of the family Scarabaeidae. It is found in Cameroon.

== Description ==
Adults reach a length of about 5.8 mm. They are uniformly brownish, with fine, inconspicuous scales on the upper surface, and setae on the underside. The frons has a fine longitudinal line. The pronotum and elytra are like those of Neoserica desquamata, but the small, hair-like scales are somewhat more distinct here.
