= Neoserica desquamata =

Scientific classification
- Kingdom: Animalia
- Phylum: Arthropoda
- Class: Insecta
- Order: Coleoptera
- Suborder: Polyphaga
- Infraorder: Scarabaeiformia
- Family: Scarabaeidae
- Genus: Neoserica
- Species: N. desquamata

Binomial name
- Neoserica desquamata (Brenske, 1901)

Synonyms
- Lepiserica desquamata Brenske, 1901; Autoserica desquamata

Species of beetle

Neoserica desquamata is a species of beetle of the family Scarabaeidae. It is found in Togo.

== Description ==
Adults reach a length of about 6.5 mm. They are glabrous underneath, somewhat darker brown above, scarcely spotted on the elytra and very finely scale-like. The frons is deeply and dully tomentose. The pronotum is only slightly rounded at the front, slightly widened posteriorly, the hind angles slightly rounded, finely punctate with very fine, almost tiny setae within the punctures. The scutellum is large, the middle smooth, the sides densely covered, but with minute scales. The same applies to the base of the elytra. The elytra are punctate in rows, scarcely convex, but with bare, inconspicuous spots on some of the intervals, otherwise with a few fine scale-like hairs, to which some distinct white scales are added laterally.
