= Neoserica luzonica =

Scientific classification
- Kingdom: Animalia
- Phylum: Arthropoda
- Clade: Pancrustacea
- Class: Insecta
- Order: Coleoptera
- Suborder: Polyphaga
- Infraorder: Scarabaeiformia
- Family: Scarabaeidae
- Genus: Neoserica
- Species: N. luzonica

Binomial name
- Neoserica luzonica Moser, 1915

Species of beetle

Neoserica luzonica is a species of beetle of the family Scarabaeidae. It is found in the Philippines (Luzon).

== Description ==
Adults reach a length of about 7.5–8 mm. The colour and shape is similar to Neoserica setiventris, from which it differs in that each abdominal segment has only one row of setae. The head is fairly densely covered with weak punctures and has isolated setae. The antennae are brown. The pronotum is quite densely covered with fine punctures, which (as well as the punctures of the elytra) have very tiny setae. The lateral margins of the pronotum have strong setae. The elytra are very slightly longitudinally furrowed and covered in stripes with irregular rows of punctures, while the spaces between them are almost without punctures.
