= Neoserica setiventris =

Scientific classification
- Kingdom: Animalia
- Phylum: Arthropoda
- Clade: Pancrustacea
- Class: Insecta
- Order: Coleoptera
- Suborder: Polyphaga
- Infraorder: Scarabaeiformia
- Family: Scarabaeidae
- Genus: Neoserica
- Species: N. setiventris

Binomial name
- Neoserica setiventris Moser, 1913

Species of beetle

Neoserica setiventris is a species of beetle of the family Scarabaeidae. It is found in the Philippines (Laguna).

== Description ==
Adults reach a length of about 8 mm. They upper surface is blackish-brown and dull, with the elytra somewhat darker. The head is sparsely punctate and bears a few erect setae. The pronotum is moderately densely punctate, and the punctures, like those of the scutellum and elytra, have minute setae. A few long setae are present along the anterior margin. The elytra are striate. The punctures on the elytra are irregular, very few on the ribs, and somewhat closer together between the ribs.
