= Neoserica ruficeps =

Scientific classification
- Kingdom: Animalia
- Phylum: Arthropoda
- Clade: Pancrustacea
- Class: Insecta
- Order: Coleoptera
- Suborder: Polyphaga
- Infraorder: Scarabaeiformia
- Family: Scarabaeidae
- Genus: Neoserica
- Species: N. ruficeps

Binomial name
- Neoserica ruficeps (Moser, 1916)

Synonyms
- Autoserica ruficeps Moser, 1916

Species of beetle

Neoserica ruficeps is a species of beetle of the family Scarabaeidae. It is found in the Democratic Republic of the Congo.

== Description ==
Adults reach a length of about 7 mm. They are very similar to Neoserica ealana. The pronotum is similarly shaped and sculpted as in N. ealana, with setae covering the lateral margins. The scutellum and elytra are also similarly shaped, but the scales on the elytra are more widely spaced than in N. ealana. Unlike N. ealana, the middle of the thorax bears setae on both sides of the incised longitudinal line.
