= Neoserica ealana =

Scientific classification
- Kingdom: Animalia
- Phylum: Arthropoda
- Clade: Pancrustacea
- Class: Insecta
- Order: Coleoptera
- Suborder: Polyphaga
- Infraorder: Scarabaeiformia
- Family: Scarabaeidae
- Genus: Neoserica
- Species: N. ealana

Binomial name
- Neoserica ealana (Moser, 1916)

Synonyms
- Autoserica ealana Moser, 1916

Species of beetle

Neoserica ealana is a species of beetle of the family Scarabaeidae. It is found in the Democratic Republic of the Congo.

== Description ==
Adults reach a length of about 6.5–7 mm. They are dull and darker above, but lighter brown below. The frons is blackish-green or blackish-brown, dull and sparsely punctate. The antennae are yellowish-brown. The pronotum is moderately densely covered with punctures, bearing small scales. The anterior angles are densely scaly. The elytra are rather sparsely punctured, the punctures with small scales, while isolated, somewhat larger scales are arranged in rows.
