= Neoserica litoralis =

Scientific classification
- Kingdom: Animalia
- Phylum: Arthropoda
- Clade: Pancrustacea
- Class: Insecta
- Order: Coleoptera
- Suborder: Polyphaga
- Infraorder: Scarabaeiformia
- Family: Scarabaeidae
- Genus: Neoserica
- Species: N. litoralis

Binomial name
- Neoserica litoralis Moser, 1916

Species of beetle

Neoserica litoralis is a species of beetle of the family Scarabaeidae. It is found in Tanzania.

== Description ==
Adults reach a length of about 8 mm. They ares similar in colouration and shape to Neoserica kilimandscharoana. The frons is dull, sparsely punctate and sparsely setate and the antennae are yellowish-brown. The pronotum is moderately densely and finely punctate, the punctures on the sides with minute setae and occasionally longer setae. The lateral margins are setate. The elytra have rows of punctures, with the spaces between them weakly convex and widely punctate. The punctures have very short setae, with a few longer setae.
