= Neoserica kilimandscharoana =

Scientific classification
- Kingdom: Animalia
- Phylum: Arthropoda
- Class: Insecta
- Order: Coleoptera
- Suborder: Polyphaga
- Infraorder: Scarabaeiformia
- Family: Scarabaeidae
- Genus: Neoserica
- Species: N. kilimandscharoana

Binomial name
- Neoserica kilimandscharoana Brenske, 1902

Species of beetle

Neoserica kilimandscharoana is a species of beetle of the family Scarabaeidae. It is found in Tanzania.

== Description ==
Adults reach a length of about 7.5–8.5 mm. They have a reddish-brown, dull, oblong-ovate body. The frons has short setae behind the suture. The pronotum is relatively long, straight at the sides, finely curved posteriorly before the corners, with distinct marginal setae and sharp posterior angles. The surface is finely punctate. The scutellum is small. The elytra are irregularly punctate in the striae. The striae are not deep and the intervals are narrow and shallow, scarcely punctate-free, the first distinctly wider.
