= Neoserica lombokensis =

Scientific classification
- Kingdom: Animalia
- Phylum: Arthropoda
- Clade: Pancrustacea
- Class: Insecta
- Order: Coleoptera
- Suborder: Polyphaga
- Infraorder: Scarabaeiformia
- Family: Scarabaeidae
- Genus: Neoserica
- Species: N. lombokensis

Binomial name
- Neoserica lombokensis (Moser, 1916)

Synonyms
- Autoserica lombokensis Moser, 1916

Species of beetle

Neoserica lombokensis is a species of beetle of the family Scarabaeidae. It is found in Indonesia (Lombok).

== Description ==
Adults reach a length of about 7.5 mm. They are similar to Maladera floresina, but may be distinguished by the sculpture of the head. The frons is not tomentose and irregularly punctate. The antennae are reddish-yellow. The pronotum has a moderate dense punctation and setate lateral margins. The elytra are slightly furrowed and rather sparsely punctate.
