= Maladera floresina =

Scientific classification
- Kingdom: Animalia
- Phylum: Arthropoda
- Class: Insecta
- Order: Coleoptera
- Suborder: Polyphaga
- Infraorder: Scarabaeiformia
- Family: Scarabaeidae
- Genus: Maladera
- Species: M. floresina

Binomial name
- Maladera floresina (Brenske, 1899)

Synonyms
- Autoserica floresina Brenske, 1899

Species of beetle

Maladera floresina is a species of beetle of the family Scarabaeidae. It is found in Indonesia (Flores).

== Description ==
Adults reach a length of about 6.5–8 mm. They have an oblong-ovate, dull, brownish-red body, with the back of the head dark. The clypeus is broad, finely punctate with bristled punctures and a slight elevation in the middle. The pronotum is not projecting anteriorly, the sides are weakly rounded with sharply angular hind angles. The elytra have fine rows of punctures and irregular punctures in the striae, with intervals broad and flat, with some bristled punctures on the sides. The pygidium is pointed and finely punctate.
