= Neoserica bruneica =

Scientific classification
- Kingdom: Animalia
- Phylum: Arthropoda
- Class: Insecta
- Order: Coleoptera
- Suborder: Polyphaga
- Infraorder: Scarabaeiformia
- Family: Scarabaeidae
- Genus: Neoserica
- Species: N. bruneica

Binomial name
- Neoserica bruneica Brenske, 1899

Species of beetle

Neoserica bruneica is a species of beetle of the family Scarabaeidae. It is found in Brunei.

== Description ==
Adults reach a length of about 9.5 mm. They are very similar to Maladera spissa, only slightly less robust, of the same colour, dull and faintly opalescent. The thorax is less densely covered with hairs, which are short and less conspicuous, and even sparser in the female than in the male. On the elytra, the intervals are less raised, the minute hairs less distinct than in M. spissa.
