= Maladera spissa =

Scientific classification
- Kingdom: Animalia
- Phylum: Arthropoda
- Class: Insecta
- Order: Coleoptera
- Suborder: Polyphaga
- Infraorder: Scarabaeiformia
- Family: Scarabaeidae
- Genus: Maladera
- Species: M. spissa

Binomial name
- Maladera spissa (Brenske, 1899)

Synonyms
- Autoserica spissa Brenske, 1899

Species of beetle

Maladera spissa is a species of beetle of the family Scarabaeidae. It is found in Malaysia (Sarawak).

== Description ==
Adults reach a length of about 8.5–11 mm. They are dull, dark cherry-red and weakly opalescent. The pronotum is very slightly rounded at the sides and strongly setate, the anterior margin is slightly projecting in the middle, the posterior angles are almost broadly rounded, the surface is rather densely punctured, with minute short hairs. The scutellum is pointed and unpunctured in the middle. The elytra are punctured in rows, alongside which are irregular, dense, coarse punctures, the intervals are somewhat raised, scarcely punctured with minute short hairs and strong marginal setae, and a row of setate punctures alongside them on the striae.
