= Neoserica rufiventris =

Scientific classification
- Kingdom: Animalia
- Phylum: Arthropoda
- Clade: Pancrustacea
- Class: Insecta
- Order: Coleoptera
- Suborder: Polyphaga
- Infraorder: Scarabaeiformia
- Family: Scarabaeidae
- Genus: Neoserica
- Species: N. rufiventris

Binomial name
- Neoserica rufiventris (Moser, 1924)

Synonyms
- Autoserica rufiventris Moser, 1924

Species of beetle

Neoserica rufiventris is a species of beetle of the family Scarabaeidae. It is found in the Democratic Republic of the Congo.

== Description ==
Adults reach a length of about 9 mm (0.35 in). They are similar to Neoserica konduensis. They are dark brown above, and reddish-brown below. The antennae are reddish-yellow. The prothorax has slightly curved and ciliate sides, and the anterior angles acute and produced, while the posterior angles are obtuse and briefly rounded. The elytra are lightly furrowed, moderately closely punctate, with some punctures bearing small setae, and the sides of the elytra are setose. The pygidium is punctate.
