= Neoserica konduensis =

Scientific classification
- Kingdom: Animalia
- Phylum: Arthropoda
- Clade: Pancrustacea
- Class: Insecta
- Order: Coleoptera
- Suborder: Polyphaga
- Infraorder: Scarabaeiformia
- Family: Scarabaeidae
- Genus: Neoserica
- Species: N. konduensis

Binomial name
- Neoserica konduensis (Moser, 1916)

Synonyms
- Autoserica konduensis Moser, 1916

Species of beetle

Neoserica konduensis is a species of beetle of the family Scarabaeidae. It is found in the Democratic Republic of the Congo.

== Description ==
Adults reach a length of about 9 mm. They are dull, black above and dark reddish-brown below. The antennae are yellowish-red. The pronotum is moderately densely covered with minutely bristled punctures and the anterior margin and lateral margins are bristled.
