= Neoserica rufula =

Scientific classification
- Kingdom: Animalia
- Phylum: Arthropoda
- Clade: Pancrustacea
- Class: Insecta
- Order: Coleoptera
- Suborder: Polyphaga
- Infraorder: Scarabaeiformia
- Family: Scarabaeidae
- Genus: Neoserica
- Species: N. rufula

Binomial name
- Neoserica rufula Moser, 1915

Species of beetle

Neoserica rufula is a species of beetle of the family Scarabaeidae. It is found in Indonesia (Sumatra).

== Description ==
Adults reach a length of about 9 mm. They are similar to Neoserica castanescens. The frons is widely and very irregularly punctate, and there are a few setae next to the eyes. The antennae are yellow. The pronotum is moderately densely punctate and the lateral margins are setate. The elytra show regular rows of punctures, with the spaces between them barely noticeably convex and widely punctured. The punctures are a little stronger than in N. castanescens.
