= Neoserica castanescens =

Scientific classification
- Kingdom: Animalia
- Phylum: Arthropoda
- Clade: Pancrustacea
- Class: Insecta
- Order: Coleoptera
- Suborder: Polyphaga
- Infraorder: Scarabaeiformia
- Family: Scarabaeidae
- Genus: Neoserica
- Species: N. castanescens

Binomial name
- Neoserica castanescens Moser, 1915

Species of beetle

Neoserica castanescens is a species of beetle of the family Scarabaeidae. It is found in Indonesia (Sumatra).

== Description ==
Adults reach a length of about 9 mm. They are reddish-brown and shiny, although the sides of the thorax and abdomen are dull. The frons is widely punctured, with a few setae beside the eyes. The antennae are yellowish-brown. On the pronotum, the punctures are sparsely spaced and the lateral margins have setae. The elytra have regular rows of punctures and the very weakly convex intervals are extensively punctured and have a narrow, unpunctured median stripe towards the sides of the elytra.
