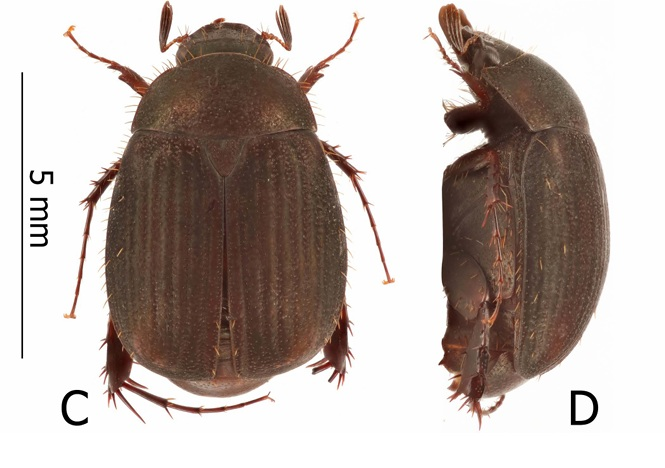

Scientific classification
- Kingdom: Animalia
- Phylum: Arthropoda
- Class: Insecta
- Order: Coleoptera
- Suborder: Polyphaga
- Infraorder: Scarabaeiformia
- Family: Scarabaeidae
- Genus: Neoserica
- Species: N. danganensis

Binomial name
- Neoserica danganensis Zhao, Huang, Huang & Ahrens, 2025

= Neoserica danganensis =

Species of beetle

Neoserica danganensis is a species of beetle of the family Scarabaeidae. It is found in China (Guangdong).

== Description ==
Adults reach a length of about 6.4 mm. The body is short, oval and entirely dark brown. The dorsal surface, except for the anterior labroclypeus, is dull, while the pronotum and elytra are glabrous.

== Etymology ==
The species name refers to Dan'gan Island, the type locality.
