= Neoserica peninsularis =

Scientific classification
- Kingdom: Animalia
- Phylum: Arthropoda
- Clade: Pancrustacea
- Class: Insecta
- Order: Coleoptera
- Suborder: Polyphaga
- Infraorder: Scarabaeiformia
- Family: Scarabaeidae
- Genus: Neoserica
- Species: N. peninsularis

Binomial name
- Neoserica peninsularis Moser, 1915

Species of beetle

Neoserica peninsularis is a species of beetle of the family Scarabaeidae. It is found in Singapore.

== Description ==
Adults reach a length of about 10 mm. The colouration and shape are similar to those of Neoserica heringi. The frons has fine, widely spaced punctures and, in the posterior part, some long setae. The antennae are yellow. The moderately densely punctured pronotum has slightly rounded and bristle-bearing lateral margins. The anterior margin is slightly projecting in the middle and has some setae laterally. The punctures on the upper surface have minute setae. The elytra are striated, the punctures with very small setae, but some punctures also have more distinct setae.
