= Neoserica heringi =

Scientific classification
- Kingdom: Animalia
- Phylum: Arthropoda
- Class: Insecta
- Order: Coleoptera
- Suborder: Polyphaga
- Infraorder: Scarabaeiformia
- Family: Scarabaeidae
- Genus: Neoserica
- Species: N. heringi

Binomial name
- Neoserica heringi Brenske, 1899

Species of beetle

Neoserica heringi is a species of beetle of the family Scarabaeidae. It is found in Indonesia (Java).

== Description ==
Adults reach a length of about 9 mm. They have an oblong-oval, dull, dark brown body. The tibiae and feet are shiny and they are silky-shimmering below and weakly opalescent above. The pronotum is short, distinctly projecting at the anterior margin, the posterior angles broadly rounded. The elytra are irregularly punctate in the striae.
