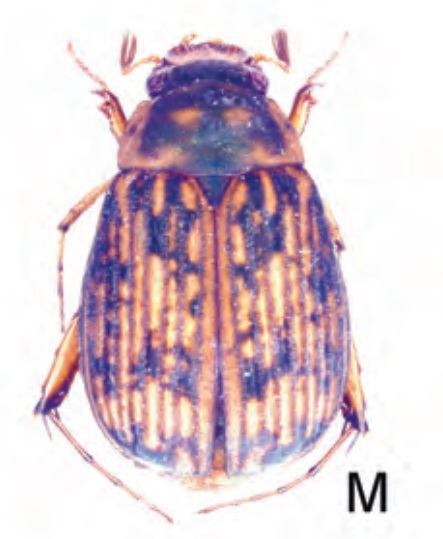

Scientific classification
- Kingdom: Animalia
- Phylum: Arthropoda
- Class: Insecta
- Order: Coleoptera
- Suborder: Polyphaga
- Infraorder: Scarabaeiformia
- Family: Scarabaeidae
- Genus: Neoserica
- Species: N. rotundotibialis

Binomial name
- Neoserica rotundotibialis Ahrens & Fabrizi, 2016

= Neoserica rotundotibialis =

Species of beetle

Neoserica rotundotibialis is a species of beetle of the family Scarabaeidae. It is found in India (Kerala).

== Description ==
Adults reach a length of about 5.2–5.8 mm. They have a dark brown, oval body, with the ventral surface, legs, sides, two lateral spots on the pronotum, and parts of the elytra are yellowish brown. The elytra have various small dark spots with a greenish shine. The dorsal surface is dull and glabrous.

== Etymology ==
The species name is derived from Latin rotundus (meaning round) and tibialis (meaning tibia) and refers to the longitudinally strongly convex dorsal margin of the metatibia.
