= Neoserica lamuensis =

Scientific classification
- Kingdom: Animalia
- Phylum: Arthropoda
- Class: Insecta
- Order: Coleoptera
- Suborder: Polyphaga
- Infraorder: Scarabaeiformia
- Family: Scarabaeidae
- Genus: Neoserica
- Species: N. lamuensis

Binomial name
- Neoserica lamuensis Brenske, 1902

Species of beetle

Neoserica lamuensis is a species of beetle of the family Scarabaeidae. It is found in Kenya.

== Description ==
Adults reach a length of about 7 mm. They are reddish yellowish-brown, dull and opalescent. They are very similar to Neoserica panganiensis, but somewhat shorter and oval, and the frons is without setae. The pronotum is almost straight laterally. The elytra are very finely punctate in the striae, the intervals are flat, narrow, and very sparsely punctate.
