= Neoserica panganiensis =

Scientific classification
- Kingdom: Animalia
- Phylum: Arthropoda
- Class: Insecta
- Order: Coleoptera
- Suborder: Polyphaga
- Infraorder: Scarabaeiformia
- Family: Scarabaeidae
- Genus: Neoserica
- Species: N. panganiensis

Binomial name
- Neoserica panganiensis Brenske, 1902

Species of beetle

Neoserica panganiensis is a species of beetle of the family Scarabaeidae. It is found in Tanzania.

== Description ==
Adults reach a length of about 7 mm. They have an oblong-oval, reddish-yellow, dull, silky-glossy body. The frons lacks distinct longitudinal lines. The pronotum is parallel laterally, almost straight, with no or very indistinct setae anteriorly, and rounded at the posterior angles. The scutellum and base of the elytra have minute white hairs. The elytra are distinctly punctate in rows, the intervals almost equally wide, not raised, dull, and sparsely punctate. The white setae are only very weakly present.
