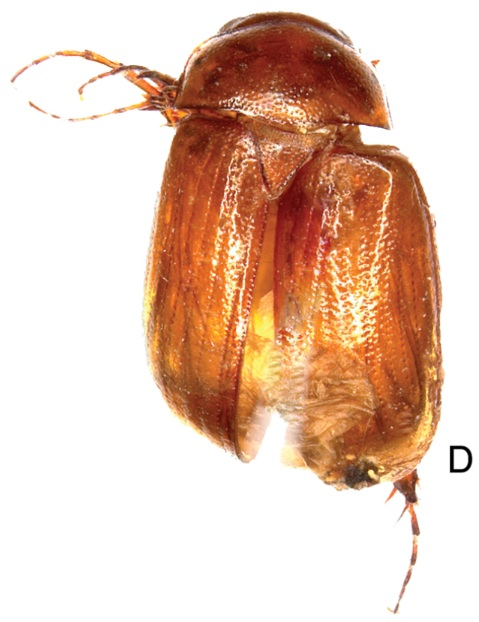

Scientific classification
- Kingdom: Animalia
- Phylum: Arthropoda
- Class: Insecta
- Order: Coleoptera
- Suborder: Polyphaga
- Infraorder: Scarabaeiformia
- Family: Scarabaeidae
- Genus: Neoserica
- Species: N. menglunensis

Binomial name
- Neoserica menglunensis Ahrens, Fabrizi & Liu, 2016

= Neoserica menglunensis =

Species of beetle

Neoserica menglunensis is a species of beetle of the family Scarabaeidae. It is found in China (Guangxi, Yunnan).

== Description ==
Adults reach a length of about 5.4–5.5 mm. They have a yellowish brown, oval body. The dorsal surface is strongly shiny and glabrous.

== Etymology ==
The species is named after the type locality, Menglun.
