= Neoserica pseudosangangana =

Scientific classification
- Kingdom: Animalia
- Phylum: Arthropoda
- Class: Insecta
- Order: Coleoptera
- Suborder: Polyphaga
- Infraorder: Scarabaeiformia
- Family: Scarabaeidae
- Genus: Neoserica
- Species: N. pseudosangangana

Binomial name
- Neoserica pseudosangangana Liu & Ahrens, 2015

Species of beetle

Neoserica pseudosangangana is a species of beetle of the family Scarabaeidae. It is found in China (Guizhou).

== Description ==
Adults reach a length of about 7–8.1 mm. They have an oval body. The dorsal surface is reddish brown, while the frons, anterior pronotum, ventral surface and legs are dark brown with a greenish shine. The sutural and lateral elytral intervals are black. The dorsal surface has dense, fine, yellowish setae.

== Etymology ==
The species name refers to its resemblance to Neoserica sangangana in external morphology.
