= Neoserica sangangana =

Scientific classification
- Kingdom: Animalia
- Phylum: Arthropoda
- Class: Insecta
- Order: Coleoptera
- Suborder: Polyphaga
- Infraorder: Scarabaeiformia
- Family: Scarabaeidae
- Genus: Neoserica
- Species: N. sangangana

Binomial name
- Neoserica sangangana Ahrens, 2003

Species of beetle

Neoserica sangangana is a species of beetle of the family Scarabaeidae. It is found in China (Fujian, Guangdong, Jiangxi).

== Description ==
Adults reach a length of about 5.9–8.3 mm. They have a reddish-brown, short-oval body. Part of the upper surface has a greenish shimmer. They are mostly dull with dense light hairs, interspersed with dense, long, strong, dark hairs. The underside is densely haired.

== Etymology ==
The species is named after the type locality, Sangang.
