= Neoserica opacula =

Scientific classification
- Kingdom: Animalia
- Phylum: Arthropoda
- Clade: Pancrustacea
- Class: Insecta
- Order: Coleoptera
- Suborder: Polyphaga
- Infraorder: Scarabaeiformia
- Family: Scarabaeidae
- Genus: Neoserica
- Species: N. opacula

Binomial name
- Neoserica opacula (Moser, 1924)

Synonyms
- Autoserica opacula Moser, 1924

Species of beetle

Neoserica opacula is a species of beetle of the family Scarabaeidae. It is found in Cameroon.

== Description ==
Adults reach a length of about 8 mm (0.31 in). They are similar to Neoserica zanzibarica, but the upper surface is slightly darker coloured, the clypeus is less punctate, the frons is bristled and the hind tibiae are not quite as broad and a little longer.
