= Neoserica zanzibarica =

Scientific classification
- Kingdom: Animalia
- Phylum: Arthropoda
- Class: Insecta
- Order: Coleoptera
- Suborder: Polyphaga
- Infraorder: Scarabaeiformia
- Family: Scarabaeidae
- Genus: Neoserica
- Species: N. zanzibarica

Binomial name
- Neoserica zanzibarica Brenske, 1902

Species of beetle

Neoserica zanzibarica is a species of beetle of the family Scarabaeidae. It is found in Tanzania.

== Description ==
Adults reach a length of about 8-8.5 mm. They are brown and dull, without a striking opalescent sheen and the elytra with scattered setae. The frons is finely punctate. The pronotum is almost straight laterally, becoming uniformly wider posteriorly, with slightly rounded posterior angles, densely and finely punctate. The scutellum is large and pointed. The elytra are punctate in rows, the intervals are of equal width, flat, widely punctate, with scattered short, appressed, pale setae.
