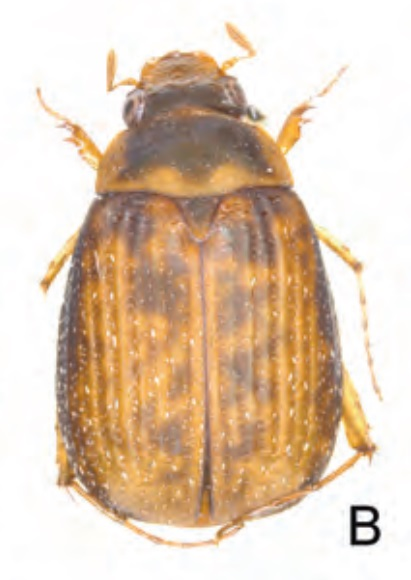

Scientific classification
- Kingdom: Animalia
- Phylum: Arthropoda
- Class: Insecta
- Order: Coleoptera
- Suborder: Polyphaga
- Infraorder: Scarabaeiformia
- Family: Scarabaeidae
- Genus: Neoserica
- Species: N. sparsesquamata

Binomial name
- Neoserica sparsesquamata Ahrens & Fabrizi, 2016

= Neoserica sparsesquamata =

Species of beetle

Neoserica sparsesquamata is a species of beetle of the family Scarabaeidae. It is found in India (Assam).

== Description ==
Adults reach a length of about 6.2 mm. They have a yellowish brown, oval body. The abdomen, disc of the pronotum, scutellum, lateral margins and dots on the elytra are all dark. The dorsal surface (except for the head) is dull and nearly glabrous, except for scale-like setae on the elytra.

== Etymology ==
The species name is derived from Latin sparsus (meaning sparse) and squamatus (meaning bearing scales) and refers to the presence of sparse scales on the elytra.
