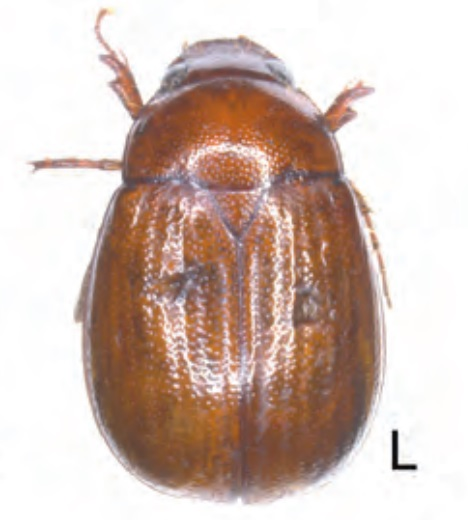

Scientific classification
- Kingdom: Animalia
- Phylum: Arthropoda
- Class: Insecta
- Order: Coleoptera
- Suborder: Polyphaga
- Infraorder: Scarabaeiformia
- Family: Scarabaeidae
- Genus: Neoserica
- Species: N. quadrilamellata

Binomial name
- Neoserica quadrilamellata (Brenske, 1896)

Synonyms
- Serica quadrilamellata Brenske, 1896; Meriserica chilkensis Arrow, 1923

= Neoserica quadrilamellata =

Species of beetle

Neoserica quadrilamellata is a species of beetle of the family Scarabaeidae. It is found in India (Bihar, Haryana, Jharkhand, Karnataka, Madhya Pradesh, Odisha, Tamil Nadu, Barkuda Island).

== Description ==
Adults reach a length of about 6.4 mm. They have a reddish brown, oval body. The antennae are yellowish brown and the dorsal surface is nearly glabrous and shiny, except for some single setae on the head.
