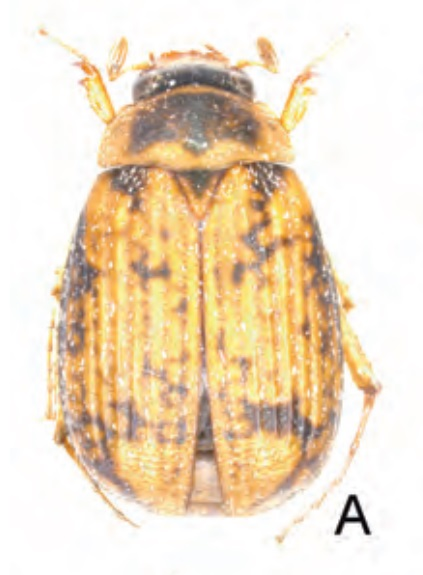

Scientific classification
- Kingdom: Animalia
- Phylum: Arthropoda
- Class: Insecta
- Order: Coleoptera
- Suborder: Polyphaga
- Infraorder: Scarabaeiformia
- Family: Scarabaeidae
- Genus: Neoserica
- Species: N. incisa

Binomial name
- Neoserica incisa Ahrens & Fabrizi, 2016

= Neoserica incisa =

Species of beetle

Neoserica incisa is a species of beetle of the family Scarabaeidae. It is found in India (Meghalaya).

== Description ==
Adults reach a length of about 5.1–6.1 mm. They have a yellowish brown, oval body. The abdomen, frons, disc of the pronotum, scutellum, lateral margin and dots on the elytra are all dark. The dorsal surface (except for the head) is dull and nearly glabrous, except for some scale-like setae on the elytra.

== Etymology ==
The species name is derived from Latin incisus (meaning incised) and refers to the morphology of the aedeagus.
