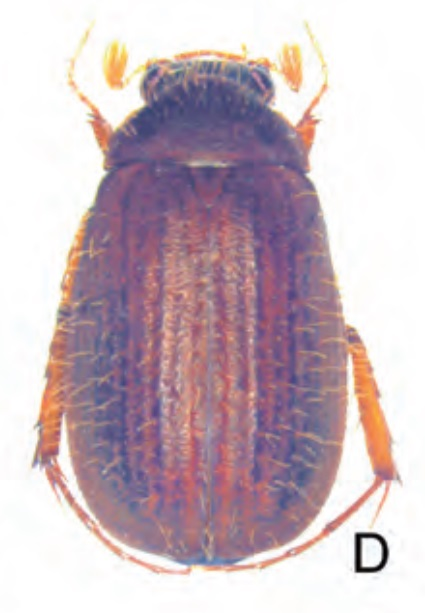

Scientific classification
- Kingdom: Animalia
- Phylum: Arthropoda
- Class: Insecta
- Order: Coleoptera
- Suborder: Polyphaga
- Infraorder: Scarabaeiformia
- Family: Scarabaeidae
- Genus: Neoserica
- Species: N. pilistriata

Binomial name
- Neoserica pilistriata Ahrens & Fabrizi, 2016

= Neoserica pilistriata =

Species of beetle

Neoserica pilistriata is a species of beetle of the family Scarabaeidae. It is found in India (Meghalaya).

== Description ==
Adults reach a length of about 9.6–10.1 mm. They have a dark brown, oblong body. The ventral surface (including antennal club) is yellowish brown and the dorsal surface is dull with dense, very long hairs.

== Etymology ==
The species name is derived from Latin pilus (meaning hair) and striatus (meaning striped) and refers to the longitudinal rows of long setae on the elytra.
