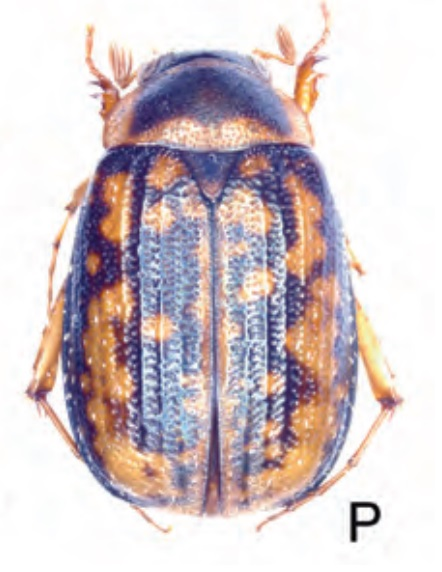

Scientific classification
- Kingdom: Animalia
- Phylum: Arthropoda
- Class: Insecta
- Order: Coleoptera
- Suborder: Polyphaga
- Infraorder: Scarabaeiformia
- Family: Scarabaeidae
- Genus: Neoserica
- Species: N. fusiforceps

Binomial name
- Neoserica fusiforceps Ahrens & Fabrizi, 2016

= Neoserica fusiforceps =

Species of beetle

Neoserica fusiforceps is a species of beetle of the family Scarabaeidae. It is found in India (Assam).

== Description ==
Adults reach a length of about 5.8 mm. They have a yellowish brown, oval body. The ventral surface, disc of the pronotum, scutellum, and dots on the elytra are all dark. The dorsal surface is moderately shiny and glabrous.

== Etymology ==
The species name is derived from Latin fusus (meaning fused) and forceps and refers to the parameres being fused with the aedeagus.
