= Neoserica australis =

Scientific classification
- Kingdom: Animalia
- Phylum: Arthropoda
- Class: Insecta
- Order: Coleoptera
- Suborder: Polyphaga
- Infraorder: Scarabaeiformia
- Family: Scarabaeidae
- Genus: Neoserica
- Species: N. australis

Binomial name
- Neoserica australis (Péringuey, 1904)

Synonyms
- Autoserica australis Péringuey, 1904

Species of beetle

Neoserica australis is a species of beetle of the family Scarabaeidae. It is found in South Africa (Eastern Cape, Mpumalanga).

== Description ==
Adults reach a length of about 7.5–8.5 mm. Adults are nearly identical to Neoserica proteana in shape, sculpture, and colouring, but the anterior margin of the clypeus is not aculeate and the genital armature of the male is much simpler than in N. proteana.
