= Neoserica proteana =

Scientific classification
- Kingdom: Animalia
- Phylum: Arthropoda
- Class: Insecta
- Order: Coleoptera
- Suborder: Polyphaga
- Infraorder: Scarabaeiformia
- Family: Scarabaeidae
- Genus: Neoserica
- Species: N. proteana

Binomial name
- Neoserica proteana (Péringuey, 1904)

Synonyms
- Autoserica proteana Péringuey, 1904

Species of beetle

Neoserica proteana is a species of beetle of the family Scarabaeidae. It is found in South Africa (KwaZulu-Natal, North West) and Zimbabwe.

== Description ==
Adults reach a length of about 8-9.5 mm. They are reddish-brown, faintly opaline on the upper side, more so on the under side, and with the head and prothorax slightly darker, or gradually turning to dark chestnut on the upper part. The antennae are reddish in females, while it is flavescent in males.
