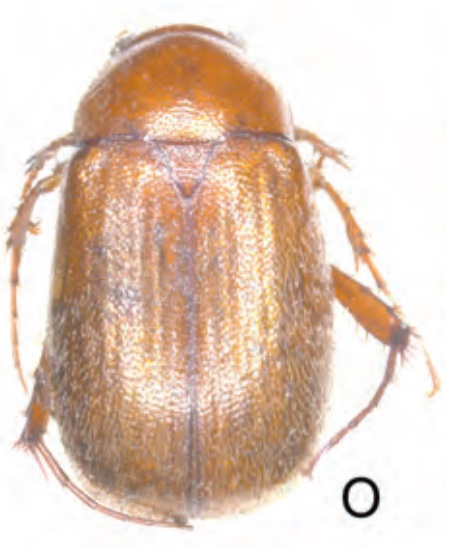

Scientific classification
- Kingdom: Animalia
- Phylum: Arthropoda
- Class: Insecta
- Order: Coleoptera
- Suborder: Polyphaga
- Infraorder: Scarabaeiformia
- Family: Scarabaeidae
- Genus: Neoserica
- Species: N. pubescens

Binomial name
- Neoserica pubescens (Burmeister, 1855)

Synonyms
- Astaena pubescens Burmeister, 1855; Ancylonycha pubescens; Neoserica subsetosa Ahrens & Fabrizi, 2016

= Neoserica pubescens =

Species of beetle

Neoserica pubescens is a species of beetle of the family Scarabaeidae. It is found in India (Maharashtra).

== Description ==
Adults reach a length of about 5.8–7.8 mm. They have a yellowish brown, elongate body. The dorsal surface has very dense hairs and is shiny, as well as finely and densely punctate.
