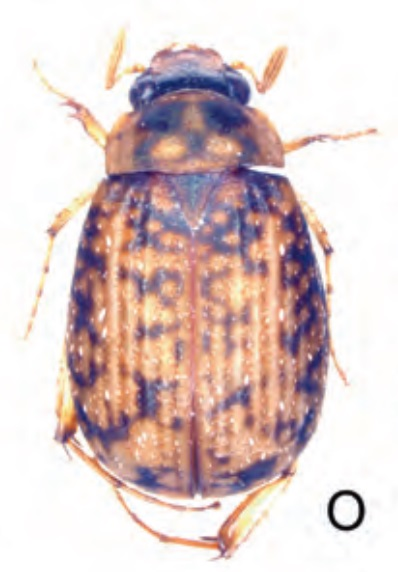

Scientific classification
- Kingdom: Animalia
- Phylum: Arthropoda
- Class: Insecta
- Order: Coleoptera
- Suborder: Polyphaga
- Infraorder: Scarabaeiformia
- Family: Scarabaeidae
- Genus: Neoserica
- Species: N. flagrans

Binomial name
- Neoserica flagrans Ahrens & Fabrizi, 2016

= Neoserica flagrans =

Species of beetle

Neoserica flagrans is a species of beetle of the family Scarabaeidae. It is found in Myanmar.

== Description ==
Adults reach a length of about 5.5 mm. They have a yellowish brown, oval body. The ventral surface, two pairs of large spots on the disc of the pronotum, scutellum and dots on the elytra are all dark. The dorsal surface (except for the head) is dull and nearly glabrous, except for some scale-like setae on the elytra.

== Etymology ==
The species name is derived from Latin flagrans (meaning burning).
