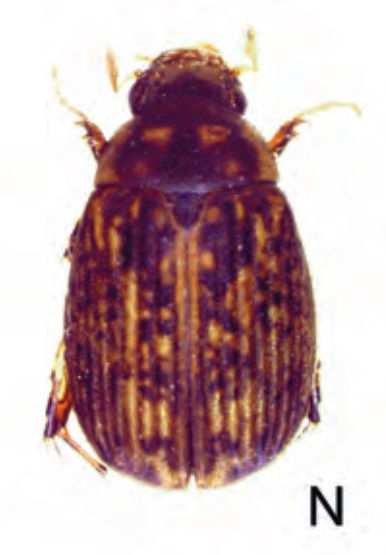

Scientific classification
- Kingdom: Animalia
- Phylum: Arthropoda
- Class: Insecta
- Order: Coleoptera
- Suborder: Polyphaga
- Infraorder: Scarabaeiformia
- Family: Scarabaeidae
- Genus: Neoserica
- Species: N. submaculosa

Binomial name
- Neoserica submaculosa Ahrens & Fabrizi, 2016

= Neoserica submaculosa =

Species of beetle

Neoserica submaculosa is a species of beetle of the family Scarabaeidae. It is found in Kerala, India.

== Description ==
Adults reach a length of about 5.8–6.2 mm. They have a dark brown, oval body, with the ventral surface slightly lighter and the sides, two lateral spots on the pronotum, and parts of the elytra yellowish brown. The elytra have various small dark spots with a greenish shine. The dorsal surface is dull and glabrous.

== Etymology ==
The species name is derived from Latin sub (meaning almost) and maculosa (meaning with spots) and refers to the dorsal surface covered with dark spots.
