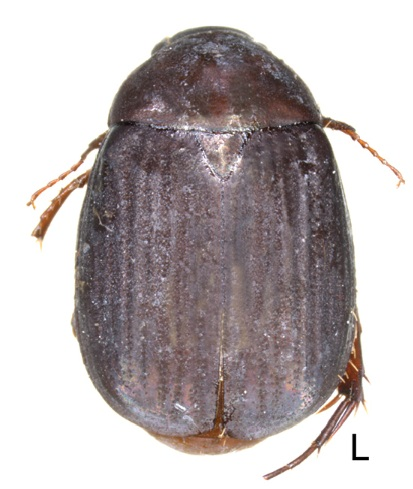

Scientific classification
- Kingdom: Animalia
- Phylum: Arthropoda
- Clade: Pancrustacea
- Class: Insecta
- Order: Coleoptera
- Suborder: Polyphaga
- Infraorder: Scarabaeiformia
- Family: Scarabaeidae
- Genus: Neoserica
- Species: N. sakoliana

Binomial name
- Neoserica sakoliana Ahrens, Fabrizi & Liu, 2016

= Neoserica sakoliana =

Species of beetle

Neoserica sakoliana is a species of beetle of the family Scarabaeidae. It is found in China (Guangdong, Guangxi, Hainan).

== Description ==
Adults reach a length of about 6.4–8.1 mm. They have a dark brown, short-oval body. The ventral surface is reddish brown and the entire surface (except for the anterior labroclypeus) is dull, the head with some greenish shine. The pronotum and elytra are glabrous.

== Etymology ==
The name of the new species is derived from the type locality, Sa ko lia.
