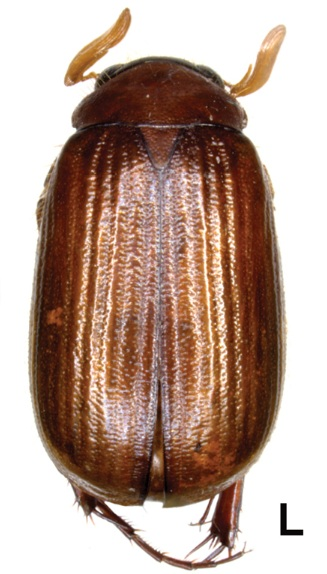

Scientific classification
- Kingdom: Animalia
- Phylum: Arthropoda
- Clade: Pancrustacea
- Class: Insecta
- Order: Coleoptera
- Suborder: Polyphaga
- Infraorder: Scarabaeiformia
- Family: Scarabaeidae
- Genus: Neoserica
- Species: N. plurilamellata

Binomial name
- Neoserica plurilamellata Ahrens, Fabrizi & Liu, 2014

= Neoserica plurilamellata =

Species of beetle

Neoserica plurilamellata is a species of beetle of the family Scarabaeidae. It is found in China (Yunnan).

== Description ==
Adults reach a length of about 8.3–8.6 mm. They have a reddish brown, oblong body. The antennal club is yellowish brown and the dorsal surface is moderately shiny and nearly glabrous, except for a few long setae on the head.

== Etymology ==
The species is named with the composed adjective, pluri– (prefix from Latin plus, pluris meaning more) and lamellata (from Latin lamellatus meaning lamellate).
