= Neoserica inclinata =

Scientific classification
- Kingdom: Animalia
- Phylum: Arthropoda
- Class: Insecta
- Order: Coleoptera
- Suborder: Polyphaga
- Infraorder: Scarabaeiformia
- Family: Scarabaeidae
- Genus: Neoserica
- Species: N. inclinata

Binomial name
- Neoserica inclinata Brenske, 1898

Species of beetle

Neoserica inclinata is a species of beetle of the family Scarabaeidae. It is found in Cambodia and Vietnam.

== Description ==
Adults reach a length of about 12.5 mm. They are brown, dull and somewhat reddish underneath. The head is short and the eyes are large. The clypeus is distinctly shorter than wide, straight at the sides, the suture not curved, scarcely curved anteriorly, with more widely spaced, coarser setae behind the weakly raised anterior margin, and a slight convexity in the middle, followed by finer, denser punctation. The pronotum is distinctly projecting forward in the middle anteriorly, the sides are straight, becoming distinctly wider posteriorly, with slightly rounded, strikingly sharply defined hind angles. The elytra are coarsely and intricately punctate with minute hairs. The interstices are slightly raised and unpunctate. The pygidium is distinctly tapered with curved sides before the tip.

== Taxonomy ==
The specimen preserved in the Zoologisches Museum der Humboldt-Universität (ZHMB) is a female and not a male as stated by Brenske when he described the species in 1898. Furthermore, its genitalia are strongly damaged, and therefore an assignment to Neoserica abnormis or any of the other recognised species in the Neoserica abnormis species group is not possible. This species very likely belongs to the Neoserica abnormis group as well.
