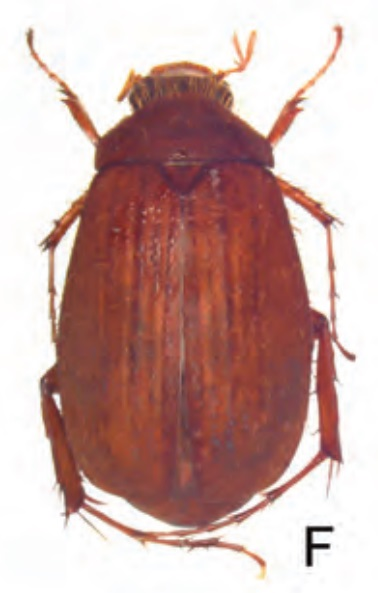

Scientific classification
- Kingdom: Animalia
- Phylum: Arthropoda
- Class: Insecta
- Order: Coleoptera
- Suborder: Polyphaga
- Infraorder: Scarabaeiformia
- Family: Scarabaeidae
- Genus: Neoserica
- Species: N. ziyardamensis

Binomial name
- Neoserica ziyardamensis Ahrens & Fabrizi, 2016

= Neoserica ziyardamensis =

Species of beetle

Neoserica ziyardamensis is a species of beetle of the family Scarabaeidae. It is found in northern Myanmar.

== Description ==
Adults reach a length of about 11.4 mm. They have a dark reddish brown, oblong body. The antennal club is yellowish brown and the dorsal surface is dull, with moderately dense to sparse long hairs.

== Etymology ==
The species is named after its type locality, the village of Zi Yar Dam.
