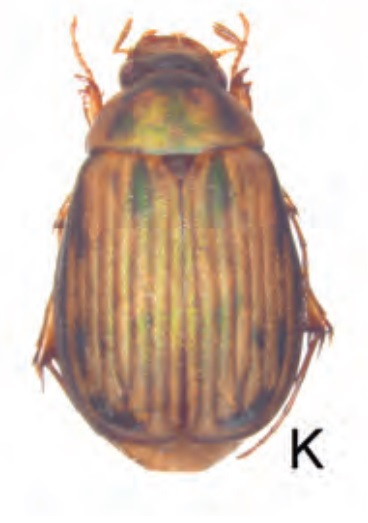

Scientific classification
- Kingdom: Animalia
- Phylum: Arthropoda
- Class: Insecta
- Order: Coleoptera
- Suborder: Polyphaga
- Infraorder: Scarabaeiformia
- Family: Scarabaeidae
- Genus: Neoserica
- Species: N. plateosa

Binomial name
- Neoserica plateosa Ahrens & Fabrizi, 2016

= Neoserica plateosa =

Species of beetle

Neoserica plateosa is a species of beetle of the family Scarabaeidae. It is found in India (Karnataka).

== Description ==
Adults reach a length of about 6.2–7.2 mm. They have a yellowish brown, oval body. The anterior disc, two lateral long spots on the pronotum and various small spots on the elytra are dark and with a greenish shine. The dorsal surface is dull and glabrous.

== Etymology ==
The species name is derived from Latin plateosus (meaning rich with spots) and refers to the dark ornamentation of the dorsal surface.
