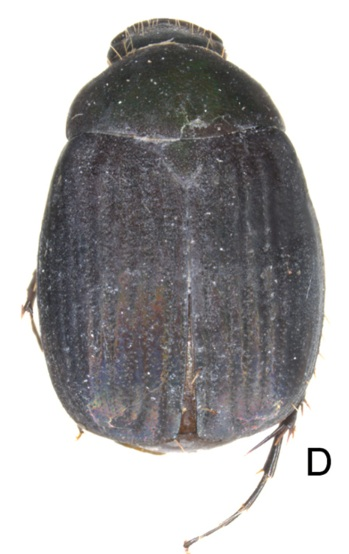

Scientific classification
- Kingdom: Animalia
- Phylum: Arthropoda
- Class: Insecta
- Order: Coleoptera
- Suborder: Polyphaga
- Infraorder: Scarabaeiformia
- Family: Scarabaeidae
- Genus: Neoserica
- Species: N. tahianensis

Binomial name
- Neoserica tahianensis Ahrens, Fabrizi & Liu, 2016

= Neoserica tahianensis =

Species of beetle

Neoserica tahianensis is a species of beetle of the family Scarabaeidae. It is found in China (Guangdong, Hainan).

== Description ==
Adults reach a length of about 6.5–7.1 mm. They have a dark brown, short-oval body. The elytra are black and the abdomen is dark brown. The dorsal surface (except for the anterior labroclypeus) is dull, the head and pronotum with some greenish shine. Both the pronotum and elytra are glabrous.

== Etymology ==
The name of the species is derived from the type locality, Ta Hian.
