= Neoserica (Autoserica) bicolor =

Scientific classification
- Kingdom: Animalia
- Phylum: Arthropoda
- Class: Insecta
- Order: Coleoptera
- Suborder: Polyphaga
- Infraorder: Scarabaeiformia
- Family: Scarabaeidae
- Genus: Neoserica
- Species: N. bicolor

Binomial name
- Neoserica bicolor (Frey, 1960)

Synonyms
- Autoserica bicolor Frey, 1960

Species of beetle

Neoserica bicolor is a species of beetle of the family Scarabaeidae. It is found in Angola.

== Description ==
Adults reach a length of about 6 mm. The head, anterior half of the pronotum, scutellum and a distinctly contrasting, highly variable spot on the lateral margin of the elytra, as well as the underside, pygidium and legs are black. The remaining upper surface and the antennae are reddish-brown.

== Taxonomy ==
The species name is preoccupied by Neoserica bicolor, described by Burgeon in 1942.
