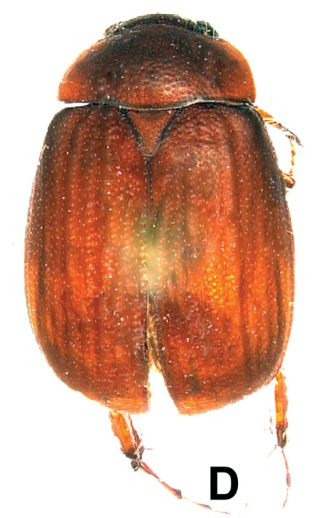

Scientific classification
- Kingdom: Animalia
- Phylum: Arthropoda
- Class: Insecta
- Order: Coleoptera
- Suborder: Polyphaga
- Infraorder: Scarabaeiformia
- Family: Scarabaeidae
- Genus: Neoserica
- Species: N. menghaiensis

Binomial name
- Neoserica menghaiensis Liu, Fabrizi, Bai, Yang & Ahrens, 2014

Synonyms
- Neoserica napoana Liu, Fabrizi, Bai, Yang & Ahrens, 2014

= Neoserica menghaiensis =

Species of beetle

Neoserica menghaiensis is a species of beetle of the family Scarabaeidae. It is found in China (Guangxi, Yunnan).

== Description ==
Adults reach a length of about 5.1–5.7 mm. They have a dark reddish brown, oval body. The antennal club is yellowish brown and the dorsal surface is dull and nearly glabrous, while the labroclypeus and anterior half of the frons are shiny.

== Etymology ==
The species is named after its type locality, Menghai.
