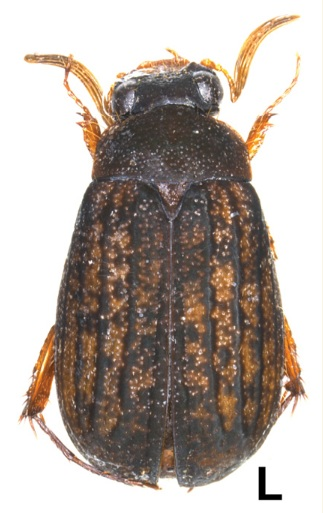

Scientific classification
- Kingdom: Animalia
- Phylum: Arthropoda
- Class: Insecta
- Order: Coleoptera
- Suborder: Polyphaga
- Infraorder: Scarabaeiformia
- Family: Scarabaeidae
- Genus: Neoserica
- Species: N. zheijangensis

Binomial name
- Neoserica zheijangensis Liu, Fabrizi, Bai, Yang & Ahrens, 2014

= Neoserica zheijangensis =

Species of beetle

Neoserica zheijangensis is a species of beetle of the family Scarabaeidae. It is found in China (Fujian, Hubei, Yunnan, Zhejiang).

== Description ==
Adults reach a length of about 5.1–5.9 mm. They have a dark reddish brown, oblong body. The labroclypeus and irregular spots on the elytra are reddish brown, the antennal club is yellowish brown and the dorsal surface is dull and nearly glabrous, with only the labroclypeus and anterior half of the frons shiny.

== Etymology ==
The species is named after its occurrence in Zheijang Province.
