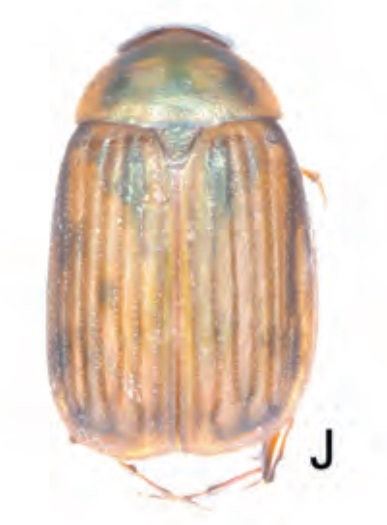

Scientific classification
- Kingdom: Animalia
- Phylum: Arthropoda
- Class: Insecta
- Order: Coleoptera
- Suborder: Polyphaga
- Infraorder: Scarabaeiformia
- Family: Scarabaeidae
- Genus: Neoserica
- Species: N. genieri

Binomial name
- Neoserica genieri Ahrens & Fabrizi, 2016

= Neoserica genieri =

Species of beetle

Neoserica genieri is a species of beetle of the family Scarabaeidae. It is found in India (Karnataka).

== Description ==
Adults reach a length of about 6.1–6.9 mm. They have a yellowish brown, oval body, with the ventral surface slightly darker. The disc of the pronotum, scutellum and various small spots on the elytra are dark with a greenish shine. The dorsal surface is dull and glabrous.

== Etymology ==
The species is named after François Génier who sent the authors the material of the Canadian Museum of Nature for study.
