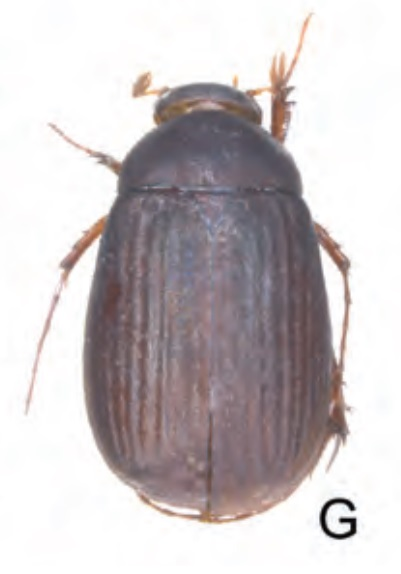

Scientific classification
- Kingdom: Animalia
- Phylum: Arthropoda
- Clade: Pancrustacea
- Class: Insecta
- Order: Coleoptera
- Suborder: Polyphaga
- Infraorder: Scarabaeiformia
- Family: Scarabaeidae
- Genus: Neoserica
- Species: N. multiflabellata

Binomial name
- Neoserica multiflabellata Moser, 1916

= Neoserica multiflabellata =

Species of beetle

Neoserica multiflabellata is a species of beetle of the family Scarabaeidae. It is found in India (Tamil Nadu).

== Description ==
Adults reach a length of about 5.6 mm. They have a reddish brown, oval body, but the antennae are yellowish brown. The dorsal surface is dull and nearly glabrous, except for some hairs on the head.
