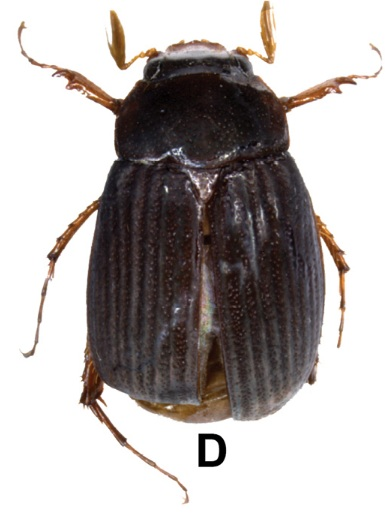

Scientific classification
- Kingdom: Animalia
- Phylum: Arthropoda
- Class: Insecta
- Order: Coleoptera
- Suborder: Polyphaga
- Infraorder: Scarabaeiformia
- Family: Scarabaeidae
- Genus: Neoserica
- Species: N. koelkebecki

Binomial name
- Neoserica koelkebecki Liu, Fabrizi, Bai, Yang & Ahrens, 2014

= Neoserica koelkebecki =

Species of beetle

Neoserica koelkebecki is a species of beetle of the family Scarabaeidae. It is found in South Korea.

== Description ==
Adults reach a length of about 5.8 mm. They have a dark reddish brown, oval body. The antennal club is yellowish brown and the dorsal surface is dull and nearly glabrous, while the labroclypeus and anterior half of the frons are shiny.

== Etymology ==
The species is named after the collector of the species, Torben Kölkebeck.
