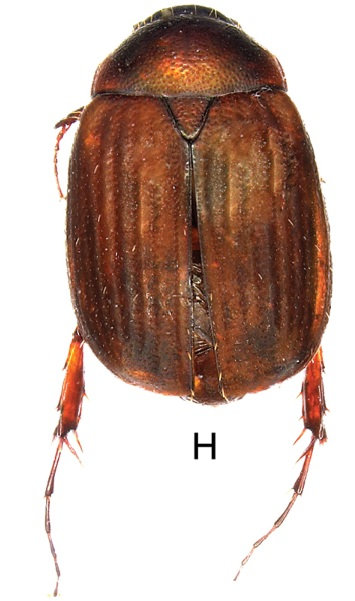

Scientific classification
- Kingdom: Animalia
- Phylum: Arthropoda
- Class: Insecta
- Order: Coleoptera
- Suborder: Polyphaga
- Infraorder: Scarabaeiformia
- Family: Scarabaeidae
- Genus: Neoserica
- Species: N. shuyongi

Binomial name
- Neoserica shuyongi Ahrens, Fabrizi & Liu, 2016

= Neoserica shuyongi =

Species of beetle

Neoserica shuyongi is a species of beetle of the family Scarabaeidae. It is found in China (Hainan).

== Description ==
Adults reach a length of about 5.9 mm. They have a dark brown, partly reddish, short-oval body. The dorsal surface (except for the anterior labroclypeus) is moderately dull and the pronotum and elytra are glabrous.

== Etymology ==
The species is named after its collector, Wang Shuyong.
