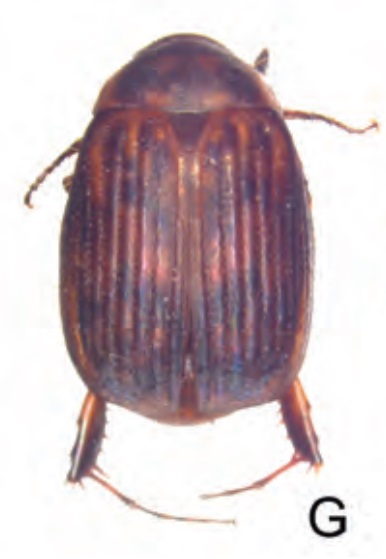

Scientific classification
- Kingdom: Animalia
- Phylum: Arthropoda
- Class: Insecta
- Order: Coleoptera
- Suborder: Polyphaga
- Infraorder: Scarabaeiformia
- Family: Scarabaeidae
- Genus: Neoserica
- Species: N. ammattiensis

Binomial name
- Neoserica ammattiensis Ahrens & Fabrizi, 2016

= Neoserica ammattiensis =

Species of beetle

Neoserica ammattiensis is a species of beetle of the family Scarabaeidae. It is found in southern India.

== Description ==
Adults reach a length of about 5.1–5.6 mm. They have a yellowish brown, oval body. The ventral surface, disc of the pronotum and various small spots on the elytra are all dark brown with a greenish shine. The dorsal surface is dull and glabrous.

== Etymology ==
The species is named after its type locality, Ammatti.
