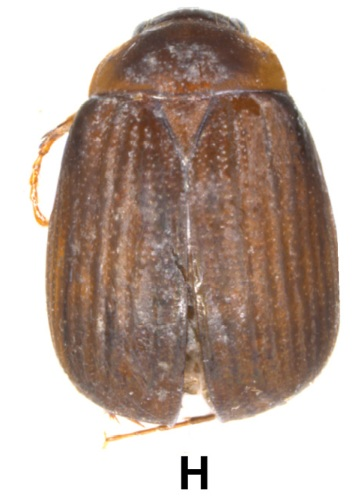

Scientific classification
- Kingdom: Animalia
- Phylum: Arthropoda
- Class: Insecta
- Order: Coleoptera
- Suborder: Polyphaga
- Infraorder: Scarabaeiformia
- Family: Scarabaeidae
- Genus: Neoserica
- Species: N. anonyma

Binomial name
- Neoserica anonyma Liu, Fabrizi, Bai, Yang & Ahrens, 2014

= Neoserica anonyma =

Species of beetle

Neoserica anonyma is a species of beetle of the family Scarabaeidae. It is found in China (Yunnan).

== Description ==
Adults reach a length of about 5.1–6.1 mm. They have a dark reddish brown, oval body. The antennal club is yellowish brown and the dorsal surface is dull and nearly glabrous, while the labroclypeus and anterior half of the frons are shiny.

== Etymology ==
The species name is derived Latin anonymus (meaning anonymous) and refers to its inconspicuous external appearance what made it hard initially to group this species systematically.
