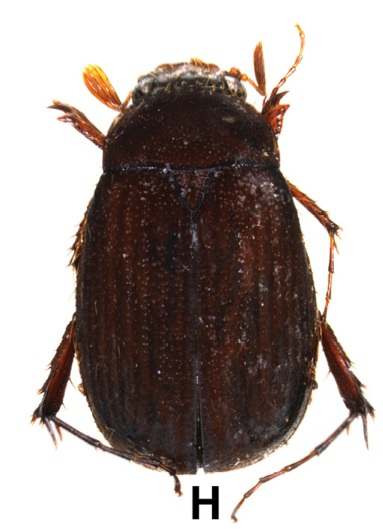

Scientific classification
- Kingdom: Animalia
- Phylum: Arthropoda
- Class: Insecta
- Order: Coleoptera
- Suborder: Polyphaga
- Infraorder: Scarabaeiformia
- Family: Scarabaeidae
- Genus: Neoserica
- Species: N. luxiensis

Binomial name
- Neoserica luxiensis Liu, Fabrizi, Bai, Yang & Ahrens, 2014

= Neoserica luxiensis =

Species of beetle

Neoserica luxiensis is a species of beetle of the family Scarabaeidae. It is found in China (Yunnan).

== Description ==
Adults reach a length of about 6.1 mm. They have a dark reddish brown, oblong-oval body. The antennal club is yellowish brown and the dorsal surface is dull and nearly glabrous, while the labroclypeus and anterior half of the frons are shiny.

== Etymology ==
The species is named after its type locality, Luxi.
