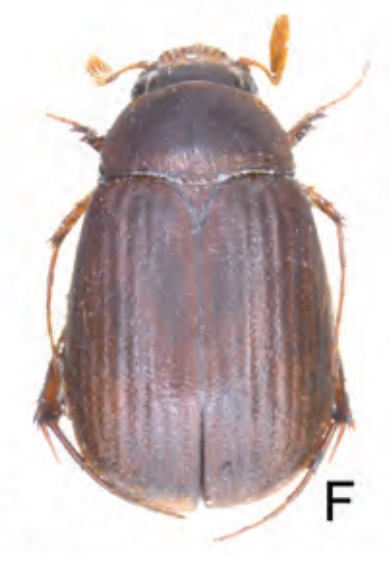

Scientific classification
- Kingdom: Animalia
- Phylum: Arthropoda
- Class: Insecta
- Order: Coleoptera
- Suborder: Polyphaga
- Infraorder: Scarabaeiformia
- Family: Scarabaeidae
- Genus: Neoserica
- Species: N. keralana

Binomial name
- Neoserica keralana Ahrens & Fabrizi, 2016

= Neoserica keralana =

Species of beetle

Neoserica keralana is a species of beetle of the family Scarabaeidae. It is found in India (Kerala).

== Description ==
Adults reach a length of about 6 mm. They have a dark brown, oval body, but the antennae are yellowish brown. The dorsal surface is dull and nearly glabrous, except for some hairs on the head.

== Etymology ==
The species is named according to its occurrence in Kerala state.
