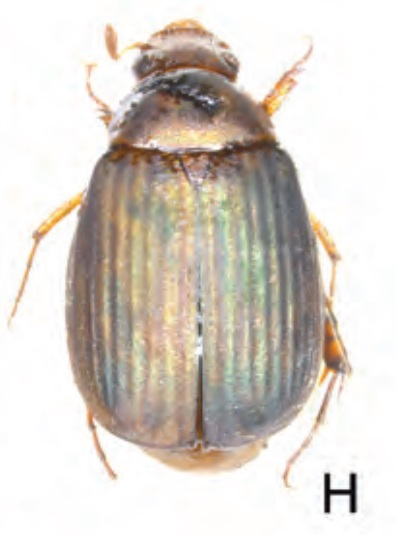

Scientific classification
- Kingdom: Animalia
- Phylum: Arthropoda
- Class: Insecta
- Order: Coleoptera
- Suborder: Polyphaga
- Infraorder: Scarabaeiformia
- Family: Scarabaeidae
- Genus: Neoserica
- Species: N. dichroa

Binomial name
- Neoserica dichroa Frey, 1973

= Neoserica dichroa =

Species of beetle

Neoserica dichroa is a species of beetle of the family Scarabaeidae. It is found in India (Kerala).

== Description ==
Adults reach a length of about 7.3 mm. They have a yellowish brown, oval body, with the ventral surface slightly darker. The disc of the pronotum and various small spots on the elytra are dark with a greenish shine. The dorsal surface is dull and glabrous.
