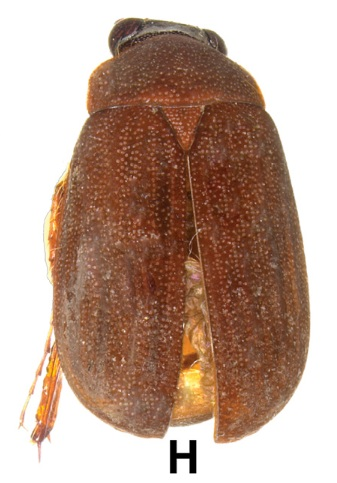

Scientific classification
- Kingdom: Animalia
- Phylum: Arthropoda
- Class: Insecta
- Order: Coleoptera
- Suborder: Polyphaga
- Infraorder: Scarabaeiformia
- Family: Scarabaeidae
- Genus: Neoserica
- Species: N. zongyuani

Binomial name
- Neoserica zongyuani Liu, Fabrizi, Bai, Yang & Ahrens, 2014

= Neoserica zongyuani =

Species of beetle

Neoserica zongyuani is a species of beetle of the family Scarabaeidae. It is found in China (Sichuan).

== Description ==
Adults reach a length of about 6 mm. They have a dark reddish brown, oblong body. The antennal club is yellowish brown and the dorsal surface is dull and nearly glabrous, while the labroclypeus and anterior two thirds of the frons are shiny.

== Etymology ==
The species is named after one of the collectors of the type series, Wang Zongyuan.
