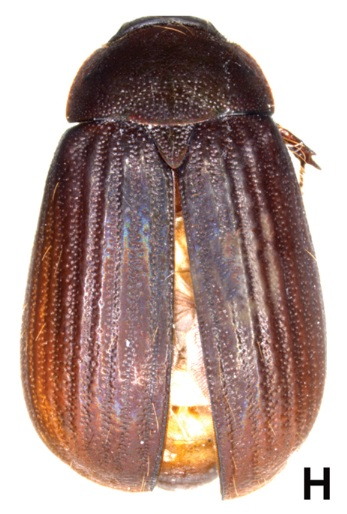

Scientific classification
- Kingdom: Animalia
- Phylum: Arthropoda
- Class: Insecta
- Order: Coleoptera
- Suborder: Polyphaga
- Infraorder: Scarabaeiformia
- Family: Scarabaeidae
- Genus: Neoserica
- Species: N. guangpingensis

Binomial name
- Neoserica guangpingensis Ahrens, Fabrizi & Liu, 2014

= Neoserica guangpingensis =

Species of beetle

Neoserica guangpingensis is a species of beetle of the family Scarabaeidae. It is found in China (Yunnan).

== Description ==
Adults reach a length of about 8.8 mm. They have a dark brown, oblong body. The antennal club is yellowish brown and the dorsal surface is dull and nearly glabrous, except for a few long setae on the head and along the sides of the elytra.

== Etymology ==
The species is named according to its type locality Guang Ping (China).
