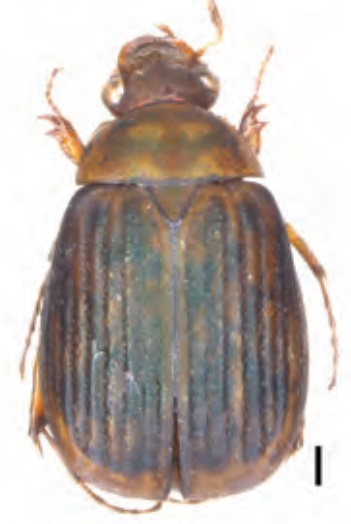

Scientific classification
- Kingdom: Animalia
- Phylum: Arthropoda
- Class: Insecta
- Order: Coleoptera
- Suborder: Polyphaga
- Infraorder: Scarabaeiformia
- Family: Scarabaeidae
- Genus: Neoserica
- Species: N. flavoviridis

Binomial name
- Neoserica flavoviridis (Brenske, 1896)

Synonyms
- Serica flavoviridis Brenske, 1896; Autoserica flavoviridis

= Neoserica flavoviridis =

Species of beetle

Neoserica flavoviridis is a species of beetle of the family Scarabaeidae. It is found in India.

== Description ==
Adults reach a length of about 6.2 mm. They have a yellowish brown, oval body, with the ventral surface, disc of the pronotum and various small spots on the elytra dark brown with a greenish shine. The dorsal surface is dull and glabrous.
