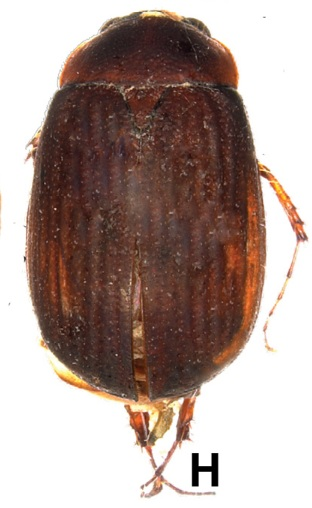

Scientific classification
- Kingdom: Animalia
- Phylum: Arthropoda
- Class: Insecta
- Order: Coleoptera
- Suborder: Polyphaga
- Infraorder: Scarabaeiformia
- Family: Scarabaeidae
- Genus: Neoserica
- Species: N. liangi

Binomial name
- Neoserica liangi Liu, Fabrizi, Bai, Yang & Ahrens, 2014

= Neoserica liangi =

Species of beetle

Neoserica liangi is a species of beetle of the family Scarabaeidae. It is found in China (Yunnan), Laos and Vietnam.

== Description ==
Adults reach a length of about 5.9 mm. They have a dark reddish brown, oval body. The antennal club is yellowish brown and the dorsal surface is dull and nearly glabrous, while the labroclypeus and anterior half of the frons are shiny.

== Etymology ==
The species is named after the collector of the holotype, Liang Geqiu.
