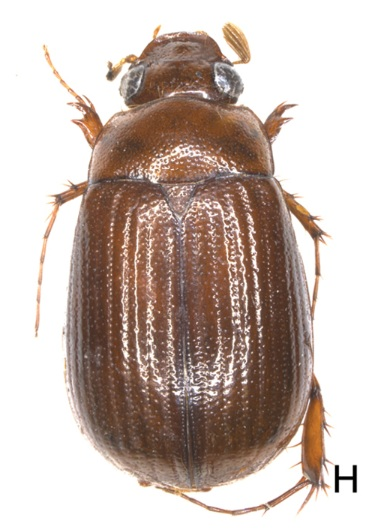

Scientific classification
- Kingdom: Animalia
- Phylum: Arthropoda
- Class: Insecta
- Order: Coleoptera
- Suborder: Polyphaga
- Infraorder: Scarabaeiformia
- Family: Scarabaeidae
- Genus: Neoserica
- Species: N. mantillerii

Binomial name
- Neoserica mantillerii Ahrens, Fabrizi & Liu, 2016

= Neoserica mantillerii =

Species of beetle

Neoserica mantillerii is a species of beetle of the family Scarabaeidae. It is found in China (Yunnan).

== Description ==
Adults reach a length of about 6.8 mm. They have a yellowish brown, oval body. The dorsal surface is strongly shiny and glabrous.

== Etymology ==
The species is named after one of its collectors, Mr. Mantilleri.
