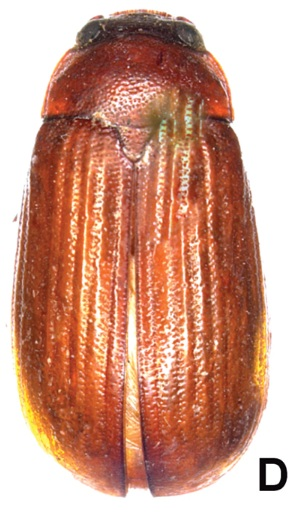

Scientific classification
- Kingdom: Animalia
- Phylum: Arthropoda
- Clade: Pancrustacea
- Class: Insecta
- Order: Coleoptera
- Suborder: Polyphaga
- Infraorder: Scarabaeiformia
- Family: Scarabaeidae
- Genus: Neoserica
- Species: N. daweishanica

Binomial name
- Neoserica daweishanica Ahrens, Fabrizi & Liu, 2014

= Neoserica daweishanica =

Species of beetle

Neoserica daweishanica is a species of beetle of the family Scarabaeidae. It is found in China (Yunnan).

== Description ==
Adults reach a length of about 8.6–9.5 mm. They have a reddish brown, oblong body. The antennal club is yellowish brown. The dorsal surface is moderately shiny and nearly glabrous, except for a few long setae on the head.

== Etymology ==
The species is named after its type locality, Daweishan mountain.
