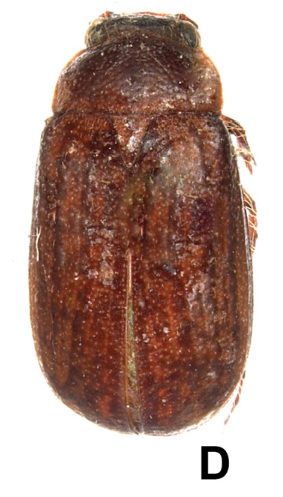

Scientific classification
- Kingdom: Animalia
- Phylum: Arthropoda
- Class: Insecta
- Order: Coleoptera
- Suborder: Polyphaga
- Infraorder: Scarabaeiformia
- Family: Scarabaeidae
- Genus: Neoserica
- Species: N. zhibenshanica

Binomial name
- Neoserica zhibenshanica Liu, Fabrizi, Bai, Yang & Ahrens, 2014

= Neoserica zhibenshanica =

Species of beetle

Neoserica zhibenshanica is a species of beetle of the family Scarabaeidae. It is found in China (Yunnan).

== Description ==
Adults reach a length of about 6.6 mm. They have a dark reddish brown, oblong body. The antennal club is yellowish brown and the dorsal surface is dull and nearly glabrous, while the labroclypeus and anterior half of the frons are shiny.

== Etymology ==
The species is named after its type locality, Zhibenshan mountain.
