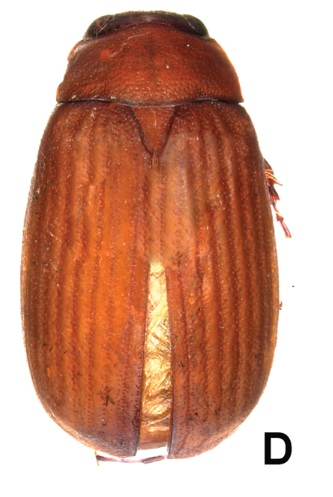

Scientific classification
- Kingdom: Animalia
- Phylum: Arthropoda
- Class: Insecta
- Order: Coleoptera
- Suborder: Polyphaga
- Infraorder: Scarabaeiformia
- Family: Scarabaeidae
- Genus: Neoserica
- Species: N. yanzigouensis

Binomial name
- Neoserica yanzigouensis Ahrens, Fabrizi & Liu, 2014

= Neoserica yanzigouensis =

Species of beetle

Neoserica yanzigouensis is a species of beetle of the family Scarabaeidae. It is found in China (Sichuan).

== Description ==
Adults reach a length of about 8.2–9.6 mm. They have a dark reddish brown, oblong body. The antennal club is yellowish brown and the dorsal surface is dull and nearly glabrous, except for a few long setae on the head.

== Etymology ==
The species is named after its type locality, Yanzigou.
