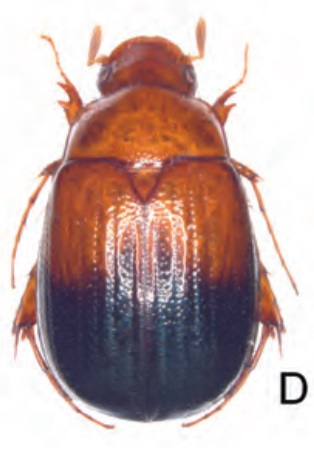

Scientific classification
- Kingdom: Animalia
- Phylum: Arthropoda
- Class: Insecta
- Order: Coleoptera
- Suborder: Polyphaga
- Infraorder: Scarabaeiformia
- Family: Scarabaeidae
- Genus: Neoserica
- Species: N. bicolorea

Binomial name
- Neoserica bicolorea Ahrens & Fabrizi, 2016

= Neoserica bicolorea =

Species of beetle

Neoserica bicolorea is a species of beetle of the family Scarabaeidae. It is found in India (Meghalaya).

== Description ==
Adults reach a length of about 6.2–6.5 mm. They have a yellowish brown, oval body. The posterior half of the elytra is black and the dorsal surface is shiny and glabrous.

== Etymology ==
The species name is derived from Latin coloreus (meaning variegated) and bi- (meaning twice) and refers to the bicoloured elytra.
