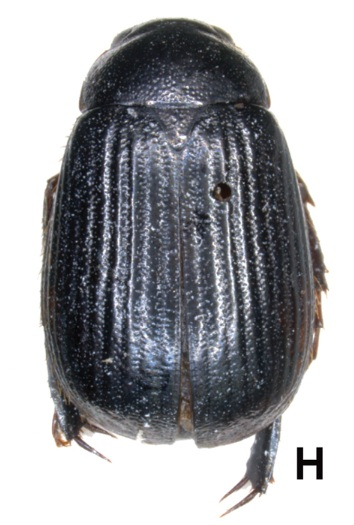

Scientific classification
- Kingdom: Animalia
- Phylum: Arthropoda
- Clade: Pancrustacea
- Class: Insecta
- Order: Coleoptera
- Suborder: Polyphaga
- Infraorder: Scarabaeiformia
- Family: Scarabaeidae
- Genus: Neoserica
- Species: N. septemfoliata

Binomial name
- Neoserica septemfoliata Moser, 1915

= Neoserica septemfoliata =

Species of beetle

Neoserica septemfoliata is a species of beetle of the family Scarabaeidae. It is found in China (Yunnan).

== Description ==
Adults reach a length of about 8.4 mm. They have a black, oblong body. The antennal club is yellowish brown and the dorsal surface is shiny and nearly glabrous, except for a few long setae on the head.
