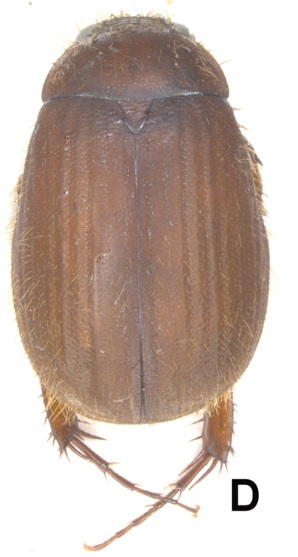

Scientific classification
- Kingdom: Animalia
- Phylum: Arthropoda
- Class: Insecta
- Order: Coleoptera
- Suborder: Polyphaga
- Infraorder: Scarabaeiformia
- Family: Scarabaeidae
- Genus: Neoserica
- Species: N. septemlamellata

Binomial name
- Neoserica septemlamellata Brenske, 1899

Synonyms
- Aserica septemlamellata

= Neoserica septemlamellata =

Species of beetle

Neoserica septemlamellata is a species of beetle of the family Scarabaeidae. It is found in Laos, Myanmar, Thailand and China (Yunnan).

== Description ==
Adults reach a length of about 8.3 mm. They have a reddish brown, oblong body. The antennal club is yellowish brown, the labroclypeus is shiny and the dorsal surface is dull, with dense and erect setae.
