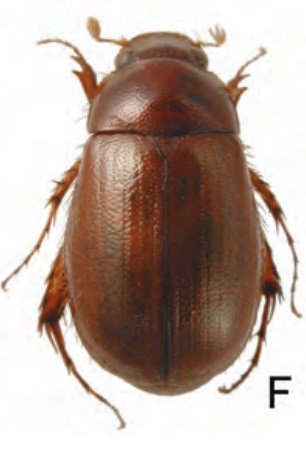

Scientific classification
- Kingdom: Animalia
- Phylum: Arthropoda
- Class: Insecta
- Order: Coleoptera
- Suborder: Polyphaga
- Infraorder: Scarabaeiformia
- Family: Scarabaeidae
- Genus: Neoserica
- Species: N. pubiforceps

Binomial name
- Neoserica pubiforceps Ahrens, 2004

= Neoserica pubiforceps =

Species of beetle

Neoserica pubiforceps is a species of beetle of the family Scarabaeidae. It is found in eastern Nepal and India (Sikkim, Assam, Meghalaya).

== Description ==
Adults reach a length of about 6–8 mm. They have a yellow-brown to light reddish-brown, elongate-oval body. The upper surface is highly glossy, and glabrous except for a few hairs on the head.

== Etymology ==
The species name is derived from Latin pubes (meaning beard hair) and forceps and refers to the hairy paramere tips.
