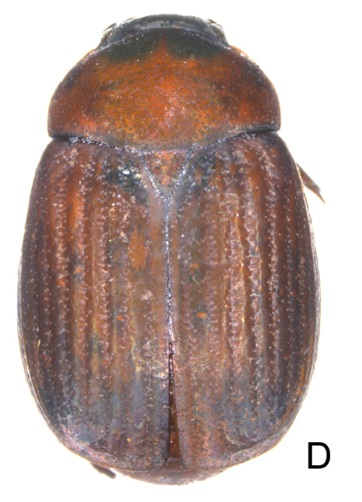

Scientific classification
- Kingdom: Animalia
- Phylum: Arthropoda
- Class: Insecta
- Order: Coleoptera
- Suborder: Polyphaga
- Infraorder: Scarabaeiformia
- Family: Scarabaeidae
- Genus: Neoserica
- Species: N. hainana

Binomial name
- Neoserica hainana (Brenske, 1899)

Synonyms
- Microserica hainana Brenske, 1899

= Neoserica hainana =

Species of beetle

Neoserica hainana is a species of beetle of the family Scarabaeidae. It is found in China (Hainan).

== Description ==
Adults reach a length of about 6.8 mm. They have a black, short-oval body. The elytra are reddish brown. The dorsal surface (except for the anterior labroclypeus) is dull and the pronotum and elytra are glabrous.
