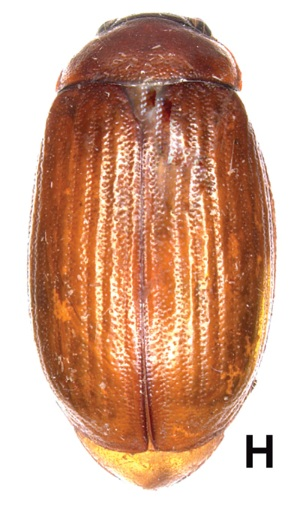

Scientific classification
- Kingdom: Animalia
- Phylum: Arthropoda
- Class: Insecta
- Order: Coleoptera
- Suborder: Polyphaga
- Infraorder: Scarabaeiformia
- Family: Scarabaeidae
- Genus: Neoserica
- Species: N. jiulongensis

Binomial name
- Neoserica jiulongensis Ahrens, Fabrizi & Liu, 2014

= Neoserica jiulongensis =

Species of beetle

Neoserica jiulongensis is a species of beetle of the family Scarabaeidae. It is found in China (Sichuan).

== Description ==
Adults reach a length of about 9.4 mm. They have a reddish brown, oblong body. The antennal club is yellowish brown. The dorsal surface is moderately shiny and nearly glabrous, except for a few long setae on the head.

== Etymology ==
The species is named after its type locality, Jiulong.
