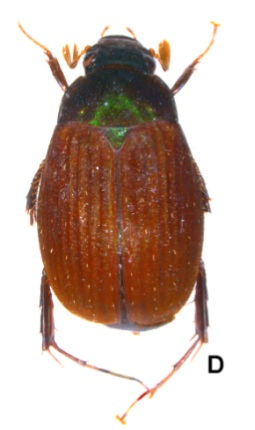

Scientific classification
- Kingdom: Animalia
- Phylum: Arthropoda
- Class: Insecta
- Order: Coleoptera
- Suborder: Polyphaga
- Infraorder: Scarabaeiformia
- Family: Scarabaeidae
- Genus: Neoserica
- Species: N. reuteri

Binomial name
- Neoserica reuteri Sreedevi, Ranasinghe, Fabrizi & Ahrens, 2019

= Neoserica reuteri =

Species of beetle

Neoserica reuteri is a species of beetle of the family Scarabaeidae. It is found in India (Arunachal Pradesh).

== Description ==
Adults reach a length of about 8.4 mm. They have a blackish dark brown, oblong body, the pronotum, scutellum, and head with a dark greenish shine. The elytra are dark reddish brown and the antennal club is yellowish brown. The anterior labroclypeus is shiny, but the dorsal surface is dull and sparsely setose.

== Etymology ==
The species is named after its collector, Christoph Reuter.
