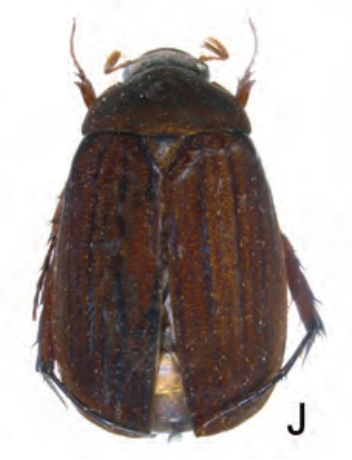

Scientific classification
- Kingdom: Animalia
- Phylum: Arthropoda
- Class: Insecta
- Order: Coleoptera
- Suborder: Polyphaga
- Infraorder: Scarabaeiformia
- Family: Scarabaeidae
- Genus: Neoserica
- Species: N. astuta

Binomial name
- Neoserica astuta Ahrens & Fabrizi, 2016

= Neoserica astuta =

Species of beetle

Neoserica astuta is a species of beetle of the family Scarabaeidae. It is found in India (Meghalaya).

== Description ==
Adults reach a length of about 14 mm. They have a dark brown, oblong body, with reddish brown punctures on the elytra. The antennal club is brown and the dorsal surface is dull and sparsely setose.

== Etymology ==
The species name is derived from Latin astutus (meaning cunning or artful).
