= Neoserica flavescens =

Scientific classification
- Kingdom: Animalia
- Phylum: Arthropoda
- Clade: Pancrustacea
- Class: Insecta
- Order: Coleoptera
- Suborder: Polyphaga
- Infraorder: Scarabaeiformia
- Family: Scarabaeidae
- Genus: Neoserica
- Species: N. flavescens

Binomial name
- Neoserica flavescens Moser, 1915

Synonyms
- Autoserica flaveola Moser, 1913

Species of beetle

Neoserica flavescens is a species of beetle of the family Scarabaeidae. It is found in Indonesia (Java).

== Description ==
Adults reach a length of about 6 mm (0.24 in). They are golden-yellow in colour and dull, although the legs are shiny. The head is widely punctate, the clypeus shiny, slightly tapered anteriorly, its margins are upturned, the anterior margin is barely perceptibly emarginate. The frons bears some striate, erect setae behind the clypeal suture. The punctation of the pronotum is barely visible and the anterior and lateral margins are covered with erect setae, and there are also scattered setae on the disc. The elytra are punctate, the intervals weakly convex and widely punctate. The elytra bear scattered, longer setae. The pygidium is weakly punctate and has a few setae before the posterior margin. The thorax is quite bristly in the middle, while the umbilical papillae on the sides bear only tiny setae. Each abdominal segment has a transverse row of setae.
