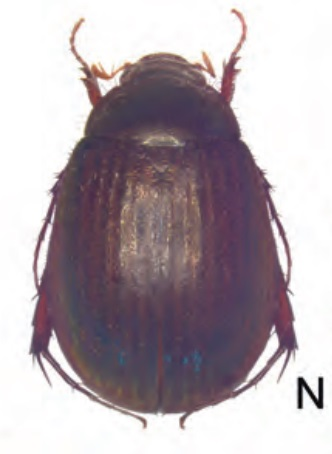

Scientific classification
- Kingdom: Animalia
- Phylum: Arthropoda
- Class: Insecta
- Order: Coleoptera
- Suborder: Polyphaga
- Infraorder: Scarabaeiformia
- Family: Scarabaeidae
- Genus: Neoserica
- Species: N. kalkadensis

Binomial name
- Neoserica kalkadensis Ahrens & Fabrizi, 2016

= Neoserica kalkadensis =

Species of beetle

Neoserica kalkadensis is a species of beetle of the family Scarabaeidae. It is found in India (Tamil Nadu, Kerala).

== Description ==
Adults reach a length of about 13–16.4 mm. They have a dark brown, egg-shaped body. The antennal club is yellowish brown and the dorsal surface is dull and sparsely setose.

== Etymology ==
The species is named for its type locality, the Kalkad wildlife sanctuary.
