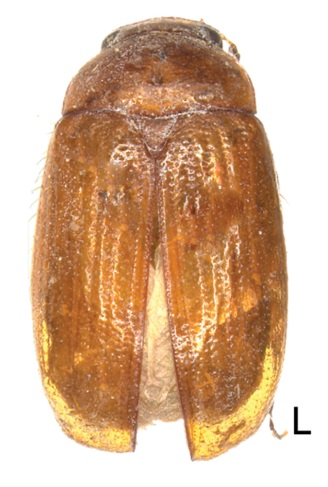

Scientific classification
- Kingdom: Animalia
- Phylum: Arthropoda
- Class: Insecta
- Order: Coleoptera
- Suborder: Polyphaga
- Infraorder: Scarabaeiformia
- Family: Scarabaeidae
- Genus: Neoserica
- Species: N. dongjiafenensis

Binomial name
- Neoserica dongjiafenensis Ahrens, Fabrizi & Liu, 2016

= Neoserica dongjiafenensis =

Species of beetle

Neoserica dongjiafenensis is a species of beetle of the family Scarabaeidae. It is found in China (Yunnan).

== Description ==
Adults reach a length of about 5.3–6.4 mm. They have a yellowish brown, oval body. The dorsal surface is strongly shiny and glabrous.

== Etymology ==
The species name is derived from the type locality, Dongjiafen.
