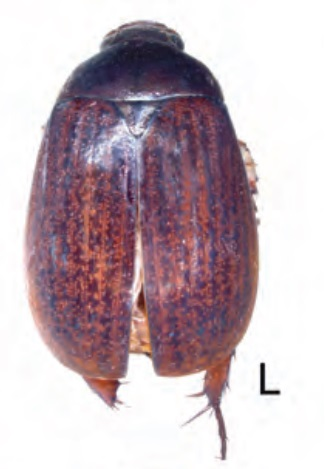

Scientific classification
- Kingdom: Animalia
- Phylum: Arthropoda
- Class: Insecta
- Order: Coleoptera
- Suborder: Polyphaga
- Infraorder: Scarabaeiformia
- Family: Scarabaeidae
- Genus: Neoserica
- Species: N. gravida

Binomial name
- Neoserica gravida Ahrens & Fabrizi, 2016

= Neoserica gravida =

Species of beetle

Neoserica gravida is a species of beetle of the family Scarabaeidae. It is found in southern India.

== Description ==
Adults reach a length of about 14–14.5 mm. They have a dark brown, oblong-oval body. The antennal club is brown and the dorsal surface is dull and sparsely setose.

== Etymology ==
The species name is derived from Latin gravidus (meaning full/heavy) and refers to the voluminous body shape.
