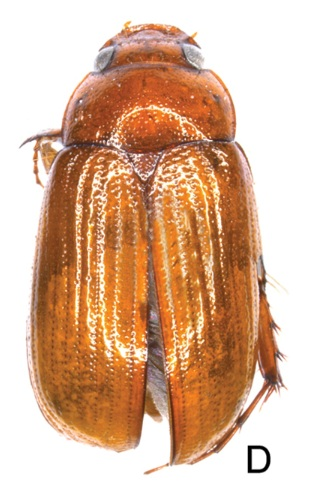

Scientific classification
- Kingdom: Animalia
- Phylum: Arthropoda
- Class: Insecta
- Order: Coleoptera
- Suborder: Polyphaga
- Infraorder: Scarabaeiformia
- Family: Scarabaeidae
- Genus: Neoserica
- Species: N. fugongensis

Binomial name
- Neoserica fugongensis Ahrens, Fabrizi & Liu, 2016

= Neoserica fugongensis =

Species of beetle

Neoserica fugongensis is a species of beetle of the family Scarabaeidae. It is found in China (Yunnan).

== Description ==
Adults reach a length of about 6.7 mm. They have a yellowish brown, oval body. The dorsal surface is strongly shiny and glabrous.

== Etymology ==
The species is named with reference to its type locality, Fugong.
