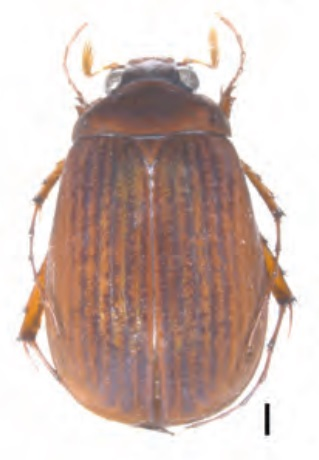

Scientific classification
- Kingdom: Animalia
- Phylum: Arthropoda
- Class: Insecta
- Order: Coleoptera
- Suborder: Polyphaga
- Infraorder: Scarabaeiformia
- Family: Scarabaeidae
- Genus: Neoserica
- Species: N. barberi

Binomial name
- Neoserica barberi (Sharp, 1903)

Synonyms
- Melaserica barberi Sharp, 1903

= Neoserica barberi =

Species of beetle

Neoserica barberi is a species of beetle of the family Scarabaeidae. It is found in southern India.

== Description ==
Adults reach a length of about 10.8 mm. They have a dark brown, oblong-oval body. The antennal club is brown and ventral surface is yellowish brown and the dorsal surface is dull, sparsely setose on the head and elytra.
