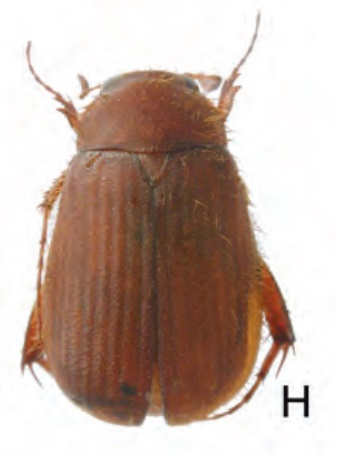

Scientific classification
- Kingdom: Animalia
- Phylum: Arthropoda
- Class: Insecta
- Order: Coleoptera
- Suborder: Polyphaga
- Infraorder: Scarabaeiformia
- Family: Scarabaeidae
- Genus: Neoserica
- Species: N. changrae

Binomial name
- Neoserica changrae Ahrens, 2004

= Neoserica changrae =

Species of beetle

Neoserica changrae is a species of beetle of the family Scarabaeidae. It is found in Bhutan.

== Description ==
Adults reach a length of about 8.3 mm. They have a reddish-brown, elongate-oval body. The upper surface is dull (except for the forehead) with many yellow hairs.

== Etymology ==
The species is named for its type locality, Changra.
