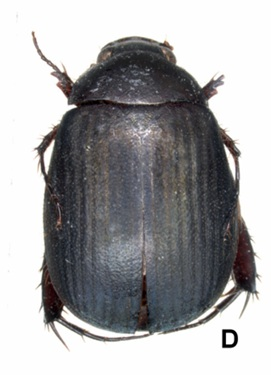

Scientific classification
- Kingdom: Animalia
- Phylum: Arthropoda
- Class: Insecta
- Order: Coleoptera
- Suborder: Polyphaga
- Infraorder: Scarabaeiformia
- Family: Scarabaeidae
- Genus: Neoserica
- Species: N. martinui

Binomial name
- Neoserica martinui Ahrens, Fabrizi & Liu, 2019

= Neoserica martinui =

Species of beetle

Neoserica martinui is a species of beetle of the family Scarabaeidae. It is found in China (Guangdong, Guangxi, Sichuan, Yunnan), Laos, Thailand and Vietnam.

== Description ==
Adults reach a length of about 9.8–11.4 mm. They have a dark brown, oblong body. The antennal club is yellowish brown and the dorsal surface is dull and nearly glabrous. The anterior labroclypeus is shiny.

== Etymology ==
The species is dedicated to one of its collectors, Ivo Martinů.
