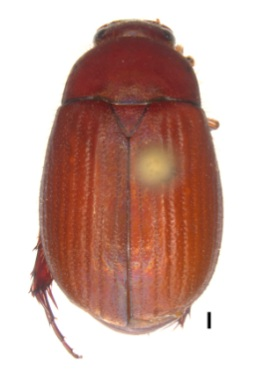

Scientific classification
- Kingdom: Animalia
- Phylum: Arthropoda
- Class: Insecta
- Order: Coleoptera
- Suborder: Polyphaga
- Infraorder: Scarabaeiformia
- Family: Scarabaeidae
- Genus: Neoserica
- Species: N. dharmapriyai

Binomial name
- Neoserica dharmapriyai Ranasinghe, Eberle, Benjamin & Ahrens, 2020

= Neoserica dharmapriyai =

Species of beetle

Neoserica dharmapriyai is a species of beetle of the family Scarabaeidae. It is found in Sri Lanka.

== Description ==
Adults reach a length of about 7.5 mm. They have a reddish brown, oval body. The antennae are pale. The labroclypeus is shiny and the dorsal surface is dull and, except for the dense pilosity on the head, almost glabrous.

== Etymology ==
The species is named after the husband of one of the authors, Prasanna Dharmapriya.
