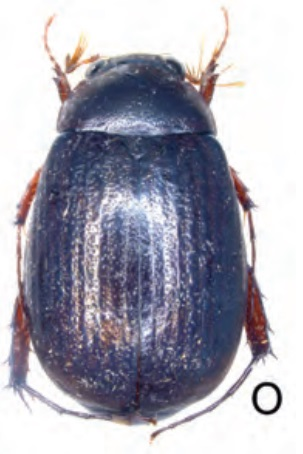

Scientific classification
- Kingdom: Animalia
- Phylum: Arthropoda
- Class: Insecta
- Order: Coleoptera
- Suborder: Polyphaga
- Infraorder: Scarabaeiformia
- Family: Scarabaeidae
- Genus: Neoserica
- Species: N. kejvali

Binomial name
- Neoserica kejvali Ahrens & Fabrizi, 2016

= Neoserica kejvali =

Species of beetle

Neoserica kejvali is a species of beetle of the family Scarabaeidae. It is found in India (Kerala).

== Description ==
Adults reach a length of about 12.4–13.6 mm. They have a dark brown, oval body. The antennal club is yellowish brown and the dorsal surface is dull and sparsely setose.

== Etymology ==
The species is named for one of its collectors, Z. Kejval.
