= Neoserica squamifera =

Scientific classification
- Kingdom: Animalia
- Phylum: Arthropoda
- Class: Insecta
- Order: Coleoptera
- Suborder: Polyphaga
- Infraorder: Scarabaeiformia
- Family: Scarabaeidae
- Genus: Neoserica
- Species: N. squamifera

Binomial name
- Neoserica squamifera Brenske, 1899

Species of beetle

Neoserica squamifera is a species of beetle of the family Scarabaeidae. It is found in Indonesia (Sumatra).

== Description ==
Adults reach a length of about 5.5 mm. They are dull, velvety, light reddish-brown underneath, darker above, with tiny white hairs in the punctures, and rows of small white scale-like hairs on the elytra. The clypeus is finely punctured, of equal width, with a setate puncture in the rounded corners, and slightly raised in the middle. The pronotum is slightly projecting anteriorly in the middle, scarcely rounded at the sides, and the posterior corners are slightly rounded. The scutellum is broadly smooth in the middle. The elytra are finely, irregularly punctured in the striae, with fairly distinct, tiny white hairs, and rows of white scale-like hairs on the smooth, narrow, rib-like, somewhat darker intervals. The pygidium is broadly rounded.
