= Neoserica fartula =

Scientific classification
- Kingdom: Animalia
- Phylum: Arthropoda
- Class: Insecta
- Order: Coleoptera
- Suborder: Polyphaga
- Infraorder: Scarabaeiformia
- Family: Scarabaeidae
- Genus: Neoserica
- Species: N. fartula

Binomial name
- Neoserica fartula (Péringuey, 1904)

Synonyms
- Autoserica fartula Péringuey, 1904

Species of beetle

Neoserica fartula is a species of beetle of the family Scarabaeidae. It is found in Mozambique, South Africa (KwaZulu-Natal) and Zimbabwe.

== Description ==
Adults reach a length of about 9.5–11.5 mm. They are fuscous with a metallic tinge, and occasionally with the elytra chestnut-brown and the costules darker, not tessellate. The prothorax is covered with moderately closely set punctures bearing each a minute flavescent hair. The punctures on the scutellum are deep and the hairs longer, but appressed. The wide, convex elytra have along the base, on each side of the scutellum, squamose appressed hairs longer and denser than those springing from the somewhat scattered, shallow punctures of the surface, and in addition five partly gemminate rows on each side of remote sub-erect, white, bristle-like hairs.
