= Neoserica lubrica =

Scientific classification
- Kingdom: Animalia
- Phylum: Arthropoda
- Class: Insecta
- Order: Coleoptera
- Suborder: Polyphaga
- Infraorder: Scarabaeiformia
- Family: Scarabaeidae
- Genus: Neoserica
- Species: N. lubrica

Binomial name
- Neoserica lubrica Brenske, 1899

Species of beetle

Neoserica lubrica is a species of beetle of the family Scarabaeidae. It is found in Myanmar.

== Description ==
Adults reach a length of about 5.5–6 mm. They are strikingly shiny and smooth and yellow to yellowish-brown in colour, without pubescence. The clypeus is strongly tapered, truncate, broadly marginate anteriorly, the corners only slightly rounded. It is finely punctate with a distinct tubercle in the middle, from which a weakly raised line extends to the frons. This frons is finely punctate and the suture is very indistinct. The pronotum is straight at the sides, the posterior angles are right-angled, not rounded, the surface is densely and finely punctate, the anterior margin slightly projecting in the middle. The elytra are narrowly striated, the striations densely and irregularly punctate, the intervals narrowly smooth. The scutellum is elongate and the pygidium is pointed.
