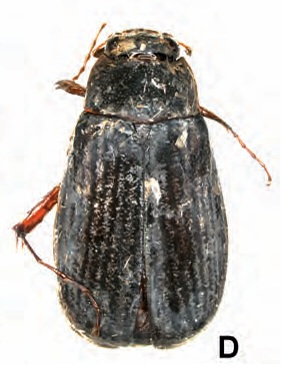

Scientific classification
- Kingdom: Animalia
- Phylum: Arthropoda
- Class: Insecta
- Order: Coleoptera
- Suborder: Polyphaga
- Infraorder: Scarabaeiformia
- Family: Scarabaeidae
- Genus: Neoserica
- Species: N. kachinensis

Binomial name
- Neoserica kachinensis Ahrens & Fabrizi, 2011

= Neoserica kachinensis =

Species of beetle

Neoserica kachinensis is a species of beetle of the family Scarabaeidae. It is found in Myanmar.

== Description ==
Adults reach a length of about 10 mm. They have an dark brown, oblong body. The legs are reddish brown and the antennal club is yellowish brown. The dorsal surface is mostly dull and nearly glabrous.

== Etymology ==
The species is named after its occurrence in Kanching state.
