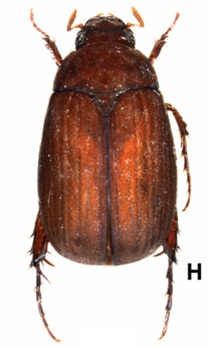

Scientific classification
- Kingdom: Animalia
- Phylum: Arthropoda
- Class: Insecta
- Order: Coleoptera
- Suborder: Polyphaga
- Infraorder: Scarabaeiformia
- Family: Scarabaeidae
- Genus: Neoserica
- Species: N. milani

Binomial name
- Neoserica milani Ahrens, Fabrizi & Liu, 2019

= Neoserica milani =

Species of beetle

Neoserica milani is a species of beetle of the family Scarabaeidae. It is found in China (Yunnan).

== Description ==
Adults reach a length of about 8.4–9 mm. They have a reddish brown, oblong body. The antennal club is yellowish brown, the dorsal surface is dull and nearly glabrous and the anterior labroclypeus is shiny.

== Etymology ==
The species is dedicated to Milan Nikodým (Prague, Czech Republic) as thanks for the donation of his Sericini collection to one of the authors.
