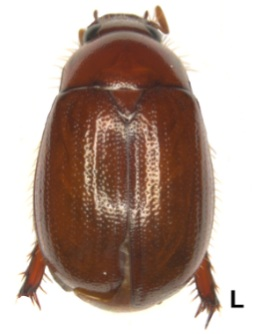

Scientific classification
- Kingdom: Animalia
- Phylum: Arthropoda
- Class: Insecta
- Order: Coleoptera
- Suborder: Polyphaga
- Infraorder: Scarabaeiformia
- Family: Scarabaeidae
- Genus: Neoserica
- Species: N. pophami

Binomial name
- Neoserica pophami Ranasinghe et al., 2022

= Neoserica pophami =

Species of beetle

Neoserica pophami is a species of beetle of the family Scarabaeidae. It is found in Sri Lanka.

== Description ==
Adults reach a length of about 6–6.8 mm (males) and 6.8–7.2 mm (females). They have an oval light reddish brown body. The antennae are yellow and the dorsal area is completely shiny, except for a few setae on the head which are almost glabrous.

== Etymology ==
The species is named after Mr Sam Popham, founder of the NIFS Arboretum.
