= Neoserica limbangica =

Scientific classification
- Kingdom: Animalia
- Phylum: Arthropoda
- Clade: Pancrustacea
- Class: Insecta
- Order: Coleoptera
- Suborder: Polyphaga
- Infraorder: Scarabaeiformia
- Family: Scarabaeidae
- Genus: Neoserica
- Species: N. limbangica

Binomial name
- Neoserica limbangica Moser, 1915

Species of beetle

Neoserica limbangica is a species of beetle of the family Scarabaeidae. It is found in Malaysia (Sarawak).

== Description ==
Adults reach a length of about 9.5 mm. The upper surface is blackish-brown and faintly opalescent and the underside is reddish-brown. Due to the dense tomentum covering of the frons, the punctation is only faintly visible. A few setae are present next to the eyes and the antennae are yellowish-brown. The pronotum has densely spaced, minutely bristle-covered punctures and the slightly curved lateral margins are covered with erect setae. The elytra have three more or less distinct rows of punctures in the striae. The very shallowly convex interspaces are extensively punctate, the punctures covered with tiny setae. Slightly more distinct setae are occasionally found on the sides of the elytra.
