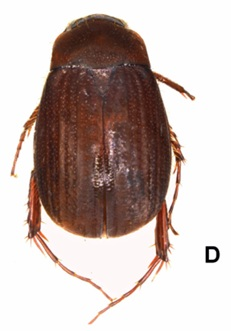

Scientific classification
- Kingdom: Animalia
- Phylum: Arthropoda
- Class: Insecta
- Order: Coleoptera
- Suborder: Polyphaga
- Infraorder: Scarabaeiformia
- Family: Scarabaeidae
- Genus: Neoserica
- Species: N. leigongshanica

Binomial name
- Neoserica leigongshanica Ahrens, Fabrizi & Liu, 2019

= Neoserica leigongshanica =

Species of beetle

Neoserica leigongshanica is a species of beetle of the family Scarabaeidae. It is found in China (Guizhou).

== Description ==
Adults reach a length of about 6.2 mm. They have a dark brown, oblong body. The antennal club is yellowish brown. The dorsal surface is dull or weakly shiny and nearly glabrous and the labroclypeus is shiny.

== Etymology ==
The species is named after its type locality, Leigongshan mountain.
