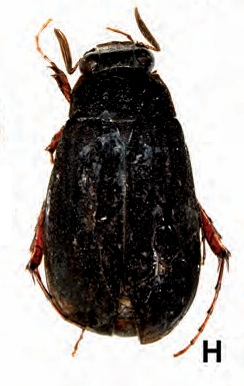

Scientific classification
- Kingdom: Animalia
- Phylum: Arthropoda
- Class: Insecta
- Order: Coleoptera
- Suborder: Polyphaga
- Infraorder: Scarabaeiformia
- Family: Scarabaeidae
- Genus: Neoserica
- Species: N. loeffleri

Binomial name
- Neoserica loeffleri Ahrens & Fabrizi, 2011

= Neoserica loeffleri =

Species of beetle

Neoserica loeffleri is a species of beetle of the family Scarabaeidae. It is found in Myanmar.

== Description ==
Adults reach a length of about 9 mm. They have an dark brown, oblong body. The legs are reddish brown and the antennal club is yellowish brown. The dorsal surface is mostly dull and nearly glabrous.

== Etymology ==
The species is named after one of its collectors, S. Löffler.
