= Neoserica iringensis =

Scientific classification
- Kingdom: Animalia
- Phylum: Arthropoda
- Clade: Pancrustacea
- Class: Insecta
- Order: Coleoptera
- Suborder: Polyphaga
- Infraorder: Scarabaeiformia
- Family: Scarabaeidae
- Genus: Neoserica
- Species: N. iringensis

Binomial name
- Neoserica iringensis (Moser, 1916)

Synonyms
- Autoserica iringensis Moser, 1916

Species of beetle

Neoserica iringensis is a species of beetle of the family Scarabaeidae. It is found in Tanzania.

== Description ==
Adults reach a length of about 9 mm. They are brown and only thinly tomentose and therefore silky-shimmering. The frons is quite densely punctate. The punctures are rather strong due to the tomentose covering. The antennae are yellowish-brown. The pronotum has moderately dense, irregular punctation and these punctures are minutely setate. The lateral margins have erect setae. The elytra have rows of punctures, with the intervals only very slightly convex, somewhat darkened, and sparsely punctate. The punctures are covered with extremely fine and short, and occasionally also with somewhat more pronounced setae.
