= Neoserica absoluta =

Scientific classification
- Kingdom: Animalia
- Phylum: Arthropoda
- Class: Insecta
- Order: Coleoptera
- Suborder: Polyphaga
- Infraorder: Scarabaeiformia
- Family: Scarabaeidae
- Genus: Neoserica
- Species: N. absoluta

Binomial name
- Neoserica absoluta (Brenske, 1899)

Synonyms
- Autoserica absoluta Brenske, 1899

Species of beetle

Maladera absoluta is a species of beetle of the family Scarabaeidae. It is found in Singapore.

== Description ==
Adults reach a length of about 6 mm. They are oval, brown and dull, the elytra finely striated with tiny hairs. The clypeus is broad, less tapered, finely punctate with a slight elevation in the middle, with a few setae in front of it. The pronotum is only slightly transverse, projecting slightly anteriorly in the middle, straight at the sides, distinctly wider posteriorly, with tiny hairs in the punctures. The elytra are densely punctate in the striae, with minute pubescence. The intervals are very narrow, without punctures and weakly raised, but forming distinct fine ridges. The pygidium is pointed.
