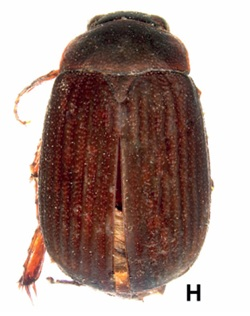

Scientific classification
- Kingdom: Animalia
- Phylum: Arthropoda
- Class: Insecta
- Order: Coleoptera
- Suborder: Polyphaga
- Infraorder: Scarabaeiformia
- Family: Scarabaeidae
- Genus: Neoserica
- Species: N. defuensis

Binomial name
- Neoserica defuensis Ahrens, Fabrizi & Liu, 2019

= Neoserica defuensis =

Species of beetle

Neoserica defuensis is a species of beetle of the family Scarabaeidae. It is found in China (Guangxi).

== Description ==
Adults reach a length of about 7 mm. They have a dark reddish brown, oblong body. The antennal club is yellowish brown. The dorsal surface is dull and nearly glabrous and the labroclypeus and anterior two thirds of the frons are shiny.

== Etymology ==
The species is named after the type locality, Defu.
