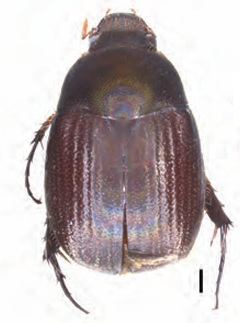

Scientific classification
- Kingdom: Animalia
- Phylum: Arthropoda
- Class: Insecta
- Order: Coleoptera
- Suborder: Polyphaga
- Infraorder: Scarabaeiformia
- Family: Scarabaeidae
- Genus: Neoserica
- Species: N. diciplineensis

Binomial name
- Neoserica diciplineensis Ahrens & Fabrizi, 2016

= Neoserica diciplineensis =

Species of beetle

Neoserica diciplineensis is a species of beetle of the family Scarabaeidae. It is found in India (Tamil Nadu).

== Description ==
Adults reach a length of about 7.8–8.1 mm. They have a dark brown, oval body, but the antennae are yellowish brown. The dorsal surface is dull and nearly glabrous, except for some hairs on the head.

== Etymology ==
The species is named for its type locality, the village of Discipline.
