= Neoserica sharpi =

Scientific classification
- Kingdom: Animalia
- Phylum: Arthropoda
- Class: Insecta
- Order: Coleoptera
- Suborder: Polyphaga
- Infraorder: Scarabaeiformia
- Family: Scarabaeidae
- Genus: Neoserica
- Species: N. sharpi

Binomial name
- Neoserica sharpi Brenske, 1899

Species of beetle

Neoserica sharpi is a species of beetle of the family Scarabaeidae. It is found in Indonesia (Sumatra).

== Description ==
Adults reach a length of about 14 mm. They are glossy dark brown, without a greenish sheen. The clypeus is broad, tapering anteriorly, evenly but not very densely punctate, but without setae. The frons is even more widely punctate. The anterior margin of the pronotum is projecting in the middle, the sides straight, widening evenly posteriorly, the posterior angles rounded, the surface evenly, almost widely, strongly punctate, the lateral setae are weak. The elytra are evenly widely punctate, the striae marked by a row of punctures. The outer margin is weakly set off, distinctly dull posteriorly. The pygidium is slightly tapered and widely punctate.
