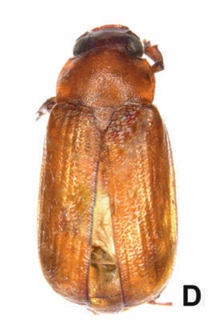

Scientific classification
- Kingdom: Animalia
- Phylum: Arthropoda
- Class: Insecta
- Order: Coleoptera
- Suborder: Polyphaga
- Infraorder: Scarabaeiformia
- Family: Scarabaeidae
- Genus: Neoserica
- Species: N. xizangensis

Binomial name
- Neoserica xizangensis Liu & Ahrens, 2014

= Neoserica xizangensis =

Species of beetle

Neoserica xizangensis is a species of beetle of the family Scarabaeidae. It is found in Tibet (China).

== Description ==
Adults reach a length of about 7.3–8 mm. They have an oblong body. Their body, including legs, is yellowish brown, with the head slightly darker. The antennae are yellow. The dorsal surface is shiny and nearly glabrous.

== Etymology ==
The species is named after its occurrence in Tibet (=Xizang in Chinese).
