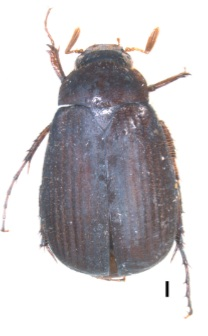

Scientific classification
- Kingdom: Animalia
- Phylum: Arthropoda
- Class: Insecta
- Order: Coleoptera
- Suborder: Polyphaga
- Infraorder: Scarabaeiformia
- Family: Scarabaeidae
- Genus: Neoserica
- Species: N. myanmarensis

Binomial name
- Neoserica myanmarensis Ahrens, 2023

= Neoserica myanmarensis =

Species of beetle

Neoserica myanmarensis is a species of beetle of the family Scarabaeidae. It is found in the China (Yunnan) and Myanmar.

== Description ==
Adults reach a length of about 8.4–8.6 mm. Their body is oblong and dark brown, with the ventral surface and antenna yellow, and the dorsal surface dull and with numerous shorter and long, erect setae.

== Etymology ==
The species is named for its occurrence in Myanmar.
