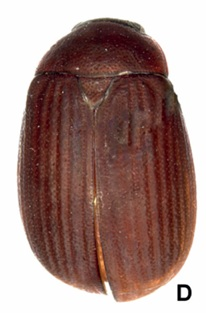

Scientific classification
- Kingdom: Animalia
- Phylum: Arthropoda
- Class: Insecta
- Order: Coleoptera
- Suborder: Polyphaga
- Infraorder: Scarabaeiformia
- Family: Scarabaeidae
- Genus: Neoserica
- Species: N. sangangensis

Binomial name
- Neoserica sangangensis Ahrens, Fabrizi & Liu, 2019

= Neoserica sangangensis =

Species of beetle

Neoserica sangangensis is a species of beetle of the family Scarabaeidae. It is found in China (Fujian).

== Description ==
Adults reach a length of about 7.6 mm. They have a dark reddish brown, oblong body. The antennal club is yellowish brown, the dorsal surface is dull and nearly glabrous and the labroclypeus is shiny.

== Etymology ==
The species is named after the type locality, San’gang.
