= Neoserica sericina =

Scientific classification
- Kingdom: Animalia
- Phylum: Arthropoda
- Clade: Pancrustacea
- Class: Insecta
- Order: Coleoptera
- Suborder: Polyphaga
- Infraorder: Scarabaeiformia
- Family: Scarabaeidae
- Genus: Neoserica
- Species: N. sericina

Binomial name
- Neoserica sericina (Moser, 1916)

Synonyms
- Autoserica sericina Moser, 1916

Species of beetle

Neoserica sericina is a species of beetle of the family Scarabaeidae. It is found in Cameroon.

== Description ==
Adults reach a length of about 9 mm. They are black above and brown below, and only very thinly covered with tomentum, giving it a silky sheen and a slight opalescence. The frons is irregularly punctate and the antennae are yellowish-brown. The pronotum is fairly densely covered with extremely minutely bristle-bearing punctures. The lateral margins are slightly curved and covered with erect setae. The elytra have rows of punctures, the very weakly convex interstices showing extensive punctation. All punctures are covered with very short setae, with some longer setae.
