= Neoserica guinesis =

Scientific classification
- Kingdom: Animalia
- Phylum: Arthropoda
- Class: Insecta
- Order: Coleoptera
- Suborder: Polyphaga
- Infraorder: Scarabaeiformia
- Family: Scarabaeidae
- Genus: Neoserica
- Species: N. guinesis

Binomial name
- Neoserica guinesis (Brenske, 1901)

Synonyms
- Lepiserica guinesis Brenske, 1901; Autoserica guinesis

Species of beetle

Neoserica guinesis is a species of beetle of the family Scarabaeidae. It is found in Ghana.

== Description ==
Adults reach a length of about 8 mm. They are very densely tomentose all over with small hairs. The pronotum tapers anteriorly, slightly projecting in the middle at the anterior margin, the hind angles very sharply angular, the lateral setae weak, the surface greenish with minute hairs in the punctures. The elytra are the same colour, uniformly densely tomentose, with very faintly discernible ribs. The hairs are somewhat more distinct here, especially dense at the base and on the scutellum, with white scale-like hairs in between.
