= Neoserica iringana =

Scientific classification
- Kingdom: Animalia
- Phylum: Arthropoda
- Clade: Pancrustacea
- Class: Insecta
- Order: Coleoptera
- Suborder: Polyphaga
- Infraorder: Scarabaeiformia
- Family: Scarabaeidae
- Genus: Neoserica
- Species: N. iringana

Binomial name
- Neoserica iringana (Moser, 1916)

Synonyms
- Autoserica iringana Moser, 1916

Species of beetle

Neoserica iringana is a species of beetle of the family Scarabaeidae. It is found in Tanzania.

== Description ==
Adults reach a length of about 8 mm. They are dull and reddish-brown, lighter on the underside. The frons is quite densely punctate and thinly tomentose. The antennae are reddish-brown, with a slightly lighter club. The pronotum is densely punctate and the punctures are minutely setate. Both the anterior margin and the lateral margins have erect setae. The elytra are densely punctate in the striae, with the slightly convex intervals with only scattered punctures. The punctures are covered with tiny setae and some punctures have more pronounced setae.
