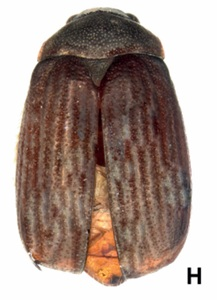

Scientific classification
- Kingdom: Animalia
- Phylum: Arthropoda
- Class: Insecta
- Order: Coleoptera
- Suborder: Polyphaga
- Infraorder: Scarabaeiformia
- Family: Scarabaeidae
- Genus: Neoserica
- Species: N. nannuoshanica

Binomial name
- Neoserica nannuoshanica Ahrens, Fabrizi & Liu, 2019

= Neoserica nannuoshanica =

Species of beetle

Neoserica nannuoshanica is a species of beetle of the family Scarabaeidae. It is found in China (Yunnan).

== Description ==
Adults reach a length of about 7.4 mm. They have a dark brown, oval body. The antennal club is yellowish brown, the dorsal surface is dull and nearly glabrous and the forehead is shiny.

== Etymology ==
The species is named after the type locality, Nannuoshan.
