= Neoserica nigrescens =

Scientific classification
- Kingdom: Animalia
- Phylum: Arthropoda
- Clade: Pancrustacea
- Class: Insecta
- Order: Coleoptera
- Suborder: Polyphaga
- Infraorder: Scarabaeiformia
- Family: Scarabaeidae
- Genus: Neoserica
- Species: N. nigrescens

Binomial name
- Neoserica nigrescens Moser, 1915

Species of beetle

Neoserica nigrescens is a species of beetle of the family Scarabaeidae. It is found in Malaysia (Sabah).

== Description ==
Adults reach a length of about 10 mm. They are shiny and blackish-brown, almost black on the upper surface, while the underside is narrowly dull at the sides. The head is fairly extensively covered with coarse punctures and has some setae. The frons shows an unpunctured median longitudinal line and the antennae are yellowish-brown. The pronotum is densely punctured, and the slightly curved lateral margins are setate. The elytra have rows of punctures, with the flat intervals sparsely punctured. There are very faint, narrow, smooth ridges towards the sides of the elytra.
