= Neoserica harrarensis =

Scientific classification
- Kingdom: Animalia
- Phylum: Arthropoda
- Clade: Pancrustacea
- Class: Insecta
- Order: Coleoptera
- Suborder: Polyphaga
- Infraorder: Scarabaeiformia
- Family: Scarabaeidae
- Genus: Neoserica
- Species: N. harrarensis

Binomial name
- Neoserica harrarensis Moser, 1916

Species of beetle

Neoserica harrarensis is a species of beetle of the family Scarabaeidae. It is found in Ethiopia.

== Description ==
Adults reach a length of about 10 mm. They are dull and brown and slightly darker above. The frons is dull, sparsely punctate and has scattered setae beside the eyes and behind the suture. The antennae are yellowish-brown. The pronotum is quite densely punctate, with the punctures covered with extremely minute setae. The setate lateral margins are slightly curved. The elytra have rows of punctures, with the intervals very weakly convex, somewhat darkened, and sparsely punctate. The punctures are covered with tiny setae, and the alternating spaces have some more distinct setae.
