= Neoserica kamerunica =

Scientific classification
- Kingdom: Animalia
- Phylum: Arthropoda
- Clade: Pancrustacea
- Class: Insecta
- Order: Coleoptera
- Suborder: Polyphaga
- Infraorder: Scarabaeiformia
- Family: Scarabaeidae
- Genus: Neoserica
- Species: N. kamerunica

Binomial name
- Neoserica kamerunica (Moser, 1916)

Synonyms
- Autoserica kamerunica Moser, 1916

Species of beetle

Neoserica kamerunica is a species of beetle of the family Scarabaeidae. It is found in Cameroon.

== Description ==
Adults reach a length of about 9 mm. They are dull, dark brown above and somewhat lighter below. The frons is tomentose, sparsely punctate, and has some setae. The antennae are reddish-yellow. The pronotum is moderately densely covered with punctures with tiny setae. The lateral margins are covered with erect setae. The elytra have rows of punctures, with the intervals very weakly convex and sparsely punctate. The spots are tiny and setate, with some spots with slightly larger setae.
