= Neoserica rugiceps =

Scientific classification
- Kingdom: Animalia
- Phylum: Arthropoda
- Clade: Pancrustacea
- Class: Insecta
- Order: Coleoptera
- Suborder: Polyphaga
- Infraorder: Scarabaeiformia
- Family: Scarabaeidae
- Genus: Neoserica
- Species: N. rugiceps

Binomial name
- Neoserica rugiceps Moser, 1917

Species of beetle

Neoserica rugiceps is a species of beetle of the family Scarabaeidae. It is found in Cameroon.

== Description ==
Adults reach a length of about 7 mm. They are brown, with a silky sheen. The frons is irregularly punctured and next to the eyes and at the suture are several strong, bristle-bearing punctures. The antennae are yellowish-brown. The pronotum is rather densely punctured and the bristle-bearing lateral margins are almost straight posteriorly and curved inwards anteriorly. The elytra have rows of punctures, the spaces between them weakly convex and quite widely punctured. The punctures have tiny setae and distinct light bristles are present in the alternating spaces between them.
