= Neoserica schoolmeestersi =

Scientific classification
- Kingdom: Animalia
- Phylum: Arthropoda
- Clade: Pancrustacea
- Class: Insecta
- Order: Coleoptera
- Suborder: Polyphaga
- Infraorder: Scarabaeiformia
- Family: Scarabaeidae
- Genus: Neoserica
- Species: N. schoolmeestersi

Binomial name
- Neoserica schoolmeestersi Ahrens, 2019

Synonyms
- Neoserica vicina Ahrens, 2003 (nec Moser, 1915)

Species of beetle

Neoserica schoolmeestersi is a species of beetle of the family Scarabaeidae. It is found in Thailand.

== Description ==
Adults reach a length of about 5.8–7 mm. They have a reddish dark brown, elongate-oval body. The underside is dark brown, while the head and pronotum are also dark brown, but partly with a greenish sheen. They are mostly dull with dense short hairs, interspersed with dense, erect, long, strong, light-colored hairs.

== Etymology ==
The species is dedicated to Paul Schoolmeesters.
