= Neoserica davaoensis =

Scientific classification
- Kingdom: Animalia
- Phylum: Arthropoda
- Clade: Pancrustacea
- Class: Insecta
- Order: Coleoptera
- Suborder: Polyphaga
- Infraorder: Scarabaeiformia
- Family: Scarabaeidae
- Genus: Neoserica
- Species: N. davaoensis

Binomial name
- Neoserica davaoensis (Moser, 1917)

Synonyms
- Autoserica davaoensis Moser, 1917

Species of beetle

Neoserica davaoensis is a species of beetle of the family Scarabaeidae. It is found in the Philippines (Mindanao).

== Description ==
Adults reach a length of about 6 mm. They are dull, blackish-brown above and brown below. The forehead is finely punctured due to the tomentum clothing and there are a few setae beside the eyes. The antennae are brown. The pronotum is moderately densely covered with minute setae, and the anterior margin and the lateral margins are covered with erect setae. The elytra have rows of punctures, the intervals only very weakly convex and sparsely punctate. All punctures have minute setae.
