= Neoserica dilatatipes =

Scientific classification
- Kingdom: Animalia
- Phylum: Arthropoda
- Clade: Pancrustacea
- Class: Insecta
- Order: Coleoptera
- Suborder: Polyphaga
- Infraorder: Scarabaeiformia
- Family: Scarabaeidae
- Genus: Neoserica
- Species: N. dilatatipes

Binomial name
- Neoserica dilatatipes (Moser, 1916)

Synonyms
- Autoserica dilatatipes Moser, 1916

Species of beetle

Neoserica dilatatipes is a species of beetle of the family Scarabaeidae. It is found in Cameroon.

== Description ==
Adults reach a length of about 8.5 mm. They are dull, blackish-brown above and brown below. The frons is dull, finely punctate, and has two setae on each side behind the suture. The antennae are yellowish-brown. The pronotum has a moderately dense punctation, with setae on the sides. The elytra have regular rows of punctures, with the intervals only very weakly convex and rather sparsely punctate. The spots are covered with tiny setae, with a few slightly larger setae.
