= Neoserica longicornis =

Scientific classification
- Kingdom: Animalia
- Phylum: Arthropoda
- Clade: Pancrustacea
- Class: Insecta
- Order: Coleoptera
- Suborder: Polyphaga
- Infraorder: Scarabaeiformia
- Family: Scarabaeidae
- Genus: Neoserica
- Species: N. longicornis

Binomial name
- Neoserica longicornis (Moser, 1917)

Synonyms
- Autoserica longicornis Moser, 1917

Species of beetle

Neoserica longicornis is a species of beetle of the family Scarabaeidae. It is found in Cameroon.

== Description ==
Adults reach a length of about 8–9 mm. They are dull, black above and brown below. The frons is moderately densely punctate, with a few erect setae beside the eyes. The antennae are yellowish-brown, with a yellow club. The pronotum is quite densely punctate and the scutellum is punctate except for a midline. The elytra have punctures and the widely punctate intervals are weakly convex. All punctures have tiny setae. On the alternating intervals is a longitudinal row of distinct, lighter setae.
