= Neoserica penangica =

Scientific classification
- Kingdom: Animalia
- Phylum: Arthropoda
- Class: Insecta
- Order: Coleoptera
- Suborder: Polyphaga
- Infraorder: Scarabaeiformia
- Family: Scarabaeidae
- Genus: Neoserica
- Species: N. penangica

Binomial name
- Neoserica penangica Brenske, 1899

Species of beetle

Neoserica penangica is a species of beetle of the family Scarabaeidae. It is found in Indonesia (Sumatra).

== Description ==
Adults reach a length of about 8 mm. They are slightly dull and brown. The clypeus is broad, the corners distinctly rounded, therefore less tapered anteriorly. It is finely punctate, with very faint longitudinal elevation, visible only from the side. The setae in the corners of the eyes are weak and the frons is very finely punctate. The pronotum is short, distinctly transverse, projecting in the middle, rounded at the sides with obtuse posterior angles. The elytra are densely and confusedly punctate in the striae, the 2nd and 5th intervals slightly raised. The pygidium is rounded.
