= Neoserica insulicola =

Scientific classification
- Kingdom: Animalia
- Phylum: Arthropoda
- Clade: Pancrustacea
- Class: Insecta
- Order: Coleoptera
- Suborder: Polyphaga
- Infraorder: Scarabaeiformia
- Family: Scarabaeidae
- Genus: Neoserica
- Species: N. insulicola

Binomial name
- Neoserica insulicola (Moser, 1916)

Synonyms
- Autoserica insulicola Moser, 1916

Species of beetle

Neoserica insulicola is a species of beetle of the family Scarabaeidae. It is found in Tanzania.

== Description ==
Adults reach a length of about 8.5 mm. The head has a row of setae behind the suture and another behind the anterior margin. The frons is dull and finely punctate and the antennae are yellowish-brown. The pronotum has moderately dense punctation, each puncture with a tiny seta. The lateral margins are also setate. The elytra have regular rows of punctures, with the intervals almost flat and fairly widely punctured. All punctures have tiny setae and some punctures have somewhat more pronounced setae.
