= Neoserica pusilla =

Scientific classification
- Kingdom: Animalia
- Phylum: Arthropoda
- Clade: Pancrustacea
- Class: Insecta
- Order: Coleoptera
- Suborder: Polyphaga
- Infraorder: Scarabaeiformia
- Family: Scarabaeidae
- Genus: Neoserica
- Species: N. pusilla

Binomial name
- Neoserica pusilla (Moser, 1918)

Synonyms
- Autoserica pusilla Moser, 1918

Species of beetle

Neoserica pusilla is a species of beetle of the family Scarabaeidae. It is found in Laos.

== Description ==
Adults reach a length of about 4.5 mm. They are black, dull and opalescent above and blackish-brown below. The frons is moderately densely punctured and the antennae are reddish-yellow. The anterior margin and the lateral margins of the pronotum are covered with yellow setae and the surface of the pronotum is fairly densely and finely punctured. The elytra have rows of punctures, with the intervals sparsely punctured. The spots punctures have tiny setae. The lateral margins of the elytra are setose.
