= Neoserica flaviventris =

Scientific classification
- Kingdom: Animalia
- Phylum: Arthropoda
- Clade: Pancrustacea
- Class: Insecta
- Order: Coleoptera
- Suborder: Polyphaga
- Infraorder: Scarabaeiformia
- Family: Scarabaeidae
- Genus: Neoserica
- Species: N. flaviventris

Binomial name
- Neoserica flaviventris (Moser, 1916)

Synonyms
- Autoserica flaviventris Moser, 1916

Species of beetle

Neoserica flaviventris is a species of beetle of the family Scarabaeidae. It is found in the Democratic Republic of the Congo.

== Description ==
Adults reach a length of about 7.5 mm. They are dull. The frons is black and very sparsely punctate, the punctures with short setae. The antennae are brown. The pronotum is yellowish-brown with a large black center and is quite sparsely covered with minutely bristle-bearing punctures. The elytra are moderately densely punctate in the brown stripes, while the intervals are black, with the punctures only very sparsely distributed. All punctures have tiny setae.
