= Neoserica flavopicta =

Scientific classification
- Kingdom: Animalia
- Phylum: Arthropoda
- Class: Insecta
- Order: Coleoptera
- Suborder: Polyphaga
- Infraorder: Scarabaeiformia
- Family: Scarabaeidae
- Genus: Neoserica
- Species: N. flavopicta

Binomial name
- Neoserica flavopicta (Frey, 1972)

Synonyms
- Autoserica flavopicta Frey, 1972

Species of beetle

Neoserica flavopicta is a species of beetle of the family Scarabaeidae. It is found in Vietnam.

== Description ==
Adults reach a length of about 4–5 mm. The upper and lower surfaces are blackish-brown, dull, partly tomentose and with a glossy clypeus. The elytra have a broad yellowish-brown stripe, which is sometimes divided into two spots, and sometimes only faintly indicated. The head and pronotum have a metallic sheen and there a few light setae on the head. The anterior and lateral margins of the pronotum and elytra, as well as the apex of the pygidium all have fairly long, light grey cilia.
