= Neoserica maritima =

Scientific classification
- Kingdom: Animalia
- Phylum: Arthropoda
- Clade: Pancrustacea
- Class: Insecta
- Order: Coleoptera
- Suborder: Polyphaga
- Infraorder: Scarabaeiformia
- Family: Scarabaeidae
- Genus: Neoserica
- Species: N. maritima

Binomial name
- Neoserica maritima (Moser, 1916)

Synonyms
- Autoserica maritima Moser, 1916

Species of beetle

Neoserica maritima is a species of beetle of the family Scarabaeidae. It is found in Ivory Coast.

== Description ==
Adults reach a length of about 6.5 mm. They are brown and sull, slightly darker above than below. The frons is tomentose and moderately densely covered with punctures and the antennae are yellowish-brown, with a yellow club. The pronotum has fairly dense, minutely bristle-covered punctures and the lateral margins are covered with setae. The elytra have rows of punctures, with the weakly convex intervals sparsely punctured. The punctures are covered with minute setae, some of which are more distinct.
