= Neoserica seriata =

Scientific classification
- Kingdom: Animalia
- Phylum: Arthropoda
- Clade: Pancrustacea
- Class: Insecta
- Order: Coleoptera
- Suborder: Polyphaga
- Infraorder: Scarabaeiformia
- Family: Scarabaeidae
- Genus: Neoserica
- Species: N. seriata

Binomial name
- Neoserica seriata (Moser, 1917)

Synonyms
- Autoserica seriata Moser, 1917

Species of beetle

Neoserica seriata is a species of beetle of the family Scarabaeidae. It is found in Zimbabwe.

== Description ==
Adults reach a length of about 8.5 mm. They are dull, blackish-brown above and brown below. The frons is dull, with a few setae behind the suture and beside the eyes. The antennae are reddish-brown with a yellow club. The pronotum is densely punctured, and the lateral margins and anterior margin are bristled. The elytra have rows of punctures, with the intervals moderately densely covered with tiny bristle-bearing punctures, while the alternating intervals each have a row of distinct setae.
