= Neoserica scutata =

Scientific classification
- Kingdom: Animalia
- Phylum: Arthropoda
- Clade: Pancrustacea
- Class: Insecta
- Order: Coleoptera
- Suborder: Polyphaga
- Infraorder: Scarabaeiformia
- Family: Scarabaeidae
- Genus: Neoserica
- Species: N. scutata

Binomial name
- Neoserica scutata (Moser, 1916)

Synonyms
- Autoserica scutata Moser, 1916

Species of beetle

Neoserica scutata is a species of beetle of the family Scarabaeidae. It is found in the Democratic Republic of the Congo.

== Description ==
Adults reach a length of about 9–10 mm. They are dull, dark brown or blackish-brown above and covered with white, bristle-like scales. The under surface is light brown and the antennae are yellowish-brown. The pronotum is moderately densely punctured, the punctures with fine scales. The elytra have rows of punctures, the intervals extensively covered with scales and the alternating intervals with darker, bare patches, which are bordered anteriorly and posteriorly by larger scales.
