= Neoserica dahomeyensis =

Scientific classification
- Kingdom: Animalia
- Phylum: Arthropoda
- Clade: Pancrustacea
- Class: Insecta
- Order: Coleoptera
- Suborder: Polyphaga
- Infraorder: Scarabaeiformia
- Family: Scarabaeidae
- Genus: Neoserica
- Species: N. dahomeyensis

Binomial name
- Neoserica dahomeyensis (Moser, 1916)

Synonyms
- Autoserica dahomeyensis Moser, 1916

Species of beetle

Neoserica dahomeyensis is a species of beetle of the family Scarabaeidae. It is found in Benin.

== Description ==
Adults reach a length of about 6 mm. They are reddish-brown and dull. The frons is tomentose and finely punctate, with a few setae at the vertex. The pronotum is rather densely covered with fine, minutely bristled punctures and the lateral margins are setate. The elytra have rows of punctures, with the intervals weakly convex and rather sparsely punctate. The punctures have minute setae, with some scattered setae more distinct.
