= Neoserica jokona =

Scientific classification
- Kingdom: Animalia
- Phylum: Arthropoda
- Clade: Pancrustacea
- Class: Insecta
- Order: Coleoptera
- Suborder: Polyphaga
- Infraorder: Scarabaeiformia
- Family: Scarabaeidae
- Genus: Neoserica
- Species: N. jokona

Binomial name
- Neoserica jokona (Moser, 1916)

Synonyms
- Autoserica jokona Moser, 1916

Species of beetle

Neoserica jokona is a species of beetle of the family Scarabaeidae. It is found in Cameroon.

== Description ==
Adults reach a length of about 7–8 mm. They are dull, blackish-brown above and brown below. The frons is dull, finely punctate, and covered with a few setae. The antennae are yellowish-brown, with a lighter club. The pronotum is rather densely covered with mostly short-bristled punctures. The elytra have rows of punctures, with the spaces between them weakly convex and sparsely punctured. The punctures show tiny setae, with larger, lighter setae arranged in rows.
