= Neoserica tessellata =

Scientific classification
- Kingdom: Animalia
- Phylum: Arthropoda
- Class: Insecta
- Order: Coleoptera
- Suborder: Polyphaga
- Infraorder: Scarabaeiformia
- Family: Scarabaeidae
- Genus: Neoserica
- Species: N. tessellata

Binomial name
- Neoserica tessellata (Péringuey, 1904)

Synonyms
- Autoserica tessellata Péringuey, 1904

Species of beetle

Neoserica tessellata is a species of beetle of the family Scarabaeidae. It is found in South Africa (Mpumalanga) and Zimbabwe.

== Description ==
Adults reach a length of about 7.5–9 mm. They are light chestnut, slightly metallic, either lightly infuscate on the head and the central part of the prothorax and with equi-distant fuscous patches forming a tessellation on the plainly convex costae of the elytra, or so much suffused with a fuscous tinge that the tessellation is quite obliterated. The surface has a very short, squamiform hair on each puncture. The antennae are rufescent.
