= Neoserica budjunguana =

Scientific classification
- Kingdom: Animalia
- Phylum: Arthropoda
- Class: Insecta
- Order: Coleoptera
- Suborder: Polyphaga
- Infraorder: Scarabaeiformia
- Family: Scarabaeidae
- Genus: Neoserica
- Species: N. budjunguana

Binomial name
- Neoserica budjunguana (Brenske, 1901)

Synonyms
- Lepiserica budjunguana Brenske, 1901; Autoserica budjunguana

Species of beetle

Neoserica budjunguana is a species of beetle of the family Scarabaeidae. It is found in Uganda.

== Description ==
Adults reach a length of about 7.5 mm. They are ovate, brownish-red and dull, with the intervals of the elytra somewhat darker, striped and opalescent. The pronotum is slightly projecting anteriorly in the middle, almost straight at the sides, becoming equally broader posteriorly, with distinct setae behind the anterior margin and along the lateral margin. The elytra are very finely punctate in the striae, the intervals slightly convex.
