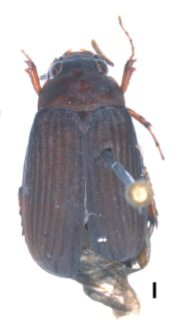

Scientific classification
- Kingdom: Animalia
- Phylum: Arthropoda
- Class: Insecta
- Order: Coleoptera
- Suborder: Polyphaga
- Infraorder: Scarabaeiformia
- Family: Scarabaeidae
- Genus: Neoserica
- Species: N. yanyuan

Binomial name
- Neoserica yanyuan Ahrens, 2023

= Neoserica yanyuan =

Species of beetle

Neoserica yanyuan is a species of beetle of the family Scarabaeidae. It is found in the China (Sichuan).

== Description ==
Adults reach a length of about 9.2 mm. Their body is oblong and reddish brown, with the ventral surface light reddish brown and the antenna yellow, while the dorsal surface is dull and glabrous.

== Etymology ==
The species is named for its type locality, Yanyuan, China.
