= Neoserica multimaculata =

Scientific classification
- Kingdom: Animalia
- Phylum: Arthropoda
- Class: Insecta
- Order: Coleoptera
- Suborder: Polyphaga
- Infraorder: Scarabaeiformia
- Family: Scarabaeidae
- Genus: Neoserica
- Species: N. multimaculata

Binomial name
- Neoserica multimaculata (Brenske, 1899)

Synonyms
- Microserica multimaculata Brenske, 1899; Autoserica multimaculata

Species of beetle

Neoserica multimaculata is a species of beetle of the family Scarabaeidae. It is found in Indonesia (Sumatra) and Malaysia (Sarawak).

== Description ==
Adults reach a length of about 5 mm. They are shortly rounded, dull, yellowish-brown, with black-spotted elytra. The lateral margin of the pronotum is evenly oblique posteriorly, not rounded, and not projecting anteriorly. The setae in the anterior angles are absent. On the elytra, the striae are coarsely and rather deeply punctate, almost in rows.
