= Neoserica montana =

Scientific classification
- Kingdom: Animalia
- Phylum: Arthropoda
- Clade: Pancrustacea
- Class: Insecta
- Order: Coleoptera
- Suborder: Polyphaga
- Infraorder: Scarabaeiformia
- Family: Scarabaeidae
- Genus: Neoserica
- Species: N. montana

Binomial name
- Neoserica montana Moser, 1915

Species of beetle

Neoserica montana is a species of beetle of the family Scarabaeidae. It is found in Malaysia (Sabah).

== Description ==
Adults reach a length of about 8 mm. The upper surface is dark brown, and the underside is somewhat lighter. The frons is sparsely punctate, with scattered setae next to the eyes. The antennae are yellowish-brown. The pronotum is moderately densely punctate and the weakly rounded sides are setate. The punctures of the pronotum, like those of the elytra, have tiny setae. The elytra have rows of punctures, and the weakly convex intervals are widely punctured. Scattered larger setae are found next to the sides of the elytra.
