= Neoserica setifrons =

Scientific classification
- Kingdom: Animalia
- Phylum: Arthropoda
- Clade: Pancrustacea
- Class: Insecta
- Order: Coleoptera
- Suborder: Polyphaga
- Infraorder: Scarabaeiformia
- Family: Scarabaeidae
- Genus: Neoserica
- Species: N. setifrons

Binomial name
- Neoserica setifrons Moser, 1916

Species of beetle

Neoserica setifrons is a species of beetle of the family Scarabaeidae. It is found in Indonesia (Sumatra).

== Description ==
Adults reach a length of about 10.5 mm. They are blackish-brown above and reddish-brown below. The frons, with the exception of the narrow anterior margin behind the indistinct suture, is dull and sparsely bristled. The antennae are yellowish-brown. The pronotum is moderately densely punctate, with the lateral margins setate. The elytra are weakly furrowed and have irregular rows of punctures in the furrows. The spaces between them have extensive punctuation. The punctures are covered with tiny setae.
