= Neoserica subcostata =

Scientific classification
- Kingdom: Animalia
- Phylum: Arthropoda
- Clade: Pancrustacea
- Class: Insecta
- Order: Coleoptera
- Suborder: Polyphaga
- Infraorder: Scarabaeiformia
- Family: Scarabaeidae
- Genus: Neoserica
- Species: N. subcostata

Binomial name
- Neoserica subcostata (Moser, 1918)

Synonyms
- Autoserica subcostata Moser, 1918

Species of beetle

Neoserica subcostata is a species of beetle of the family Scarabaeidae. It is found in Laos.

== Description ==
Adults reach a length of about 5 mm. They are red and dull, with a blackish forehead. The head is moderately densely punctured, with some setae next to the eyes and on the clypeus. The antennae are yellow. The upper surface is fairly densely and finely punctured, on the sides of the pronotum the punctures show tiny setae. The elytra are slightly furrowed, the furrows covered with tiny bristled punctures, while the intervals are almost puncture-free.
