= Neoserica nitidirostris =

Scientific classification
- Kingdom: Animalia
- Phylum: Arthropoda
- Class: Insecta
- Order: Coleoptera
- Suborder: Polyphaga
- Infraorder: Scarabaeiformia
- Family: Scarabaeidae
- Genus: Neoserica
- Species: N. nitidirostris

Binomial name
- Neoserica nitidirostris (Linell, 1896)

Synonyms
- Serica nitidirostris Linell, 1896

Species of beetle

Neoserica nitidirostris is a species of beetle of the family Scarabaeidae. It is found in Somalia.

== Description ==
Adults reach a length of about 8 mm. They are broadly oval, convex, light ferruginous. The antennae re testaceous. The thorax is uniformly convex and surrounded with a narrow black margin and with a small round black spot on each side of the disk. The sides are fimbriate with long red hairs. The elytra are fimbriate at the sides, gradually widened from the base, broadly rounded at the apex, distinctly punctate-striate. The suture is narrowly black.
