= Neoserica balabaca =

Scientific classification
- Kingdom: Animalia
- Phylum: Arthropoda
- Class: Insecta
- Order: Coleoptera
- Suborder: Polyphaga
- Infraorder: Scarabaeiformia
- Family: Scarabaeidae
- Genus: Neoserica
- Species: N. balabaca

Binomial name
- Neoserica balabaca Brenske, 1899

Species of beetle

Neoserica balabaca is a species of beetle of the family Scarabaeidae. It is found in the Philippines (Palawan).

== Description ==
Adults reach a length of about 8 mm. They have an egg-shaped, dark, dull body. The clypeus is broad, short, very densely and finely punctate and weakly margined with very slight elevation. The pronotum is not projecting forward in the middle anteriorly, weakly at the sides, rounded posteriorly with slightly rounded hind angles, very slightly projecting at the posterior margin in front of the scutellum. The elytra are punctate in rows, with the intervals broad, shallow and punctate. The pygidium is somewhat pointed.
