= Neoserica fucatella =

Scientific classification
- Kingdom: Animalia
- Phylum: Arthropoda
- Class: Insecta
- Order: Coleoptera
- Suborder: Polyphaga
- Infraorder: Scarabaeiformia
- Family: Scarabaeidae
- Genus: Neoserica
- Species: N. fucatella

Binomial name
- Neoserica fucatella (Brenske, 1901)

Synonyms
- Lepiserica fucatella Brenske, 1901; Autoserica fucatella

Species of beetle

Neoserica fucatella is a species of beetle of the family Scarabaeidae. It is found in Tanzania.

== Description ==
Adults reach a length of about 9 mm. They have an oblong-oval, very dull body. They are brown underneath, darker above, and scarcely opalescent. The pronotum is dark greenish in the middle and the elytra are punctate in rows, the intervals are sparsely and distinctly punctate, without spots or groups of punctures, with a dense but indistinct group of hairs at the base. The white scale-like setae are arranged in rows.
