= Neoserica lampei =

Scientific classification
- Kingdom: Animalia
- Phylum: Arthropoda
- Clade: Pancrustacea
- Class: Insecta
- Order: Coleoptera
- Suborder: Polyphaga
- Infraorder: Scarabaeiformia
- Family: Scarabaeidae
- Genus: Neoserica
- Species: N. lampei

Binomial name
- Neoserica lampei Moser, 1915

Species of beetle

Neoserica lampei is a species of beetle of the family Scarabaeidae. It is found in Indonesia (Sumatra) and Malaysia.

== Description ==
Adults reach a length of about 7.5–9 mm. They are dull and the upper surface is dark brown or blackish-brown, while the underside is reddish-brown. The frons has some setae in the middle and the antennae are yellowish-brown. The pronotum is moderately densely covered with minutely bristle-bearing punctures. The elytra are covered in irregular rows of punctures in the striations and the weakly curved intervals are only very sparsely punctured. The punctures have minute setae.
