= Neoserica flexiclava =

Scientific classification
- Kingdom: Animalia
- Phylum: Arthropoda
- Class: Insecta
- Order: Coleoptera
- Suborder: Polyphaga
- Infraorder: Scarabaeiformia
- Family: Scarabaeidae
- Genus: Neoserica
- Species: N. flexiclava

Binomial name
- Neoserica flexiclava Ahrens, 2003

Species of beetle

Neoserica flexiclava is a species of beetle of the family Scarabaeidae. It is found in Laos.

== Description ==
Adults reach a length of about 5.8 mm. They have a reddish-brown, elongate-oval body. The underside is dark brown, and the head and pronotum are also dark brown, but partly with a greenish sheen. The dorsal surface is densely covered with light, short hairs, interspersed with long, strong, lighter hairs. The underside is densely covered with hairs.

== Etymology ==
The species name is derived from Latin flexus (meaning bent) and clavus (meaning key) referring to the bent clavus of the antennae.
