= Neoserica yongkangensis =

Scientific classification
- Kingdom: Animalia
- Phylum: Arthropoda
- Class: Insecta
- Order: Coleoptera
- Suborder: Polyphaga
- Infraorder: Scarabaeiformia
- Family: Scarabaeidae
- Genus: Neoserica
- Species: N. yongkangensis

Binomial name
- Neoserica yongkangensis Liu & Ahrens, 2015

Species of beetle

Neoserica yongkangensis is a species of beetle of the family Scarabaeidae. It is found in China (Zhejiang).

== Description ==
Adults reach a length of about 7.3 mm. They have an oval body. The dorsal surface is dull and reddish-brown, while the frons, scutellum and elytral margins are slightly darker with a greenish shine. The ventral surface and legs are dark brown and the antennae are yellowish brown. There are dense and short setae on the entire body and also numerous robust and long, dark, erect setae on the dorsal surface.

== Etymology ==
The species is named after the type locality, Yongkang.
