= Neoserica indistincta =

Scientific classification
- Kingdom: Animalia
- Phylum: Arthropoda
- Class: Insecta
- Order: Coleoptera
- Suborder: Polyphaga
- Infraorder: Scarabaeiformia
- Family: Scarabaeidae
- Genus: Neoserica
- Species: N. indistincta

Binomial name
- Neoserica indistincta Brenske, 1899

Species of beetle

Neoserica indistincta is a species of beetle of the family Scarabaeidae. It is found in Indonesia (Sumatra).

== Description ==
Adults reach a length of about 8 mm. They are dull, reddish-yellow or yellowish-brown and oblong-oval. The clypeus is broad, densely punctate, longitudinally raised in the middle, the anterior margin indented. The frons is somewhat more finely punctate. The pronotum is densely and finely punctate, the marginal setae sparse, the posterior angles not rounded. The elytra are weakly striate, the striae not raised, finely punctate with minute hairs, and with the marginal setae weak.
