= Neoserica politzari =

Scientific classification
- Kingdom: Animalia
- Phylum: Arthropoda
- Class: Insecta
- Order: Coleoptera
- Suborder: Polyphaga
- Infraorder: Scarabaeiformia
- Family: Scarabaeidae
- Genus: Neoserica
- Species: N. politzari

Binomial name
- Neoserica politzari (Frey, 1974)

Synonyms
- Autoserica politzari Frey, 1974

Species of beetle

Neoserica politzari is a species of beetle of the family Scarabaeidae. It is found in Nigeria.

== Description ==
Adults reach a length of about 8–9 mm. The upper and lower surfaces are blackish-brown, dull and slightly tomentose. The antennae are yellow. The frons is somewhat tomentose and very finely and densely, somewhat irregularly punctate. The lateral margins are sparsely fringed with light brown hairs. The pronotum is very densely punctate, slightly more coarsely than the frons, as is the scutellum. The elytra have strong rows of punctures.
