= Neoserica aequalis =

Scientific classification
- Kingdom: Animalia
- Phylum: Arthropoda
- Class: Insecta
- Order: Coleoptera
- Suborder: Polyphaga
- Infraorder: Scarabaeiformia
- Family: Scarabaeidae
- Genus: Neoserica
- Species: N. aequalis

Binomial name
- Neoserica aequalis (Frey, 1970)

Synonyms
- Autoserica aequalis Frey, 1970

Species of beetle

Neoserica aequalis is a species of beetle of the family Scarabaeidae. It is found in Ivory Coast.

== Description ==
Adults reach a length of about 8 mm. The upper surface is blackish-brown, dull and tomentose (except for the clypeus), while the underside is reddish-brown and faintly shiny. Both the upper and under surfaces are glabrous, except for tiny setae in the punctures of the elytra and a few very scattered, coarser setae. The pronotal margin is fringed with pale hairs and the elytra are uniformly marked with striae of punctures.
