= Neoserica lucidifrons =

Scientific classification
- Kingdom: Animalia
- Phylum: Arthropoda
- Class: Insecta
- Order: Coleoptera
- Suborder: Polyphaga
- Infraorder: Scarabaeiformia
- Family: Scarabaeidae
- Genus: Neoserica
- Species: N. lucidifrons

Binomial name
- Neoserica lucidifrons Ahrens, 2003

Species of beetle

Neoserica lucidifrons is a species of beetle of the family Scarabaeidae. It is found in China (Fujian, Guangdong, Guangxi) and Vietnam.

== Description ==
Adults reach a length of about 6.3–6.4 mm. They have a yellowish-brown to light reddish-brown, oval body, the head sometimes darker with a greenish shimmer. They are mostly dull with dense light hairs, interspersed with dense, long, strong, dark hairs. The underside is densely haired.

== Etymology ==
The species name is derived from Latin lucidus (meaning shining) and frons (meaning forehead).
