= Neoserica lydenburgiana =

Scientific classification
- Kingdom: Animalia
- Phylum: Arthropoda
- Class: Insecta
- Order: Coleoptera
- Suborder: Polyphaga
- Infraorder: Scarabaeiformia
- Family: Scarabaeidae
- Genus: Neoserica
- Species: N. lydenburgiana

Binomial name
- Neoserica lydenburgiana (Brenske, 1902)

Synonyms
- Lepiserica lydenburgiana Brenske, 1902; Autoserica lydenburgiana

Species of beetle

Neoserica lydenburgiana is a species of beetle of the family Scarabaeidae. It is found in South Africa (Mpumalanga).

== Description ==
Adults reach a length of about 8 mm. They have an elongate-oval, opaque, uniformly brown body, with a short, hairless clypeus. The elytra are finely but distinctly striate, the deepened striae, in which the punctures are scattered and not seriate, are as broad as the raised interspaces and have solitary bristly hairs.
