= Neoserica togoensis =

Scientific classification
- Kingdom: Animalia
- Phylum: Arthropoda
- Clade: Pancrustacea
- Class: Insecta
- Order: Coleoptera
- Suborder: Polyphaga
- Infraorder: Scarabaeiformia
- Family: Scarabaeidae
- Genus: Neoserica
- Species: N. togoensis

Binomial name
- Neoserica togoensis (Moser, 1916)

Synonyms
- Autoserica togoensis Moser, 1916

Species of beetle

Neoserica togoensis is a species of beetle of the family Scarabaeidae. It is found in Togo.

== Description ==
Adults reach a length of about 8 mm. They are dull, black above and dark brown below. The frons is tomentose and very finely punctate and the antennae are brown. The pronotum is densely covered with extremely minutely bristle-bearing punctures. The elytra have regular rows of punctures, with the intervals flat and irregularly punctate. The punctures have tiny setae, and in some places, slightly more distinct light setae.
