= Neoserica paradoxa =

Scientific classification
- Kingdom: Animalia
- Phylum: Arthropoda
- Class: Insecta
- Order: Coleoptera
- Suborder: Polyphaga
- Infraorder: Scarabaeiformia
- Family: Scarabaeidae
- Genus: Neoserica
- Species: N. paradoxa

Binomial name
- Neoserica paradoxa Ahrens, 2021

Species of beetle

Neoserica paradoxa is a species of beetle of the family Scarabaeidae. It is found in Vietnam.

== Description ==
Adults reach a length of about 7 mm. They have a reddish brown, oval body, the dorsal surface with a greenish shine. There is a large, round, black spot on the elytra before the apex, as well as dense, fine, yellowish setae, mixed with dense, longer, erect, yellow setae.

== Etymology ==
The species name is derived from Greek parádoxos (meaning contrary to expectation) and refers to the particular shape of aedeagus and pronotum, as well as the black elytral spot.
