= Neoserica sharkeyi =

Scientific classification
- Kingdom: Animalia
- Phylum: Arthropoda
- Class: Insecta
- Order: Coleoptera
- Suborder: Polyphaga
- Infraorder: Scarabaeiformia
- Family: Scarabaeidae
- Genus: Neoserica
- Species: N. sharkeyi

Binomial name
- Neoserica sharkeyi Ahrens & Pham, 2021

Species of beetle

Neoserica sharkeyi is a species of beetle of the family Scarabaeidae. It is found in Thailand.

== Description ==
Adults reach a length of about 5.4–7.1 mm. They have a dark brown, oblong body. The ventral sides, labroclypeus and margins of the pronotum are reddish brown and the antennal club is yellowish brown. The dorsal surface is mostly dull and nearly glabrous.

== Etymology ==
The species is named in honour of the initiator of the NSF funded TIGER project (Thailand Inventory Group for Entomological Research), Michael Sharkey.
