= Neoserica javana =

Scientific classification
- Kingdom: Animalia
- Phylum: Arthropoda
- Clade: Pancrustacea
- Class: Insecta
- Order: Coleoptera
- Suborder: Polyphaga
- Infraorder: Scarabaeiformia
- Family: Scarabaeidae
- Genus: Neoserica
- Species: N. javana

Binomial name
- Neoserica javana Moser, 1915

Species of beetle

Neoserica javana is a species of beetle of the family Scarabaeidae. It is found in Indonesia (Java).

== Description ==
Adults reach a length of about 8 mm. They are blackish-brown, and the upper surface is dull, while the underside has a silky sheen. The frons is finely punctured and has individual setae next to the eyes. The antennae are yellowish-brown. The pronotum is moderately densely punctured, and the punctures, like those of the elytra, have extremely tiny setae. The sides of the pronotum are setate. The elytra have rows of punctures and the weakly convex intervals are rather widely punctate.
