= Neoserica lutulosa =

Scientific classification
- Kingdom: Animalia
- Phylum: Arthropoda
- Class: Insecta
- Order: Coleoptera
- Suborder: Polyphaga
- Infraorder: Scarabaeiformia
- Family: Scarabaeidae
- Genus: Neoserica
- Species: N. lutulosa

Binomial name
- Neoserica lutulosa Brenske, 1899

Species of beetle

Neoserica lutulosa is a species of beetle of the family Scarabaeidae. It is found in Indonesia (Java).

== Description ==
Adults reach a length of about 7–10 mm. They are reddish-brown and shiny. The frons has individual setae between fine punctures, which become more scattered towards the vertex. The pronotum is almost straight at the sides, the anterior margin projecting forward in the middle, the posterior angles angular, rather coarsely punctate. The scutellum is short. The elytra are punctate in the striae (almost in rows), the punctures are coarse. The intervals however, are smooth and sparsely punctate.
