= Neoserica nyassica =

Scientific classification
- Kingdom: Animalia
- Phylum: Arthropoda
- Class: Insecta
- Order: Coleoptera
- Suborder: Polyphaga
- Infraorder: Scarabaeiformia
- Family: Scarabaeidae
- Genus: Neoserica
- Species: N. nyassica

Binomial name
- Neoserica nyassica Brenske, 1902

Species of beetle

Neoserica nyassica is a species of beetle of the family Scarabaeidae. It is found in Malawi.

== Description ==
Adults reach a length of about 6.5–7 mm. They are somewhat elongate-oval, dull and reddish yellowish-brown with an opalescent luster. The pronotum is almost straight laterally with distinct marginal setae, also anteriorly. The posterior corners are rounded. The scutellum is narrow, the apex slightly rounded, with irregular punctures beside it. The narrow, slightly convex intervals are widely punctate and the marginal setae are dense and there are very faint, yellow setae laterally.
