= Neoserica benguellana =

Scientific classification
- Kingdom: Animalia
- Phylum: Arthropoda
- Clade: Pancrustacea
- Class: Insecta
- Order: Coleoptera
- Suborder: Polyphaga
- Infraorder: Scarabaeiformia
- Family: Scarabaeidae
- Genus: Neoserica
- Species: N. benguellana

Binomial name
- Neoserica benguellana (Moser, 1918)

Synonyms
- Autoserica benguellana Moser, 1918

Species of beetle

Neoserica benguellana is a species of beetle of the family Scarabaeidae. It is found in Angola.

== Description ==
Adults reach a length of about 9 mm. They are reddish-brown and dull. The frons is moderately densely punctured and the antennae are reddish-brown with a yellow club. The pronotum is quite densely covered with extremely minutely bristle-bearing punctures and the elytra have rows of punctures, with the intervals moderately densely punctured (the punctures mostly with minute, but also some longer setae).
