= Neoserica ikuthana =

Scientific classification
- Kingdom: Animalia
- Phylum: Arthropoda
- Class: Insecta
- Order: Coleoptera
- Suborder: Polyphaga
- Infraorder: Scarabaeiformia
- Family: Scarabaeidae
- Genus: Neoserica
- Species: N. ikuthana

Binomial name
- Neoserica ikuthana Brenske, 1902

Species of beetle

Neoserica ikuthana is a species of beetle of the family Scarabaeidae. It is found in Kenya.

== Description ==
Adults reach a length of about 6.8 mm. They are yellowish-red, silky dull, with a faint opalescent sheen, and shiny underneath. The pronotum is slightly projecting in the middle of the anterior margin, curved at the sides before the posterior angles, these slightly projecting and rounded, the marginal setae are not strong and the surface is finely punctate. The scutellum is elongate and pointed. The elytra are punctate in rows, the intervals slightly raised and sparsely punctate.
