= Neoserica preangerensis =

Scientific classification
- Kingdom: Animalia
- Phylum: Arthropoda
- Clade: Pancrustacea
- Class: Insecta
- Order: Coleoptera
- Suborder: Polyphaga
- Infraorder: Scarabaeiformia
- Family: Scarabaeidae
- Genus: Neoserica
- Species: N. preangerensis

Binomial name
- Neoserica preangerensis Moser, 1916

Species of beetle

Neoserica preangerensis is a species of beetle of the family Scarabaeidae. It is found in Indonesia (Java).

== Description ==
Adults reach a length of about 9 mm. They are brown or blackish-brown above and brown below. The upper surface is very heavily tomentose, making the punctation difficult to see. The frons is dull and finely punctate and the antennae are yellowish-brown. Due to the tomentose covering, the punctation on the pronotum is barely visible. The elytra have rows of punctures, with the intervals sparsely punctate. The punctures are covered with tiny setae.
