= Neoserica iridipes =

Scientific classification
- Kingdom: Animalia
- Phylum: Arthropoda
- Clade: Pancrustacea
- Class: Insecta
- Order: Coleoptera
- Suborder: Polyphaga
- Infraorder: Scarabaeiformia
- Family: Scarabaeidae
- Genus: Neoserica
- Species: N. iridipes

Binomial name
- Neoserica iridipes (Moser, 1916)

Synonyms
- Autoserica iridipes Moser, 1916

Species of beetle

Neoserica iridipes is a species of beetle of the family Scarabaeidae. It is found in the Democratic Republic of the Congo.

== Description ==
Adults reach a length of about 10 mm. They are dull and blackish-brown above, with the frons and pronotum shimmering greenish. The underside is brown. The elytra have a row of punctures, with the intervals blackish-brown and very sparsely punctured. All punctures have extremely minute setae and there are isolated larger setae arranged in rows on the alternating intervals.
