= Neoserica monticola =

Scientific classification
- Kingdom: Animalia
- Phylum: Arthropoda
- Clade: Pancrustacea
- Class: Insecta
- Order: Coleoptera
- Suborder: Polyphaga
- Infraorder: Scarabaeiformia
- Family: Scarabaeidae
- Genus: Neoserica
- Species: N. monticola

Binomial name
- Neoserica monticola (Moser, 1915)

Synonyms
- Autoserica monticola Moser, 1915

Species of beetle

Neoserica monticola is a species of beetle of the family Scarabaeidae. It is found in Malaysia (Sabah).

== Description ==
Adults reach a length of about 8.5 mm. They are black and dull, with a faint silky sheen above, and blackish-brown below. The head is densely covered with large punctures and sparsely setate. The antennae are yellowish-brown. The pronotum has dense punctation and the elytra are shallowly furrowed and irregularly punctate in the furrows, while the intervals are almost unpunctate.
