= Neoserica usambarana =

Scientific classification
- Kingdom: Animalia
- Phylum: Arthropoda
- Clade: Pancrustacea
- Class: Insecta
- Order: Coleoptera
- Suborder: Polyphaga
- Infraorder: Scarabaeiformia
- Family: Scarabaeidae
- Genus: Neoserica
- Species: N. usambarana

Binomial name
- Neoserica usambarana (Moser, 1916)

Synonyms
- Autoserica usambarana Moser, 1916

Species of beetle

Neoserica usambarana is a species of beetle of the family Scarabaeidae. It is found in Tanzania.

== Description ==
Adults reach a length of about 7.5 mm. They are reddish-brown and dull. The frons is tomentose, with individual setae behind the suture. The pronotum is moderately densely punctate, with setate lateral margins. The elytra have rows of punctures, with the intervals rather sparsely punctate. The punctures are minutely setate and somewhat more distinct setae are arranged in rows.
