= Neoserica (Autoserica) senegalensis =

Scientific classification
- Kingdom: Animalia
- Phylum: Arthropoda
- Class: Insecta
- Order: Coleoptera
- Suborder: Polyphaga
- Infraorder: Scarabaeiformia
- Family: Scarabaeidae
- Genus: Neoserica
- Species: N. senegalensis

Binomial name
- Neoserica senegalensis (Frey, 1968)

Synonyms
- Autoserica senegalensis Frey, 1968

Species of beetle

Neoserica senegalensis is a species of beetle of the family Scarabaeidae. It is found in Senegal.

== Description ==
Adults reach a length of about 5-5.5 mm. The upper and lower surfaces are ochre-yellow and shiny, with the head slightly darker. The sides of the pronotum and elytra are weakly fringed and there are some setae on the margin of the elytra and at the apex of the pygidium. The pronotum is finely and moderately densely punctate. The elytra have distinct punctate striae.
