= Neoserica fucata =

Scientific classification
- Kingdom: Animalia
- Phylum: Arthropoda
- Class: Insecta
- Order: Coleoptera
- Suborder: Polyphaga
- Infraorder: Scarabaeiformia
- Family: Scarabaeidae
- Genus: Neoserica
- Species: N. fucata

Binomial name
- Neoserica fucata (Brenske, 1901)

Synonyms
- Lepiserica fucata Brenske, 1901; Autoserica fucata

Species of beetle

Neoserica fucata is a species of beetle of the family Scarabaeidae. It is found in Tanzania.

== Description ==
Adults reach a length of about 9 mm. They have an oblong-oval, dark and dull body. The frons and the vertex have setae behind the suture. The pronotum is only slightly rounded on the sides, the setae are weak at the margins. The elytra are densely punctured in rows on the striae, while the intervals are only sparsely punctate. The white scale-like setae are distinct. The underside is less densely setate.
