= Neoserica congoensis =

Scientific classification
- Kingdom: Animalia
- Phylum: Arthropoda
- Clade: Pancrustacea
- Class: Insecta
- Order: Coleoptera
- Suborder: Polyphaga
- Infraorder: Scarabaeiformia
- Family: Scarabaeidae
- Genus: Neoserica
- Species: N. congoensis

Binomial name
- Neoserica congoensis (Moser, 1916)

Synonyms
- Autoserica congoensis Moser, 1916

Species of beetle

Neoserica congoensis is a species of beetle of the family Scarabaeidae. It is found in the Democratic Republic of the Congo.

== Description ==
Adults reach a length of about 8 mm. The upper surface is black and dull, with a slight silky sheen. The underside is reddish-brown. The antennae are yellowish-brown. The pronotum is quite densely punctured with setae on the lateral margins and the anterior margin. The elytra have rows of punctures, the spaces between them extensively covered with punctures.
