= Neoserica moffartsi =

Scientific classification
- Kingdom: Animalia
- Phylum: Arthropoda
- Class: Insecta
- Order: Coleoptera
- Suborder: Polyphaga
- Infraorder: Scarabaeiformia
- Family: Scarabaeidae
- Genus: Neoserica
- Species: N. moffartsi

Binomial name
- Neoserica moffartsi Brenske, 1900

Species of beetle

Neoserica moffartsi is a species of beetle of the family Scarabaeidae. It is found in Indonesia (Sumatra).

== Description ==
Adults reach a length of about 7 mm. They are dull brown, almost velvety, and the scale-like hairs on the elytra are very indistinct, absent, or present only on the sides. The frons is broad and the eyes are large. The pronotum is not projecting forward in the middle at the anterior margin and the sides are very slightly rounded, only slightly wider posteriorly. The weakly opalescent elytra are coarsely punctate in the striae and the intervals are narrow.
