= Neoserica annectens =

Scientific classification
- Kingdom: Animalia
- Phylum: Arthropoda
- Class: Insecta
- Order: Coleoptera
- Suborder: Polyphaga
- Infraorder: Scarabaeiformia
- Family: Scarabaeidae
- Genus: Neoserica
- Species: N. annectens

Binomial name
- Neoserica annectens (Péringuey, 1904)

Synonyms
- Autoserica annectens Péringuey, 1904

Species of beetle

Neoserica annectens is a species of beetle of the family Scarabaeidae. It is found in Zimbabwe.

== Description ==
Adults reach a length of about 6.25–6.50 mm. They are fuscous or dark chestnut-brown, with a faint greenish-bronze tinge on the frontal part of the head, and on the discoidal part of the prothorax, it has no sericeous sheen, the under side is lighter chestnut-brown than the upper, and so are the legs, the antennal club is flavous in males, while it is reddish-brown in females.
