= Neoserica flavorufa =

Scientific classification
- Kingdom: Animalia
- Phylum: Arthropoda
- Clade: Pancrustacea
- Class: Insecta
- Order: Coleoptera
- Suborder: Polyphaga
- Infraorder: Scarabaeiformia
- Family: Scarabaeidae
- Genus: Neoserica
- Species: N. flavorufa

Binomial name
- Neoserica flavorufa Moser, 1915

Species of beetle

Neoserica flavorufa is a species of beetle of the family Scarabaeidae. It is found in Indonesia (Kalimantan).

== Description ==
Adults reach a length of about 8.5 mm. They are yellowish-brown and shiny. The head is widely covered with faint punctures, with a few setae beside the eyes. The pronotum is moderately densely punctured and the elytra are weakly furrowed, the furrows with irregular rows of punctures. The intervals have only scattered punctures and appear, particularly towards the sides of the elytra, as flat, smooth ridges.
