= Neoserica propria =

Scientific classification
- Kingdom: Animalia
- Phylum: Arthropoda
- Class: Insecta
- Order: Coleoptera
- Suborder: Polyphaga
- Infraorder: Scarabaeiformia
- Family: Scarabaeidae
- Genus: Neoserica
- Species: N. propria

Binomial name
- Neoserica propria Brenske, 1899

Species of beetle

Neoserica propria is a species of beetle of the family Scarabaeidae. It is found in Indonesia (Flores).

== Description ==
Adults reach a length of about 10 mm. They are very densely tomentose, brown underneath and darker above. The pronotum is projecting forward in the middle anteriorly, the sides slightly rounded, the hind angles blunt, slightly rounded, projecting distinctly in front of the scutellum. The elytra are punctate in rows, with punctures next to them, the intervals somewhat raised and smooth, the sutural stria continuing around the apex. The pygidium is pointed with a faint longitudinal stria.
