= Neoserica semipubescens =

Scientific classification
- Kingdom: Animalia
- Phylum: Arthropoda
- Class: Insecta
- Order: Coleoptera
- Suborder: Polyphaga
- Infraorder: Scarabaeiformia
- Family: Scarabaeidae
- Genus: Neoserica
- Species: N. semipubescens

Binomial name
- Neoserica semipubescens Ahrens, 2003

Species of beetle

Neoserica semipubescens is a species of beetle of the family Scarabaeidae. It is found in Thailand.

== Description ==
Adults reach a length of about 6 mm. They have a reddish-brown, elongate-oval body. The underside is dark brown, and the head and pronotum are also dark brown, but partly with a greenish sheen. The dorsal surface is densely covered with light, short hairs, interspersed with long, strong, lighter hairs. The underside is densely covered with hairs.

== Etymology ==
The species name is derived from Latin semi (meaning half) and pubescens (meaning hairy).
