= Neoserica sedonensis =

Scientific classification
- Kingdom: Animalia
- Phylum: Arthropoda
- Class: Insecta
- Order: Coleoptera
- Suborder: Polyphaga
- Infraorder: Scarabaeiformia
- Family: Scarabaeidae
- Genus: Neoserica
- Species: N. sedonensis

Binomial name
- Neoserica sedonensis (Frey, 1972)

Synonyms
- Autoserica sedonensis Frey, 1972

Species of beetle

Neoserica sedonensis is a species of beetle of the family Scarabaeidae. It is found in Laos.

== Description ==
Adults reach a length of about 7.5–8 mm. The upper and lower surfaces are brown and dull, while the clypeus and legs are shiny. The ventral segments and antennae are light brown and there are some light brown setae on the eye margins and on the anterior margin of the pronotum. The pronotum and elytral margins are ciliated. The thorax and pygidium have very long, scattered light brown setae.
