= Neoserica rungweensis =

Scientific classification
- Kingdom: Animalia
- Phylum: Arthropoda
- Class: Insecta
- Order: Coleoptera
- Suborder: Polyphaga
- Infraorder: Scarabaeiformia
- Family: Scarabaeidae
- Genus: Neoserica
- Species: N. rungweensis

Binomial name
- Neoserica rungweensis (Frey, 1974)

Synonyms
- Autoserica rungweensis Frey, 1974

Species of beetle

Neoserica rungweensis is a species of beetle of the family Scarabaeidae. It is found in Tanzania.

== Description ==
Adults reach a length of about 9–10 mm. The underside is reddish-brown, dull and tomentose. The antennae are somewhat lighter brown. Both the upper and lower surfaces are glabrous. The pronotum is moderately densely, irregularly, and very shallowly punctured, with minute setae in the punctures. The elytra are very sparsely and indistinctly punctured in rows.
