= Neoserica plebeja =

Scientific classification
- Kingdom: Animalia
- Phylum: Arthropoda
- Clade: Pancrustacea
- Class: Insecta
- Order: Coleoptera
- Suborder: Polyphaga
- Infraorder: Scarabaeiformia
- Family: Scarabaeidae
- Genus: Neoserica
- Species: N. plebeja

Binomial name
- Neoserica plebeja (Moser, 1916)

Synonyms
- Autoserica plebeja Moser, 1916

Species of beetle

Neoserica plebeja is a species of beetle of the family Scarabaeidae. It is found in the Democratic Republic of the Congo.

== Description ==
Adults reach a length of about 8 mm. They are brown (darker above and lighter below) and thinly tomentose. The pronotum is moderately densely punctate, with the punctures extremely finely setate. The lateral margins have longer setae. The elytra have rows of punctures, with very minute setae, although some individual setae are somewhat more distinct.
