= Neoserica grandis =

Scientific classification
- Kingdom: Animalia
- Phylum: Arthropoda
- Class: Insecta
- Order: Coleoptera
- Suborder: Polyphaga
- Infraorder: Scarabaeiformia
- Family: Scarabaeidae
- Genus: Neoserica
- Species: N. grandis

Binomial name
- Neoserica grandis (Brenske, 1894)

Synonyms
- Serica grandis Brenske, 1894

Species of beetle

Neoserica grandis is a species of beetle of the family Scarabaeidae. It is found in Indonesia (Java).

== Description ==
Adults reach a length of about 13 mm. They are almost golden-red underneath with a dull sheen, while they are dark purplish-shimmering above. The frons is dull and finely punctured. The lateral margin of the thorax is setate. The punctures are widely spaced and have extremely short hairs, as do the scutellum and elytra. These are punctured and striate with broad, almost flat, widely punctured intervals.
