= Neoserica panchmariensis =

Scientific classification
- Kingdom: Animalia
- Phylum: Arthropoda
- Class: Insecta
- Order: Coleoptera
- Suborder: Polyphaga
- Infraorder: Scarabaeiformia
- Family: Scarabaeidae
- Genus: Neoserica
- Species: N. panchmariensis

Binomial name
- Neoserica panchmariensis Bhunia, Gupta, Chandra & Ahrens, 2022

Species of beetle

Neoserica panchmariensis is a species of beetle of the family Scarabaeidae. It is found in India (Madhya Pradesh).

== Description ==
Adults reach a length of about 6.1–6.2 mm. They have a shiny, oblong-oval body. The dorsal surface is reddish brown and shiny, while the ventral surface is yellowish brown and dull. The head is moderately shiny and the surface is almost glabrous, except for a few single setae.

== Etymology ==
The species is named after the type locality, Panchmari.
