= Neoserica brevicrus =

Scientific classification
- Kingdom: Animalia
- Phylum: Arthropoda
- Clade: Pancrustacea
- Class: Insecta
- Order: Coleoptera
- Suborder: Polyphaga
- Infraorder: Scarabaeiformia
- Family: Scarabaeidae
- Genus: Neoserica
- Species: N. brevicrus

Binomial name
- Neoserica brevicrus Moser, 1915

Species of beetle

Neoserica brevicrus is a species of beetle of the family Scarabaeidae. It is found in Indonesia (Sumatra).

== Description ==
Adults reach a length of about 7.5 mm. They are dull, blackish-brown above, and lighter underneath. The head is moderately densely punctate and the antennae are yellowish-brown. The pronotum is covered with moderately dense punctation and the lateral margins are setose. The elytra have rows of punctures, with the intervals weakly convex and sparsely punctate. The punctures are minutely setose.
