= Neoserica endroedii =

Scientific classification
- Kingdom: Animalia
- Phylum: Arthropoda
- Class: Insecta
- Order: Coleoptera
- Suborder: Polyphaga
- Infraorder: Scarabaeiformia
- Family: Scarabaeidae
- Genus: Neoserica
- Species: N. endroedii

Binomial name
- Neoserica endroedii (Frey, 1974)

Synonyms
- Autoserica (Neoserica) endroedii Frey, 1974

Species of beetle

Neoserica endroedii is a species of beetle of the family Scarabaeidae. It is found in Ghana.

== Description ==
Adults reach a length of about 6 mm. The upper and lower surfaces are reddish-brown and dull. The frons is somewhat darker and more tomentose than the pronotum and elytra. The upper side is glabrous. The pronotum is moderately densely and shallowly punctate, the punctures with minute setae. The elytra have rows of punctures. The antennae are light brown.
