= Neoserica parajingangshanica =

Scientific classification
- Kingdom: Animalia
- Phylum: Arthropoda
- Class: Insecta
- Order: Coleoptera
- Suborder: Polyphaga
- Infraorder: Scarabaeiformia
- Family: Scarabaeidae
- Genus: Neoserica
- Species: N. parajingangshanica

Binomial name
- Neoserica parajingangshanica Liu, Ahrens, Li & Yang, 2024

Species of beetle

Neoserica parajingangshanica is a species of beetle of the family Scarabaeidae. It is found in China (Guangdong).

== Description ==
Adults reach a length of about 6.3–7.5 mm. They have a dark reddish brown, oval body. The dorsal surface is partly shining greenish, mostly dull and with some short and some dense and long setae.

== Etymology ==
The species name is derived from Greek para- (meaning false) and the species name jingangshanica and refers to its similarity to Neoserica jingangshanica.
