= Neoserica setipes =

Scientific classification
- Kingdom: Animalia
- Phylum: Arthropoda
- Clade: Pancrustacea
- Class: Insecta
- Order: Coleoptera
- Suborder: Polyphaga
- Infraorder: Scarabaeiformia
- Family: Scarabaeidae
- Genus: Neoserica
- Species: N. setipes

Binomial name
- Neoserica setipes (Moser, 1918)

Synonyms
- Autoserica setipes Moser, 1918

Species of beetle

Neoserica setipes is a species of beetle of the family Scarabaeidae. It is found in Angola.

== Description ==
Adults reach a length of about 9–10 mm. They are reddish-brown and dull. The frons is tomentose and finely punctate and the antennae are yellowish-red with a yellow club. The pronotum is rather densely punctate and the elytra are moderately densely covered with minutely bristled punctures. At the base of the elytra, the bristles of the punctures are more distinct.
