= Neoserica inspergata =

Scientific classification
- Kingdom: Animalia
- Phylum: Arthropoda
- Class: Insecta
- Order: Coleoptera
- Suborder: Polyphaga
- Infraorder: Scarabaeiformia
- Family: Scarabaeidae
- Genus: Neoserica
- Species: N. inspergata

Binomial name
- Neoserica inspergata Ahrens & Fabrizi, 2009

Species of beetle

Neoserica inspergata is a species of beetle of the family Scarabaeidae. It is found in north-eastern India (western Arunachal Pradesh).

== Description ==
Adults reach a length of about 11.2-11.9 mm. They have a dark brown, oval body, with a greenish shine dorsally. The punctures and legs are reddish brown. The dorsal surface is weakly shining and sparsely setose.

== Etymology ==
The species name is derived from Latin inspergatus (meaning splashed) and refers to the reddish punctures of the greenish body surface.
