= Neoserica phuruaensis =

Scientific classification
- Kingdom: Animalia
- Phylum: Arthropoda
- Class: Insecta
- Order: Coleoptera
- Suborder: Polyphaga
- Infraorder: Scarabaeiformia
- Family: Scarabaeidae
- Genus: Neoserica
- Species: N. phuruaensis

Binomial name
- Neoserica phuruaensis Ahrens, 2003

Species of beetle

Neoserica phuruaensis is a species of beetle of the family Scarabaeidae. It is found in Thailand.

== Description ==
Adults reach a length of about 5.4–5.7 mm. They have a reddish-brown to dark brown, elongate-oval body. The underside is dark brown, and the upperside partly has a greenish sheen. The dorsal surface is densely covered with light, short hairs, interspersed with long, strong, lighter hairs. The underside is densely covered with hairs.

== Etymology ==
The species is named after the type locality, Phu Rua.
