= Neoserica phuphanensis =

Scientific classification
- Kingdom: Animalia
- Phylum: Arthropoda
- Class: Insecta
- Order: Coleoptera
- Suborder: Polyphaga
- Infraorder: Scarabaeiformia
- Family: Scarabaeidae
- Genus: Neoserica
- Species: N. phuphanensis

Binomial name
- Neoserica phuphanensis Ahrens, 2003

Species of beetle

Neoserica phuphanensis is a species of beetle of the family Scarabaeidae. It is found in Laos.

== Description ==
Adults reach a length of about 6–7.4 mm. They have a yellowish-brown to light reddish-brown, oval body, with the forehead darker. The upper side is weakly and iridescently shiny. The dorsal surface is densely covered with light, short hairs, interspersed with long, strong, lighter hairs. The underside is densely covered with hairs.

== Etymology ==
The species is named after the type locality, Phu Phan.
