= Neoserica ukereweana =

Scientific classification
- Kingdom: Animalia
- Phylum: Arthropoda
- Clade: Pancrustacea
- Class: Insecta
- Order: Coleoptera
- Suborder: Polyphaga
- Infraorder: Scarabaeiformia
- Family: Scarabaeidae
- Genus: Neoserica
- Species: N. ukereweana

Binomial name
- Neoserica ukereweana Moser, 1920

Species of beetle

Neoserica ukereweana is a species of beetle of the family Scarabaeidae. It is found in Tanzania.

== Description ==
Adults reach a length of about 8.5 mm. They are rufous-brown and opaque. The frons is subtly punctate with a few setae and the antennae are reddish-yellow. The pronotum is setose on the sides and the surface is finely punctate. The elytra are seriate-punctate, with the interstices slightly convex and moderately densely punctate, as well as with a few setae, some of which are slightly larger.
