= Neoserica brevicollis =

Scientific classification
- Kingdom: Animalia
- Phylum: Arthropoda
- Clade: Pancrustacea
- Class: Insecta
- Order: Coleoptera
- Suborder: Polyphaga
- Infraorder: Scarabaeiformia
- Family: Scarabaeidae
- Genus: Neoserica
- Species: N. brevicollis

Binomial name
- Neoserica brevicollis Moser, 1922

Species of beetle

Neoserica brevicollis is a species of beetle of the family Scarabaeidae. It is found in Indonesia (Sumatra).

== Description ==
Adults reach a length of about 9 mm. They have an oblong-oval body. They are rufous above, and testaceous below. The frons is indistinctly punctate. The pronotum is quite densely punctate, with minute setae in the punctures. The elytra are slightly sulcate, moderately densely punctate, and covered with minute setose punctures. The sides of the elytra are ciliated.
