= Neoserica taibaiensis =

Scientific classification
- Kingdom: Animalia
- Phylum: Arthropoda
- Class: Insecta
- Order: Coleoptera
- Suborder: Polyphaga
- Infraorder: Scarabaeiformia
- Family: Scarabaeidae
- Genus: Neoserica
- Species: N. taibaiensis

Binomial name
- Neoserica taibaiensis Liu & Ahrens, 2015

Species of beetle

Neoserica taibaiensis is a species of beetle of the family Scarabaeidae. It is found in China (Shaanxi).

== Description ==
Adults reach a length of about 6.3 mm. They have a dark brown, oval body. The antennae are yellowish brown and the elytra have irregular reddish spots. The legs and the base of the pronotum are reddish brown. The dorsal surface has dense, short, yellow setae, while the head and pronotum have long erect setae.

== Etymology ==
The species is named after the type locality, Taibai.
