= Neoserica surigaoana =

Scientific classification
- Kingdom: Animalia
- Phylum: Arthropoda
- Clade: Pancrustacea
- Class: Insecta
- Order: Coleoptera
- Suborder: Polyphaga
- Infraorder: Scarabaeiformia
- Family: Scarabaeidae
- Genus: Neoserica
- Species: N. surigaoana

Binomial name
- Neoserica surigaoana Moser, 1917

Species of beetle

Neoserica surigaoana is a species of beetle of the family Scarabaeidae. It is found in the Philippines (Mindanao).

== Description ==
Adults reach a length of about 7 mm. They are brown and dull. The head is sparsely punctate. The pronotum is quite densely covered with minutely setate punctures and the lateral margin and the lateral margins are strongly setate. The elytra are slightly longitudinally furrowed and the furrows are densely, and the intervals sparsely punctate. All punctures have minute setae.
