= Neoserica nitidior =

Scientific classification
- Kingdom: Animalia
- Phylum: Arthropoda
- Class: Insecta
- Order: Coleoptera
- Suborder: Polyphaga
- Infraorder: Scarabaeiformia
- Family: Scarabaeidae
- Genus: Neoserica
- Species: N. nitidior

Binomial name
- Neoserica nitidior (Frey, 1972)

Synonyms
- Autoserica nitidior Frey, 1972

Species of beetle

Neoserica nitidior is a species of beetle of the family Scarabaeidae. It is found in Vietnam.

== Description ==
Adults reach a length of about 6–7 mm. The upper and lower surfaces are reddish-brown and glossy, while the antennae are light brown. There are a few erect, light-coloured setae at the eye margins, and a few scattered setae at the margins of the pronotum, elytra, and the lower margin of the pygidium. The rest of the upper surface is glabrous.
