= Neoserica confinis =

Scientific classification
- Kingdom: Animalia
- Phylum: Arthropoda
- Class: Insecta
- Order: Coleoptera
- Suborder: Polyphaga
- Infraorder: Scarabaeiformia
- Family: Scarabaeidae
- Genus: Neoserica
- Species: N. confinis

Binomial name
- Neoserica confinis (Burmeister, 1855)

Synonyms
- Serica confinis Burmeister, 1855; Autoserica confinis

Species of beetle

Neoserica confinis is a species of beetle of the family Scarabaeidae. It is found in South Africa (Eastern Cape).

== Description ==
They have a dark purple, elongate-oval body. They red-brown above, but paler underneath and are opaque with a very slight silky sheen. The clypeus is punctate and shiny, and the vertex, prothorax, and elytra have scattered punctures, in each puncture a little bristle. The legs have a brighter silky sheen.
