= Neoserica hirokazui =

Scientific classification
- Kingdom: Animalia
- Phylum: Arthropoda
- Class: Insecta
- Order: Coleoptera
- Suborder: Polyphaga
- Infraorder: Scarabaeiformia
- Family: Scarabaeidae
- Genus: Neoserica
- Species: N. hirokazui

Binomial name
- Neoserica hirokazui Ahrens, 2003

Species of beetle

Neoserica hirokazui is a species of beetle of the family Scarabaeidae. It is found in Vietnam.

== Description ==
Adults reach a length of about 7.6–8.4 mm. They have a dark reddish brown, oval body. Part of the upper surface has a greenish shimmer. They are mostly dull with dense light hairs, interspersed with dense, long, strong, dark hairs. The underside is densely haired.

== Etymology ==
The species is dedicated to the Scarabaeoidea researcher Hirokazu Kobayashi.
