= Neoserica ovata =

Scientific classification
- Kingdom: Animalia
- Phylum: Arthropoda
- Clade: Pancrustacea
- Class: Insecta
- Order: Coleoptera
- Suborder: Polyphaga
- Infraorder: Scarabaeiformia
- Family: Scarabaeidae
- Genus: Neoserica
- Species: N. ovata

Binomial name
- Neoserica ovata Moser, 1915

Species of beetle

Neoserica ovata is a species of beetle of the family Scarabaeidae. It is found in Malaysia (Sabah).

== Description ==
Adults reach a length of about 7 mm. They are dull and blackish-brown above, but lighter below. The frons is rather sparsely punctate and the antennae are yellowish-brown. The pronotum is moderately densely covered with minutely bristle-bearing punctures. The elytra are slightly furrowed and quite extensive and irregularly punctured. The punctures are covered with tiny setae.
