= Neoserica nitidula =

Scientific classification
- Kingdom: Animalia
- Phylum: Arthropoda
- Class: Insecta
- Order: Coleoptera
- Suborder: Polyphaga
- Infraorder: Scarabaeiformia
- Family: Scarabaeidae
- Genus: Neoserica
- Species: N. nitidula

Binomial name
- Neoserica nitidula Frey, 1972

Species of beetle

Neoserica nitidula is a species of beetle of the family Scarabaeidae. It is found in Vietnam.

== Description ==
Adults reach a length of about 5 mm. The upper and lower surfaces are light reddish-brown and quite glossy. The antennae are yellow. There are some erect setae on the head and very sparse cilia on the elytra and pronotum, which may be entirely absent. The rest of the upper surface is glabrous. The margins of the pygidium and ventral segments have a row of setae, and there are some light brown setae on the middle of the thorax.
