= Neoserica samuelsoni =

Scientific classification
- Kingdom: Animalia
- Phylum: Arthropoda
- Class: Insecta
- Order: Coleoptera
- Suborder: Polyphaga
- Infraorder: Scarabaeiformia
- Family: Scarabaeidae
- Genus: Neoserica
- Species: N. samuelsoni

Binomial name
- Neoserica samuelsoni Ahrens, 2022

Species of beetle

Neoserica samuelsoni is a species of beetle of the family Scarabaeidae. It is found in Laos.

== Description ==
Adults reach a length of about 4.6 mm. They have a brown, short-oval body. The antennal club and legs are yellow and the pronotum and a large spot on the disc of the elytra are reddish brown. The dorsal surface is mostly dull and nearly glabrous.

== Etymology ==
The species is named after the former curator of the beetle collection at the Bishop Museum, G.A. Samuelson.
