= Neoserica shibingensis =

Scientific classification
- Kingdom: Animalia
- Phylum: Arthropoda
- Class: Insecta
- Order: Coleoptera
- Suborder: Polyphaga
- Infraorder: Scarabaeiformia
- Family: Scarabaeidae
- Genus: Neoserica
- Species: N. shibingensis

Binomial name
- Neoserica shibingensis Ahrens, 2003

Species of beetle

Neoserica shibingensis is a species of beetle of the family Scarabaeidae. It is found in China (Guizhou, Hubei, Shaanxi).

== Description ==
Adults reach a length of about 8.0–8.1 mm. They have a black to dark reddish brown, oval body. Part of the upper surface has a greenish shimmer. They are mostly dull with dense light hairs, interspersed with dense, long, strong, dark hairs. The underside is densely haired.

== Etymology ==
The species is named after the type locality, Shibing.
