= Neoserica nangana =

Scientific classification
- Kingdom: Animalia
- Phylum: Arthropoda
- Class: Insecta
- Order: Coleoptera
- Suborder: Polyphaga
- Infraorder: Scarabaeiformia
- Family: Scarabaeidae
- Genus: Neoserica
- Species: N. nangana

Binomial name
- Neoserica nangana (Frey, 1968)

Synonyms
- Autoserica nangana Frey, 1968

Species of beetle

Neoserica nangana is a species of beetle of the family Scarabaeidae. It is found in Cameroon.

== Description ==
Adults reach a length of about 8–9 mm. The upper and lower surfaces are dark reddish-brown, with the pygidium and antennae light brown, and the clypeus shiny. The pronotum, scutellum and elytra are dull. The lateral and anterior margin of the pronotum as well as the lateral margin of the elytra are weakly ciliately light brown.
