= Neoserica nasuta =

Scientific classification
- Kingdom: Animalia
- Phylum: Arthropoda
- Class: Insecta
- Order: Coleoptera
- Suborder: Polyphaga
- Infraorder: Scarabaeiformia
- Family: Scarabaeidae
- Genus: Neoserica
- Species: N. nasuta

Binomial name
- Neoserica nasuta (Frey, 1968)

Synonyms
- Autoserica nasuta Frey, 1968

Species of beetle

Neoserica nasuta is a species of beetle of the family Scarabaeidae. It is found in the Democratic Republic of the Congo.

== Description ==
Adults reach a length of about 8 mm. The upper and lower surfaces are dark brown and shiny, with the elytra somewhat opalescent. The antennae are yellowish-brown. The head is glabrous, while the pronotum and elytra have light brown cilia. The punctures on the pronotum and elytra have minute setae.
