= Neoserica malaccana =

Scientific classification
- Kingdom: Animalia
- Phylum: Arthropoda
- Clade: Pancrustacea
- Class: Insecta
- Order: Coleoptera
- Suborder: Polyphaga
- Infraorder: Scarabaeiformia
- Family: Scarabaeidae
- Genus: Neoserica
- Species: N. malaccana

Binomial name
- Neoserica malaccana Moser, 1921

Species of beetle

Neoserica malaccana is a species of beetle of the family Scarabaeidae. It is found in Malaysia (Malacca).

== Description ==
Adults reach a length of about 6-6.5 mm. They are reddish-brown and shiny. The frons is quite subtly punctate and the antennae are reddish-yellow. The pronotum is quite densely punctate, while the scutellum is sparingly punctate. The elytra are seriato-punctate, with the interstices slightly convex and moderately densely covered with punctures.
