= Neoserica basilica =

Scientific classification
- Kingdom: Animalia
- Phylum: Arthropoda
- Class: Insecta
- Order: Coleoptera
- Suborder: Polyphaga
- Infraorder: Scarabaeiformia
- Family: Scarabaeidae
- Genus: Neoserica
- Species: N. basilica

Binomial name
- Neoserica basilica Brenske, 1902

Species of beetle

Neoserica basilica is a species of beetle of the family Scarabaeidae. It is found in Namibia.

== Description ==
Adults reach a length of about 9–10 mm. They are brown, dull and slightly opalescent. The frons has some individual setate punctures behind the suture, and is finely punctate from there. The pronotum is finely punctate, not projecting, almost straight at the sides. The scutellum is coarsely punctate laterally. The elytra are punctate-striate in rows, the intervals slightly convex, sparsely punctate with individual fine setae.
