= Neoserica brenskei =

Scientific classification
- Kingdom: Animalia
- Phylum: Arthropoda
- Class: Insecta
- Order: Coleoptera
- Suborder: Polyphaga
- Infraorder: Scarabaeiformia
- Family: Scarabaeidae
- Genus: Neoserica
- Species: N. brenskei

Binomial name
- Neoserica brenskei (Frey, 1968)

Synonyms
- Autoserica brenskei Frey, 1968

Species of beetle

Neoserica brenskei is a species of beetle of the family Scarabaeidae. It is found in the Republic of the Congo.

== Description ==
Adults reach a length of about 6–7 mm. The upper and lower surfaces are dark reddish-brown and dull (but the clypeus is glossy). The upper surface is somewhat tomentose. The antennae are light brown. The pronotum is densely but very shallowly punctured and the elytra have very indistinct rows of punctures.
