= Neoserica fruhstorferi =

Scientific classification
- Kingdom: Animalia
- Phylum: Arthropoda
- Class: Insecta
- Order: Coleoptera
- Suborder: Polyphaga
- Infraorder: Scarabaeiformia
- Family: Scarabaeidae
- Genus: Neoserica
- Species: N. fruhstorferi

Binomial name
- Neoserica fruhstorferi Brenske, 1899

Species of beetle

Neoserica fruhstorferi is a species of beetle of the family Scarabaeidae. It is found in Indonesia (Java).

== Description ==
Adults reach a length of about 8 mm. They have a dull, brown (lighter underneath), narrow body, without luster. The pronotum is narrow, the sides straight, the posterior angles quite angular, finely punctate. The scutellum is pointed with a smooth tip. The elytra are striated, but the punctures within the striae are very indistinct, and fine in the spaces between.
