= Neoserica rutilans =

Scientific classification
- Kingdom: Animalia
- Phylum: Arthropoda
- Class: Insecta
- Order: Coleoptera
- Suborder: Polyphaga
- Infraorder: Scarabaeiformia
- Family: Scarabaeidae
- Genus: Neoserica
- Species: N. rutilans

Binomial name
- Neoserica rutilans Ahrens & Fabrizi, 2009

Species of beetle

Neoserica rutilans is a species of beetle of the family Scarabaeidae. It is found in north-eastern India (western Arunachal Pradesh) and China (Yunnan, Xizang).

== Description ==
Adults reach a length of about 11.5-12.8 mm. They have a dark reddish brown, oval body, with some greenish shine dorsally. The dorsal surface is weakly shining and sparsely setose.

== Etymology ==
The species name is derived from Latin rutilans (meaning reddish shimmering).
