= Neoserica sarawakensis =

Scientific classification
- Kingdom: Animalia
- Phylum: Arthropoda
- Clade: Pancrustacea
- Class: Insecta
- Order: Coleoptera
- Suborder: Polyphaga
- Infraorder: Scarabaeiformia
- Family: Scarabaeidae
- Genus: Neoserica
- Species: N. sarawakensis

Binomial name
- Neoserica sarawakensis (Moser, 1915)

Synonyms
- Autoserica sarawakensis Moser, 1915

Species of beetle

Neoserica sarawakensis is a species of beetle of the family Scarabaeidae. It is found in Malaysia (Sarawak).

== Description ==
Adults reach a length of about 13 mm. The head is quite sparsely punctate and the antennae are brown. The pronotum is quite sparsely punctate and the elytra have rows of punctures, with the intervals weakly convex and quite sparsely punctate.
