= Neoserica validipes =

Scientific classification
- Kingdom: Animalia
- Phylum: Arthropoda
- Clade: Pancrustacea
- Class: Insecta
- Order: Coleoptera
- Suborder: Polyphaga
- Infraorder: Scarabaeiformia
- Family: Scarabaeidae
- Genus: Neoserica
- Species: N. validipes

Binomial name
- Neoserica validipes Moser, 1916

Species of beetle

Neoserica validipes is a species of beetle of the family Scarabaeidae. It is found in Cameroon and the Democratic Republic of the Congo.

== Description ==
Adults reach a length of about 9 mm. The frons is dull, finely punctate and covered with a few setae. The pronotum is quite densely and finely punctate, the punctures with tiny setae. The elytra have rows of punctures, with the flat spaces between them quite extensively covered with tiny bristled punctures, and some individual punctures with larger setae.
