= Neoserica curticrus =

Scientific classification
- Kingdom: Animalia
- Phylum: Arthropoda
- Clade: Pancrustacea
- Class: Insecta
- Order: Coleoptera
- Suborder: Polyphaga
- Infraorder: Scarabaeiformia
- Family: Scarabaeidae
- Genus: Neoserica
- Species: N. curticrus

Binomial name
- Neoserica curticrus Moser, 1915

Species of beetle

Neoserica curticrus is a species of beetle of the family Scarabaeidae. It is found in Malaysia (Sabah).

== Description ==
Adults reach a length of about 10 mm. The upper surface is shiny. The head is moderately densely punctate and the frons has a smooth spot in the middle behind the suture. The antennae are yellowish-brown. The pronotum has fairly dense punctation and the elytra have rows of punctures, with the shallow intervals moderately densely covered with strong punctures.
