= Neoserica parausta =

Scientific classification
- Kingdom: Animalia
- Phylum: Arthropoda
- Class: Insecta
- Order: Coleoptera
- Suborder: Polyphaga
- Infraorder: Scarabaeiformia
- Family: Scarabaeidae
- Genus: Neoserica
- Species: N. parausta

Binomial name
- Neoserica parausta Ahrens, Fabrizi & Liu, 2014

Species of beetle

Neoserica parausta is a species of beetle of the family Scarabaeidae. It is found in China (Yunnan).

== Description ==
Adults reach a length of about 9.1 mm. They have a dark reddish brown, oblong body. The antennae are yellow and the dorsal surface is dull and nearly glabrous.

== Etymology ==
The species name is derived from Latin para- (derived from Greek and meaning near) and ustus (from Latin, meaning tanned or browned) and refers to its brown colour.
