= Neoserica phuphami =

Scientific classification
- Kingdom: Animalia
- Phylum: Arthropoda
- Class: Insecta
- Order: Coleoptera
- Suborder: Polyphaga
- Infraorder: Scarabaeiformia
- Family: Scarabaeidae
- Genus: Neoserica
- Species: N. phuphami

Binomial name
- Neoserica phuphami Ahrens & Lukic, 2022

Species of beetle

Neoserica phuphami is a species of beetle of the family Scarabaeidae. It is found in Vietnam.

== Description ==
Adults reach a length of about 7.3 mm. They have a reddish brown, oval body, the dorsal surface with a greenish shine. The elytra have a large, round, black spot before apex and dense, fine, yellowish setae, mixed with dense, longer, erect, yellow setae.

== Etymology ==
The species is named after Phu Pham, a student of Vietnamese scarabs.
