= Neoserica servilis =

Scientific classification
- Kingdom: Animalia
- Phylum: Arthropoda
- Class: Insecta
- Order: Coleoptera
- Suborder: Polyphaga
- Infraorder: Scarabaeiformia
- Family: Scarabaeidae
- Genus: Neoserica
- Species: N. servilis

Binomial name
- Neoserica servilis Brenske, 1899

Synonyms
- Autoserica servilis

Species of beetle

Neoserica servilis is a species of beetle of the family Scarabaeidae. It is found in Indonesia (Java).

== Description ==
Adults reach a length of about 9 mm. They are blackish-brown above and brown below, and vividly glossy. The frons is very finely punctured. The pronotum is only slightly transverse, with a slight projection at the anterior margin, and a row of fine setae behind it. The elytra are rather coarsely punctured, in rows with irregular, finer punctures alongside.
