= Neoserica seydeli =

Scientific classification
- Kingdom: Animalia
- Phylum: Arthropoda
- Clade: Pancrustacea
- Class: Insecta
- Order: Coleoptera
- Suborder: Polyphaga
- Infraorder: Scarabaeiformia
- Family: Scarabaeidae
- Genus: Neoserica
- Species: N. seydeli

Binomial name
- Neoserica seydeli (Moser, 1924)

Synonyms
- Autoserica seydeli Moser, 1924

Species of beetle

Neoserica seydeli is a species of beetle of the family Scarabaeidae. It is found in the Democratic Republic of the Congo.

== Description ==
Adults reach a length of about 6.5 mm. They are reddish-brown and opaque. The antennae are reddish-yellow. The pronotum is setose on the sides and the elytra are seriato-punctate, the punctures with very small setae, some with slightly larger setae.
