= Neoserica pseudovulpina =

Scientific classification
- Kingdom: Animalia
- Phylum: Arthropoda
- Class: Insecta
- Order: Coleoptera
- Suborder: Polyphaga
- Infraorder: Scarabaeiformia
- Family: Scarabaeidae
- Genus: Neoserica
- Species: N. pseudovulpina

Binomial name
- Neoserica pseudovulpina Ahrens, 2003

Species of beetle

Neoserica pseudovulpina is a species of beetle of the family Scarabaeidae. It is found in Vietnam.

== Description ==
Adults reach a length of about 8.7–9.1 mm. They have a reddish brown, oval body. They are mostly dull with dense light hairs, interspersed with dense, long, strong, dark hairs. The underside is densely haired.

== Etymology ==
The species name is derived from Latin pseudo (meaning false) and vulpinus (meaning fox-red).
