= Neoserica symmetrica =

Scientific classification
- Kingdom: Animalia
- Phylum: Arthropoda
- Class: Insecta
- Order: Coleoptera
- Suborder: Polyphaga
- Infraorder: Scarabaeiformia
- Family: Scarabaeidae
- Genus: Neoserica
- Species: N. symmetrica

Binomial name
- Neoserica symmetrica (Frey, 1976)

Synonyms
- Autoserica symmetrica Frey, 1976

Species of beetle

Neoserica symmetrica is a species of beetle of the family Scarabaeidae. It is found in Cameroon.

== Description ==
Adults reach a length of about 6-6.5 mm. The upper surface is blackish-brown, dull and tomentose. The underside and legs are reddish-brown and faintly shiny. The antennae are light brown. The upper surface is glabrous, the elytra and pronotum sparsely fringed with pale hairs.
