= Neoserica kochi =

Scientific classification
- Kingdom: Animalia
- Phylum: Arthropoda
- Class: Insecta
- Order: Coleoptera
- Suborder: Polyphaga
- Infraorder: Scarabaeiformia
- Family: Scarabaeidae
- Genus: Neoserica
- Species: N. kochi

Binomial name
- Neoserica kochi (Frey, 1968)

Synonyms
- Autoserica kochi Frey, 1968

Species of beetle

Neoserica kochi is a species of beetle of the family Scarabaeidae. It is found in Angola.

== Description ==
Adults reach a length of about 10 mm. The upper and lower surfaces are light reddish-brown and the antennae are yellow. The elytra are strongly opalescent and weakly ciliate. The rest of the upper surface is glabrous. The pronotum and scutellum are densely and rather finely punctate, while the elytra have rows of punctures.
