= Neoserica madibirana =

Scientific classification
- Kingdom: Animalia
- Phylum: Arthropoda
- Clade: Pancrustacea
- Class: Insecta
- Order: Coleoptera
- Suborder: Polyphaga
- Infraorder: Scarabaeiformia
- Family: Scarabaeidae
- Genus: Neoserica
- Species: N. madibirana

Binomial name
- Neoserica madibirana (Moser, 1920)

Synonyms
- Autoserica madibirana Moser, 1920

Species of beetle

Neoserica madibirana is a species of beetle of the family Scarabaeidae. It is found in Tanzania.

== Description ==
Adults reach a length of about 9 mm. They are reddish-brown and opaque. The frons is sparsely and subtly punctate and the antennae are reddish-yellow. The pronotum is moderately densely subtly punctate, with minute setae and the elytra are seriate-punctate.
