= Neoserica peregovitsi =

Scientific classification
- Kingdom: Animalia
- Phylum: Arthropoda
- Class: Insecta
- Order: Coleoptera
- Suborder: Polyphaga
- Infraorder: Scarabaeiformia
- Family: Scarabaeidae
- Genus: Neoserica
- Species: N. peregovitsi

Binomial name
- Neoserica peregovitsi Ahrens & Pham, 2021

Species of beetle

Neoserica peregovitsi is a species of beetle of the family Scarabaeidae. It is found in Thailand and Vietnam.

== Description ==
Adults reach a length of about 5.8–6 mm. They have a reddish brown, oblong body. The frons, pronotum and elytra have numerous darker spots and the antennal club is yellowish brown. The dorsal surface is dull and nearly glabrous.

== Etymology ==
The species is named after one of its collectors, L. Peregovits
