= Neoserica fluviatica =

Scientific classification
- Kingdom: Animalia
- Phylum: Arthropoda
- Class: Insecta
- Order: Coleoptera
- Suborder: Polyphaga
- Infraorder: Scarabaeiformia
- Family: Scarabaeidae
- Genus: Neoserica
- Species: N. fluviatica

Binomial name
- Neoserica fluviatica (Brenske, 1902)

Synonyms
- Autoserica fluviatica Brenske, 1902

Species of beetle

Neoserica fluviatica is a species of beetle of the family Scarabaeidae. It is found in Senegal.

== Description ==
Adults reach a length of about 8 mm. They have a dull, brown, oblong-oval, somewhat narrow body, bluish shimmering with an opalescent luster. The frons is finely punctate. The pronotum is densely and finely punctate with weak marginal setae. The antennae are pale yellow.
