= Neoserica strbai =

Scientific classification
- Kingdom: Animalia
- Phylum: Arthropoda
- Class: Insecta
- Order: Coleoptera
- Suborder: Polyphaga
- Infraorder: Scarabaeiformia
- Family: Scarabaeidae
- Genus: Neoserica
- Species: N. strbai

Binomial name
- Neoserica strbai Ahrens, 2003

Species of beetle

Neoserica strbai is a species of beetle of the family Scarabaeidae. It is found in Laos.

== Description ==
Adults reach a length of about 7.3–7.4 mm. They have a reddish-brown, oval body. The forehead and middle of the anterior margin of the pronotum are black and partially has a greenish sheen. They are mostly dull with dense light hairs, interspersed with dense, long, strong, dark hairs. The underside is densely haired.

== Etymology ==
The species is named after its collector, M. Strba.
