= Neoserica weishanensis =

Scientific classification
- Kingdom: Animalia
- Phylum: Arthropoda
- Class: Insecta
- Order: Coleoptera
- Suborder: Polyphaga
- Infraorder: Scarabaeiformia
- Family: Scarabaeidae
- Genus: Neoserica
- Species: N. weishanensis

Binomial name
- Neoserica weishanensis Ahrens, Fabrizi & Liu, 2014

Species of beetle

Neoserica weishanensis is a species of beetle of the family Scarabaeidae. It is found in China (Yunnan).

== Description ==
Adults reach a length of about 8.1–9 mm. They have a dark brown, oblong body. The labroclypeus, legs and margins of the pronotum are lighter and the antennae are yellow. The dorsal surface is dull and nearly glabrous.

== Etymology ==
The species is named after its occurrence in the Weishan mountains.
