= Neoserica garlangensis =

Scientific classification
- Kingdom: Animalia
- Phylum: Arthropoda
- Class: Insecta
- Order: Coleoptera
- Suborder: Polyphaga
- Infraorder: Scarabaeiformia
- Family: Scarabaeidae
- Genus: Neoserica
- Species: N. garlangensis

Binomial name
- Neoserica garlangensis Ahrens, 2004

Species of beetle

Neoserica garlangensis is a species of beetle of the family Scarabaeidae. It is found in the Himalaya of central Nepal.

== Description ==
Adults reach a length of about 9.4-10.3 mm. They have a dark chestnut brown to reddish brown, elongate-oval body (slightly broadened posteriorly). The upper surface is dull and almost completely glabrous, except for some lateral cilia and some setae on the head.

== Etymology ==
The species is named for its type locality, Garlang.
