= Neoserica (Neoserica) antennalis =

Scientific classification
- Kingdom: Animalia
- Phylum: Arthropoda
- Class: Insecta
- Order: Coleoptera
- Suborder: Polyphaga
- Infraorder: Scarabaeiformia
- Family: Scarabaeidae
- Genus: Neoserica
- Species: N. antennalis

Binomial name
- Neoserica antennalis Frey, 1960

Species of beetle

Neoserica antennalis is a species of beetle of the family Scarabaeidae. It is found in Cameroon.

== Description ==
Adults reach a length of about 5.5 mm. The upper surface is dark brown, moderately shiny and opalescent. The underside, legs, and antennae are lighter brown, slightly pruinose on the sides. The punctures on the upper surface have minute setae, but otherwise the upper and lower surfaces are smooth (except for some setae on the underside, margins, and segments).
