= Neoserica fuscula =

Scientific classification
- Kingdom: Animalia
- Phylum: Arthropoda
- Clade: Pancrustacea
- Class: Insecta
- Order: Coleoptera
- Suborder: Polyphaga
- Infraorder: Scarabaeiformia
- Family: Scarabaeidae
- Genus: Neoserica
- Species: N. fuscula

Binomial name
- Neoserica fuscula Moser, 1921

Species of beetle

Neoserica fuscula is a species of beetle of the family Scarabaeidae. It is found in the Philippines (Luzon).

== Description ==
Adults reach a length of about 6 mm. They are dark brown above and reddish-brown underneath. The frons is blackish-brown and sparsely punctate and the antennae are rust-coloured. The pronotum is moderately densely punctate, with the punctures very minutely setose. The elytra are punctate, with the interstices almost smooth.
