= Neoserica lombokiana =

Scientific classification
- Kingdom: Animalia
- Phylum: Arthropoda
- Class: Insecta
- Order: Coleoptera
- Suborder: Polyphaga
- Infraorder: Scarabaeiformia
- Family: Scarabaeidae
- Genus: Neoserica
- Species: N. lombokiana

Binomial name
- Neoserica lombokiana Brenske, 1899

Species of beetle

Neoserica lombokiana is a species of beetle of the family Scarabaeidae. It is found in Indonesia (Flores, Lombok).

== Description ==
Adults reach a length of about 6.5–7.5 mm. They are dull and entirely black (or sometimes with brown elytra). Only the legs are shiny. The pronotum is weakly projecting anteriorly in the middle, the sides almost straight, slightly rounded anteriorly, densely punctate. The elytra are distinctly ribbed.
