= Neoserica lucidula =

Scientific classification
- Kingdom: Animalia
- Phylum: Arthropoda
- Class: Insecta
- Order: Coleoptera
- Suborder: Polyphaga
- Infraorder: Scarabaeiformia
- Family: Scarabaeidae
- Genus: Neoserica
- Species: N. lucidula

Binomial name
- Neoserica lucidula (Péringuey, 1892)

Synonyms
- Serica lucidula Péringuey, 1892; Autoserica lucidula

Species of beetle

Neoserica lucidula is a species of beetle of the family Scarabaeidae. It is found in south-eastern Africa and Zimbabwe.

== Description ==
Adults reach a length of about 6–9 mm. The shape and colouring are identical to that of L. mashona, but the tessellate denuded patches on the elytra are not so dark in the light-coloured specimens, and therefore not so conspicuous.
