= Neoserica ursina =

Scientific classification
- Kingdom: Animalia
- Phylum: Arthropoda
- Class: Insecta
- Order: Coleoptera
- Suborder: Polyphaga
- Infraorder: Scarabaeiformia
- Family: Scarabaeidae
- Genus: Neoserica
- Species: N. ursina

Binomial name
- Neoserica ursina (Brenske, 1894)

Synonyms
- Serica ursina Brenske, 1894

Species of beetle

Neoserica ursina is a species of beetle of the family Scarabaeidae. It is found in China (Shanghai, Zhejiang) and Vietnam.

== Description ==
Adults reach a length of about 7.5–8.1 mm. They have a reddish brown, oval body, partly with a greenish sheen. They are mostly dull with dense short hairs, interspersed with dense, erect, long, strong, dark hairs. The underside is densely haired.
