= Neoserica berlineri =

Scientific classification
- Kingdom: Animalia
- Phylum: Arthropoda
- Class: Insecta
- Order: Coleoptera
- Suborder: Polyphaga
- Infraorder: Scarabaeiformia
- Family: Scarabaeidae
- Genus: Neoserica
- Species: N. berlineri

Binomial name
- Neoserica berlineri Sreedevi & Ahrens, 2025

Species of beetle

Neoserica berlineri is a species of beetle of the family Scarabaeidae. It is found in India (Tamil Nadu).

== Description ==
Adults reach a length of about 16.3 mm. They have a dark brown, oblong-oval body. The antennal club and legs are yellowish brown and the anterior labroclypeus is shiny. The dorsal surface is dull and sparsely setose.

== Etymology ==
The species is named after the collector of the species, Dr. Berliner.
