= Neoserica ritsemae =

Scientific classification
- Kingdom: Animalia
- Phylum: Arthropoda
- Class: Insecta
- Order: Coleoptera
- Suborder: Polyphaga
- Infraorder: Scarabaeiformia
- Family: Scarabaeidae
- Genus: Neoserica
- Species: N. ritsemae

Binomial name
- Neoserica ritsemae Brenske, 1899

Species of beetle

Neoserica ritsemae is a species of beetle of the family Scarabaeidae. It is found on Borneo.

== Description ==
Adults reach a length of about 9 mm. The head, especially the frons, is very broad, the latter with a slight tubercle and dull punctures. The pronotum, which projects forward in the middle, is finely punctured with rounded hind angles. The rows of punctures on the elytra are distinctly impressed. The abdomen is coarsely punctured, with strong rows of setae.
