= Neoserica vietnamensis =

Scientific classification
- Kingdom: Animalia
- Phylum: Arthropoda
- Class: Insecta
- Order: Coleoptera
- Suborder: Polyphaga
- Infraorder: Scarabaeiformia
- Family: Scarabaeidae
- Genus: Neoserica
- Species: N. vietnamensis

Binomial name
- Neoserica vietnamensis Frey, 1972

Synonyms
- Neoserica (Autoserica) vietnamensis Frey, 1972

Species of beetle

Neoserica vietnamensis is a species of beetle of the family Scarabaeidae. It is found in Vietnam.

== Description ==
Adults reach a length of about 6–7 mm. The upper upper surface is blackish-brown, tomentose and dull. The clypeus is shiny and the pygidium is weakly shiny. The underside and legs are brown and the antennae yellowish-brown.
