= Neoserica champassakensis =

Scientific classification
- Kingdom: Animalia
- Phylum: Arthropoda
- Class: Insecta
- Order: Coleoptera
- Suborder: Polyphaga
- Infraorder: Scarabaeiformia
- Family: Scarabaeidae
- Genus: Neoserica
- Species: N. champassakensis

Binomial name
- Neoserica champassakensis Ahrens, 2022

Species of beetle

Neoserica champassakensis is a species of beetle of the family Scarabaeidae. It is found in Laos.

== Description ==
Adults reach a length of about 4–4.1 mm. They have a brown, short-oval body. The antennal club, legs, a large spot on the disc of the elytra and the posterior pronotum are all yellowish brown. The dorsal surface is mostly dull and nearly glabrous.

== Etymology ==
The species is named after its occurrence in the Champassak province.
