= Neoserica rubellula =

Scientific classification
- Kingdom: Animalia
- Phylum: Arthropoda
- Class: Insecta
- Order: Coleoptera
- Suborder: Polyphaga
- Infraorder: Scarabaeiformia
- Family: Scarabaeidae
- Genus: Neoserica
- Species: N. rubellula

Binomial name
- Neoserica rubellula Ahrens, Fabrizi & Liu, 2014

Species of beetle

Neoserica rubellula is a species of beetle of the family Scarabaeidae. It is found in China (Hubei).

== Description ==
Adults reach a length of about 8.1–9.6 mm. They have a dark reddish brown, oblong body. The antennae are yellow and the dorsal surface is dull and nearly glabrous.

== Etymology ==
The species name is derived from Latin rubellulus (meaning somewhat reddish) and refers to its body colour.
