= Neoserica gebieni =

Scientific classification
- Kingdom: Animalia
- Phylum: Arthropoda
- Clade: Pancrustacea
- Class: Insecta
- Order: Coleoptera
- Suborder: Polyphaga
- Infraorder: Scarabaeiformia
- Family: Scarabaeidae
- Genus: Neoserica
- Species: N. gebieni

Binomial name
- Neoserica gebieni Moser, 1918

Species of beetle

Neoserica gebieni is a species of beetle of the family Scarabaeidae. It is found in Indonesia (Java).

== Description ==
Adults reach a length of about 6.5 mm. They are reddish-brown and shiny. The frons is moderately densely punctured and the antennae are reddish-yellow. The pronotum is quite densely punctured and the lateral margins are fringed with cilia. The elytra have rows of punctures, with the intervals punctate.
