= Neoserica kunmingensis =

Scientific classification
- Kingdom: Animalia
- Phylum: Arthropoda
- Class: Insecta
- Order: Coleoptera
- Suborder: Polyphaga
- Infraorder: Scarabaeiformia
- Family: Scarabaeidae
- Genus: Neoserica
- Species: N. kunmingensis

Binomial name
- Neoserica kunmingensis Ahrens, Fabrizi & Liu, 2014

Species of beetle

Neoserica kunmingensis is a species of beetle of the family Scarabaeidae. It is found in China (Guizhou, Yunnan).

== Description ==
Adults reach a length of about 8.8–9 mm. They have a reddish brown, oblong body, with the frons darker. The antennae are yellow and the dorsal surface is dull and nearly glabrous.

== Etymology ==
The species is named after its type locality, Kunming.
