= Neoserica quinqueflabellata =

Scientific classification
- Kingdom: Animalia
- Phylum: Arthropoda
- Class: Insecta
- Order: Coleoptera
- Suborder: Polyphaga
- Infraorder: Scarabaeiformia
- Family: Scarabaeidae
- Genus: Neoserica
- Species: N. quinqueflabellata

Binomial name
- Neoserica quinqueflabellata (Brenske, 1896)

Synonyms
- Serica quinqueflabellata Brenske, 1896

Species of beetle

Neoserica quinqueflabellata is a species of beetle of the family Scarabaeidae. It is found in India (Rajasthan).

== Description ==
Adults reach a length of about 7.5 mm. They have a reddish brown, oval body. The antennae are yellowish brown and the dorsal surface is nearly glabrous and dull, except for some single setae on the head.
