= Neoserica bomuana =

Scientific classification
- Kingdom: Animalia
- Phylum: Arthropoda
- Class: Insecta
- Order: Coleoptera
- Suborder: Polyphaga
- Infraorder: Scarabaeiformia
- Family: Scarabaeidae
- Genus: Neoserica
- Species: N. bomuana

Binomial name
- Neoserica bomuana (Brenske, 1899)

Synonyms
- Autoserica bomuana Brenske, 1899

Species of beetle

Neoserica bomuana is a species of beetle of the family Scarabaeidae. It is found in the Democratic Republic of the Congo.

== Description ==
Adults reach a length of about 8 mm. They have a brown, dull, oblong-oval body. The elytra are densely punctate in striae with narrow, smooth intervals on which fine white setae are scattered. The segments have distinct rows of setae.
