= Neoserica judsoni =

Scientific classification
- Kingdom: Animalia
- Phylum: Arthropoda
- Class: Insecta
- Order: Coleoptera
- Suborder: Polyphaga
- Infraorder: Scarabaeiformia
- Family: Scarabaeidae
- Genus: Neoserica
- Species: N. judsoni

Binomial name
- Neoserica judsoni Ahrens & Pham, 2021

Species of beetle

Neoserica judsoni is a species of beetle of the family Scarabaeidae. It is found in Laos.

== Description ==
Adults reach a length of about 4.2 mm. They have a dark brown, oblong body. The head and pronotal margins are reddish brown and the antennal club is yellowish brown. The dorsal surface is mostly dull and nearly glabrous.

== Etymology ==
The species is named after its collector, Judson Linsley Gressitt.
