= Neoserica tramton =

Scientific classification
- Kingdom: Animalia
- Phylum: Arthropoda
- Class: Insecta
- Order: Coleoptera
- Suborder: Polyphaga
- Infraorder: Scarabaeiformia
- Family: Scarabaeidae
- Genus: Neoserica
- Species: N. tramton

Binomial name
- Neoserica tramton Ahrens & Pham, 2021

Species of beetle

Neoserica tramton is a species of beetle of the family Scarabaeidae. It is found in Vietnam.

== Description ==
Adults reach a length of about 6.4–7.6 mm. They have a dark brown, oblong body. The antennal club and labroclypeus are reddish brown and the pronotum has some greenish colour. The dorsal surface is mostly dull and nearly glabrous.

== Etymology ==
The species is named after the type locality, Tram Ton.
