= Neoserica permagna =

Scientific classification
- Kingdom: Animalia
- Phylum: Arthropoda
- Clade: Pancrustacea
- Class: Insecta
- Order: Coleoptera
- Suborder: Polyphaga
- Infraorder: Scarabaeiformia
- Family: Scarabaeidae
- Genus: Neoserica
- Species: N. permagna

Binomial name
- Neoserica permagna (Moser, 1915)

Synonyms
- Autoserica permagna Moser, 1915

Species of beetle

Neoserica permagna is a species of beetle of the family Scarabaeidae. It is found in Malaysia (Sarawak).

== Description ==
Adults reach a length of about 15 mm. They are blackish-brown above and lighter brown below. The pronotum is densely punctate and the elytra are punctate in striae, with the intervals between the striae slightly convex and punctate.
