= Neoserica somalicola =

Scientific classification
- Kingdom: Animalia
- Phylum: Arthropoda
- Clade: Pancrustacea
- Class: Insecta
- Order: Coleoptera
- Suborder: Polyphaga
- Infraorder: Scarabaeiformia
- Family: Scarabaeidae
- Genus: Neoserica
- Species: N. somalicola

Binomial name
- Neoserica somalicola (Frey, 1976)

Synonyms
- Autoserica somalicola Frey, 1976

Species of beetle

Neoserica somalicola is a species of beetle of the family Scarabaeidae. It is found in Somalia.

== Description ==
Adults reach a length of about 7 mm (0.28 in). The upper and lower surfaces are glossy yellowish-brown with a few yellowish, scattered setae on the thorax and ventral segments, while the rest is glabrous.
