= Neoserica microchaeta =

Scientific classification
- Kingdom: Animalia
- Phylum: Arthropoda
- Clade: Pancrustacea
- Class: Insecta
- Order: Coleoptera
- Suborder: Polyphaga
- Infraorder: Scarabaeiformia
- Family: Scarabaeidae
- Genus: Neoserica
- Species: N. microchaeta

Binomial name
- Neoserica microchaeta (Moser, 1924)

Synonyms
- Autoserica microchaeta Moser, 1924

Species of beetle

Neoserica microchaeta is a species of beetle of the family Scarabaeidae. It is found in Tanzania.

== Description ==
Adults reach a length of about 7.5 mm. They are yellowish-red and opaque. The antennae are reddish-yellow. The elytra are slightly sulcate, with the base of the elytra briefly setose.
