= Neoserica nitens =

Scientific classification
- Kingdom: Animalia
- Phylum: Arthropoda
- Class: Insecta
- Order: Coleoptera
- Suborder: Polyphaga
- Infraorder: Scarabaeiformia
- Family: Scarabaeidae
- Genus: Neoserica
- Species: N. nitens

Binomial name
- Neoserica nitens Frey, 1960

Species of beetle

Neoserica nitens is a species of beetle of the family Scarabaeidae. It is found in Benin.

== Description ==
Adults reach a length of about 6–7 mm. The upper and lower surfaces are dark yellow, moderately shiny, not opalescent and smooth, with only short setae at the lower margin of the ventral segments. The upper surface of the pronotum is evenly and moderately densely punctate, slightly more finely at the base. The elytra have fine striae of punctures.
