= Neoserica fischeri =

Scientific classification
- Kingdom: Animalia
- Phylum: Arthropoda
- Clade: Pancrustacea
- Class: Insecta
- Order: Coleoptera
- Suborder: Polyphaga
- Infraorder: Scarabaeiformia
- Family: Scarabaeidae
- Genus: Neoserica
- Species: N. fischeri

Binomial name
- Neoserica fischeri Moser, 1911

Species of beetle

Neoserica fischeri is a species of beetle of the family Scarabaeidae. It is found in Malaysia (Sabah).

== Description ==
Adults reach a length of about 7.5–8 mm. They are blackish-brown or reddish-brown and shiny. The frons is sparsely punctate, with a few long yellow setae. The pronotum is finely and sparsely punctate and the elytra are rather closely punctate and striate.
