= Neoserica matura =

Scientific classification
- Kingdom: Animalia
- Phylum: Arthropoda
- Class: Insecta
- Order: Coleoptera
- Suborder: Polyphaga
- Infraorder: Scarabaeiformia
- Family: Scarabaeidae
- Genus: Neoserica
- Species: N. matura

Binomial name
- Neoserica matura Ahrens, 2004

Species of beetle

Neoserica matura is a species of beetle of the family Scarabaeidae. It is found in Nepal and India (Meghalaya).

== Description ==
Adults reach a length of about 11-12,6 mm. They have a dark brown, ovate body (while the underside is chestnut brown). The upper surface is dull and mostly glabrous, except for some lateral cilia and some setae on the head.

== Etymology ==
The species name is derived from Latin maturus (meaning ripe).
