= Neoserica sichuanica =

Scientific classification
- Kingdom: Animalia
- Phylum: Arthropoda
- Class: Insecta
- Order: Coleoptera
- Suborder: Polyphaga
- Infraorder: Scarabaeiformia
- Family: Scarabaeidae
- Genus: Neoserica
- Species: N. sichuanica

Binomial name
- Neoserica sichuanica Ahrens, Fabrizi & Liu, 2014

Species of beetle

Neoserica sichuanica is a species of beetle of the family Scarabaeidae. It is found in China (Sichuan).

== Description ==
Adults reach a length of about 8.2–8.5 mm. They have a reddish brown, oblong body, with the frons slightly darker. The dorsal surface is dull and nearly glabrous.

== Etymology ==
The species is named according to its occurrence in Sichuan.
