= Neoserica signativentris =

Scientific classification
- Kingdom: Animalia
- Phylum: Arthropoda
- Clade: Pancrustacea
- Class: Insecta
- Order: Coleoptera
- Suborder: Polyphaga
- Infraorder: Scarabaeiformia
- Family: Scarabaeidae
- Genus: Neoserica
- Species: N. signativentris

Binomial name
- Neoserica signativentris Moser, 1921

Species of beetle

Neoserica signativentris is a species of beetle of the family Scarabaeidae. It is found in Malaysia (Malacca) and Singapore.

== Description ==
Adults reach a length of about 9 mm. They are blackish-brown and opaque. The frons is sparsely punctate and the antennae are reddish-yellow. The elytra are seriate-punctate, with the interstices slightly convex, and covered with punctures.
