= Neoserica ruzickai =

Scientific classification
- Kingdom: Animalia
- Phylum: Arthropoda
- Class: Insecta
- Order: Coleoptera
- Suborder: Polyphaga
- Infraorder: Scarabaeiformia
- Family: Scarabaeidae
- Genus: Neoserica
- Species: N. ruzickai

Binomial name
- Neoserica ruzickai Ahrens, Fabrizi & Liu, 2014

Species of beetle

Neoserica ruzickai is a species of beetle of the family Scarabaeidae. It is found in China (Yunnan).

== Description ==
Adults reach a length of about 7.5 mm. They have a light reddish brown, oblong body. The antennae are yellow and the dorsal surface is dull and nearly glabrous.

== Etymology ==
The species is named after one of its collectors, Jan Růžička.
