= Neoserica incompta =

Scientific classification
- Kingdom: Animalia
- Phylum: Arthropoda
- Class: Insecta
- Order: Coleoptera
- Suborder: Polyphaga
- Infraorder: Scarabaeiformia
- Family: Scarabaeidae
- Genus: Neoserica
- Species: N. incompta

Binomial name
- Neoserica incompta Ahrens & Fabrizi, 2009

Species of beetle

Neoserica incompta is a species of beetle of the family Scarabaeidae. It is found in north-eastern India (Arunachal Pradesh).

== Description ==
Adults reach a length of about 7.4-7.7 mm. They have a yellowish brown, oval body. The dorsal surface is strongly shiny and glabrous.

== Etymology ==
The species name is derived from Latin incomptus (meaning plain or unadorned).
