= Neoserica callosiventris =

Scientific classification
- Kingdom: Animalia
- Phylum: Arthropoda
- Clade: Pancrustacea
- Class: Insecta
- Order: Coleoptera
- Suborder: Polyphaga
- Infraorder: Scarabaeiformia
- Family: Scarabaeidae
- Genus: Neoserica
- Species: N. callosiventris

Binomial name
- Neoserica callosiventris (Moser, 1916)

Synonyms
- Autoserica callosiventris Moser, 1916

Species of beetle

Neoserica callosiventris is a species of beetle of the family Scarabaeidae. It is found in the Democratic Republic of the Congo.

== Description ==
Adults reach a length of about 12 mm. They are brown or blackish-brown, with yellowish-brown antennae. The pronotum is moderately densely punctate.
