= Neoserica dilleri =

Scientific classification
- Kingdom: Animalia
- Phylum: Arthropoda
- Class: Insecta
- Order: Coleoptera
- Suborder: Polyphaga
- Infraorder: Scarabaeiformia
- Family: Scarabaeidae
- Genus: Neoserica
- Species: N. dilleri

Binomial name
- Neoserica dilleri Frey, 1972

Species of beetle

Neoserica dilleri is a species of beetle of the family Scarabaeidae. It is found in Vietnam.

== Description ==
Adults reach a length of about 4–5 mm. The upper and lower surfaces are dark brown and slightly glossy. The antennae are light brown and there are some setae at the eye margin. The pronotum and elytral margins are ciliate and there are a few long setae on the thorax. The tip of the pygidium also has some setae.
