= Neoserica angolana =

Scientific classification
- Kingdom: Animalia
- Phylum: Arthropoda
- Clade: Pancrustacea
- Class: Insecta
- Order: Coleoptera
- Suborder: Polyphaga
- Infraorder: Scarabaeiformia
- Family: Scarabaeidae
- Genus: Neoserica
- Species: N. angolana

Binomial name
- Neoserica angolana (Moser, 1920)

Synonyms
- Autoserica angolana Moser, 1920

Species of beetle

Neoserica angolana is a species of beetle of the family Scarabaeidae. It is found in Angola.

== Description ==
Adults reach a length of about 5 mm. They are very small, blackish-brown and dull, with shiny legs. The punctures on the upper surface have tiny setae. On the elytra, isolated setae are more distinct.
