= Neoserica assamensis =

Scientific classification
- Kingdom: Animalia
- Phylum: Arthropoda
- Class: Insecta
- Order: Coleoptera
- Suborder: Polyphaga
- Infraorder: Scarabaeiformia
- Family: Scarabaeidae
- Genus: Neoserica
- Species: N. assamensis

Binomial name
- Neoserica assamensis (Frey, 1962)

Synonyms
- Leucoserica assamensis Frey, 1962

Species of beetle

Neoserica assamensis is a species of beetle of the family Scarabaeidae. It is found in north-eastern India (Assam, Meghalaya).

== Description ==
Adults reach a length of about 6-6.6 mm. They have a light reddish-brown, oval body. The upper surface is very glossy and glabrous except for a few hairs on the head.
