= Neoserica probsti =

Scientific classification
- Kingdom: Animalia
- Phylum: Arthropoda
- Class: Insecta
- Order: Coleoptera
- Suborder: Polyphaga
- Infraorder: Scarabaeiformia
- Family: Scarabaeidae
- Genus: Neoserica
- Species: N. probsti

Binomial name
- Neoserica probsti Ahrens, 2004

Species of beetle

Neoserica probsti is a species of beetle of the family Scarabaeidae. It is found in eastern Nepal and northern Laos.

== Description ==
Adults reach a length of about 8.4 mm. They have a dark chestnut brown, ovate body. The upper surface is dull and mostly glabrous, except for some lateral cilia and some setae on the head.

== Etymology ==
The species is named for its collector, Johann Probst.
