= Neoserica squalida =

Scientific classification
- Kingdom: Animalia
- Phylum: Arthropoda
- Class: Insecta
- Order: Coleoptera
- Suborder: Polyphaga
- Infraorder: Scarabaeiformia
- Family: Scarabaeidae
- Genus: Neoserica
- Species: N. squalida

Binomial name
- Neoserica squalida Brenske, 1899

Species of beetle

Neoserica squalida is a species of beetle of the family Scarabaeidae. It is found in Malaysia (Sabah).

== Description ==
Adults reach a length of about 6–8 mm. They are dull, brown to dark brown and faintly opalescent. The pronotum is straight at the sides, the anterior margin slightly projecting, the posterior angles weakly rounded and the surface rather coarsely punctate, with minute hairs.
