= Neoserica consimilis =

Scientific classification
- Kingdom: Animalia
- Phylum: Arthropoda
- Class: Insecta
- Order: Coleoptera
- Suborder: Polyphaga
- Infraorder: Scarabaeiformia
- Family: Scarabaeidae
- Genus: Neoserica
- Species: N. consimilis

Binomial name
- Neoserica consimilis (Linell, 1896)

Synonyms
- Serica consimilis Linell, 1896; Autoserica consimilis

Species of beetle

Neoserica consimilis is a species of beetle of the family Scarabaeidae. It is found in Somalia.

== Description ==
Adults reach a length of about 9 mm. They have a dark ferruginous, sericeous, somewhat shining, rather densely punctate, broadly oval body. The antennae are light ferruginous.
