= Neoserica methneri =

Scientific classification
- Kingdom: Animalia
- Phylum: Arthropoda
- Clade: Pancrustacea
- Class: Insecta
- Order: Coleoptera
- Suborder: Polyphaga
- Infraorder: Scarabaeiformia
- Family: Scarabaeidae
- Genus: Neoserica
- Species: N. methneri

Binomial name
- Neoserica methneri (Moser, 1924)

Synonyms
- Autoserica methneri Moser, 1924

Species of beetle

Neoserica methneri is a species of beetle of the family Scarabaeidae. It is found in the Democratic Republic of the Congo.

== Description ==
Adults reach a length of about 7 mm. They are rufous and opaque. The antennae are reddish-yellow. The sides of the elytra are setose.
