= Neoserica akurdi =

Scientific classification
- Kingdom: Animalia
- Phylum: Arthropoda
- Class: Insecta
- Order: Coleoptera
- Suborder: Polyphaga
- Infraorder: Scarabaeiformia
- Family: Scarabaeidae
- Genus: Neoserica
- Species: N. akurdi

Binomial name
- Neoserica akurdi Kalawate, 2025

Species of beetle

Neoserica akurdi is a species of beetle of the family Scarabaeidae. It is found in India (Maharashtra).

== Description ==
Adults reach a length of about 15 mm. They have a reddish-brown, oblong-oval body. The dorsal surface is dull and glabrous with a metallic shine.

== Etymology ==
The species is named after the collection locality, Akurdi.
