= Neoserica ciliata =

Scientific classification
- Kingdom: Animalia
- Phylum: Arthropoda
- Clade: Pancrustacea
- Class: Insecta
- Order: Coleoptera
- Suborder: Polyphaga
- Infraorder: Scarabaeiformia
- Family: Scarabaeidae
- Genus: Neoserica
- Species: N. ciliata

Binomial name
- Neoserica ciliata Moser, 1920

Species of beetle

Neoserica ciliata is a species of beetle of the family Scarabaeidae. It is found in Indonesia (Sumatra).

== Description ==
Adults reach a length of about 9 mm. They are opaque, blackish-brown above and reddish-brown below. The frons is olive-brown and subtly punctate and the antennae are reddish-yellow.
