= Neoserica uniformis =

Scientific classification
- Kingdom: Animalia
- Phylum: Arthropoda
- Class: Insecta
- Order: Coleoptera
- Suborder: Polyphaga
- Infraorder: Scarabaeiformia
- Family: Scarabaeidae
- Genus: Neoserica
- Species: N. uniformis

Binomial name
- Neoserica uniformis Moser, 1920

Species of beetle

Neoserica uniformis is a species of beetle of the family Scarabaeidae. It is found in India (Assam, Nagaland, Meghalaya).

== Description ==
Adults reach a length of about 10-10.8 mm. They have a dark reddish-brown to dark brown, oval body. The upper surface is dull and glabrous, except for a few hairs on the pronotum and elytra.
