= Neoserica badia =

Scientific classification
- Kingdom: Animalia
- Phylum: Arthropoda
- Class: Insecta
- Order: Coleoptera
- Suborder: Polyphaga
- Infraorder: Scarabaeiformia
- Family: Scarabaeidae
- Genus: Neoserica
- Species: N. badia

Binomial name
- Neoserica badia (Brenske, 1902)

Synonyms
- Autoserica badia Brenske, 1902

Species of beetle

Neoserica badia is a species of beetle of the family Scarabaeidae. It is found in Sierra Leone.

== Description ==
Adults reach a length of about 8–9 mm. They have a brown, dull, opalescent, oblong-oval body. The wings are coarsely punctate in rows with minute hairs.
