= Neoserica setigera =

Scientific classification
- Kingdom: Animalia
- Phylum: Arthropoda
- Class: Insecta
- Order: Coleoptera
- Suborder: Polyphaga
- Infraorder: Scarabaeiformia
- Family: Scarabaeidae
- Genus: Neoserica
- Species: N. setigera

Binomial name
- Neoserica setigera (Brenske, 1894)

Synonyms
- Serica setigera Brenske, 1894

Species of beetle

Neoserica setigera is a species of beetle of the family Scarabaeidae. It is found in India (Maharashtra).

== Description ==
Adults reach a length of about 6.5 mm. They have a yellowish brown, oblong-oval body. The dorsal surface is shiny and finely and densely punctate.
