= Neoserica sexfoliata =

Scientific classification
- Kingdom: Animalia
- Phylum: Arthropoda
- Class: Insecta
- Order: Coleoptera
- Suborder: Polyphaga
- Infraorder: Scarabaeiformia
- Family: Scarabaeidae
- Genus: Neoserica
- Species: N. sexfoliata

Binomial name
- Neoserica sexfoliata Moser, 1915

Species of beetle

Neoserica sexfoliata is a species of beetle of the family Scarabaeidae. It is found in southern India and Sri Lanka.

== Description ==
Adults reach a length of about 7.1–8.5 mm. They have a dark reddish brown, oval body, with yellowish brown antennae. The dorsal surface is dull and nearly glabrous.
