= Neoserica loangoana =

Scientific classification
- Kingdom: Animalia
- Phylum: Arthropoda
- Class: Insecta
- Order: Coleoptera
- Suborder: Polyphaga
- Infraorder: Scarabaeiformia
- Family: Scarabaeidae
- Genus: Neoserica
- Species: N. loangoana

Binomial name
- Neoserica loangoana (Brenske, 1902)

Synonyms
- Autoserica loangoana Brenske, 1902

Species of beetle

Neoserica loangoana is a species of beetle of the family Scarabaeidae. It is found in the Democratic Republic of the Congo.

== Description ==
Adults reach a length of about 10 mm. They have a reddish-brown, dull body, with hairs and setae on the elytra.
