= Neoserica vasta =

Scientific classification
- Kingdom: Animalia
- Phylum: Arthropoda
- Class: Insecta
- Order: Coleoptera
- Suborder: Polyphaga
- Infraorder: Scarabaeiformia
- Family: Scarabaeidae
- Genus: Neoserica
- Species: N. vasta

Binomial name
- Neoserica vasta Brenske, 1899

Species of beetle

Neoserica vasta is a species of beetle of the family Scarabaeidae. It is found in Indonesia (Kalimantan).

== Description ==
Adults reach a length of about 10 mm. They are dull, dark brown and slightly greenish metallic on top. The pronotum is slightly projecting anteriorly in the middle and the posterior angles are distinctly rounded.
