= Neoserica madurana =

Scientific classification
- Kingdom: Animalia
- Phylum: Arthropoda
- Clade: Pancrustacea
- Class: Insecta
- Order: Coleoptera
- Suborder: Polyphaga
- Infraorder: Scarabaeiformia
- Family: Scarabaeidae
- Genus: Neoserica
- Species: N. madurana

Binomial name
- Neoserica madurana Moser, 1915

Species of beetle

Neoserica madurana is a species of beetle of the family Scarabaeidae. It is found in India (Tamil Nadu).

== Description ==
Adults reach a length of about 7 mm. The dorsal surface is dull and dark reddish brown, while the ventral surface light brown. The head is sparsely setose.
