= Neoserica armata =

Scientific classification
- Kingdom: Animalia
- Phylum: Arthropoda
- Clade: Pancrustacea
- Class: Insecta
- Order: Coleoptera
- Suborder: Polyphaga
- Infraorder: Scarabaeiformia
- Family: Scarabaeidae
- Genus: Neoserica
- Species: N. armata

Binomial name
- Neoserica armata Moser, 1922

Species of beetle

Neoserica armata is a species of beetle of the family Scarabaeidae. It is found in the Philippines (Luzon).

== Description ==
Adults reach a length of about 12 mm. They are dark and opaque. The head is punctate and the antennae are rust-coloured.
