= Neoserica clypealis =

Scientific classification
- Kingdom: Animalia
- Phylum: Arthropoda
- Clade: Pancrustacea
- Class: Insecta
- Order: Coleoptera
- Suborder: Polyphaga
- Infraorder: Scarabaeiformia
- Family: Scarabaeidae
- Genus: Neoserica
- Species: N. clypealis

Binomial name
- Neoserica clypealis (Burgeon, 1942)

Synonyms
- Autoserica clypealis Burgeon, 1942

Species of beetle

Neoserica clypealis is a species of beetle of the family Scarabaeidae. It is found in the Democratic Republic of the Congo.
