= Neoserica (Autoserica) antennalis =

Scientific classification
- Kingdom: Animalia
- Phylum: Arthropoda
- Class: Insecta
- Order: Coleoptera
- Suborder: Polyphaga
- Infraorder: Scarabaeiformia
- Family: Scarabaeidae
- Genus: Neoserica
- Species: N. antennalis

Binomial name
- Neoserica antennalis (Blanchard, 1850)

Synonyms
- Omaloplia antennalis Blanchard, 1850

Species of beetle

Neoserica antennalis is a species of beetle of the family Scarabaeidae. It is found in Senegal.
