= Neoserica elisabethae =

Scientific classification
- Kingdom: Animalia
- Phylum: Arthropoda
- Clade: Pancrustacea
- Class: Insecta
- Order: Coleoptera
- Suborder: Polyphaga
- Infraorder: Scarabaeiformia
- Family: Scarabaeidae
- Genus: Neoserica
- Species: N. elisabethae

Binomial name
- Neoserica elisabethae Burgeon, 1947

Species of beetle

Neoserica elisabethae is a species of beetle of the family Scarabaeidae. It is found in the Democratic Republic of the Congo.
