= Tetraserica dabuensis =

Scientific classification
- Kingdom: Animalia
- Phylum: Arthropoda
- Class: Insecta
- Order: Coleoptera
- Suborder: Polyphaga
- Infraorder: Scarabaeiformia
- Family: Scarabaeidae
- Genus: Tetraserica
- Species: T. dabuensis

Binomial name
- Tetraserica dabuensis Liu, Ahrens, Li & Yang, 2024

Species of beetle

Tetraserica dabuensis is a species of beetle of the family Scarabaeidae. It is found in China (Guangdong).

== Description ==
Adults reach a length of about 7.3 mm. They have a dark reddish brown, oval body. The dorsal surface is mostly dull and almost glabrous.

== Etymology ==
The species is named after the type locality, Dabu Town.
