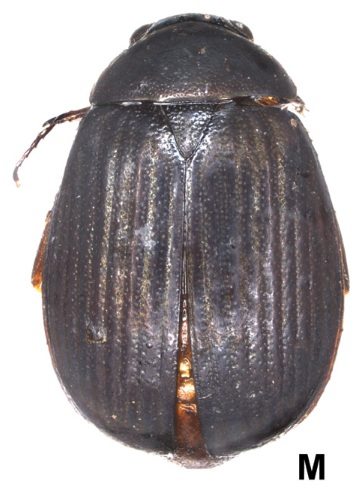

Scientific classification
- Kingdom: Animalia
- Phylum: Arthropoda
- Clade: Pancrustacea
- Class: Insecta
- Order: Coleoptera
- Suborder: Polyphaga
- Infraorder: Scarabaeiformia
- Family: Scarabaeidae
- Genus: Tetraserica
- Species: T. desalvazzai

Binomial name
- Tetraserica desalvazzai Fabrizi, Dalstein & Ahrens, 2019

= Tetraserica desalvazzai =

Species of beetle

Tetraserica desalvazzai is a species of beetle of the family Scarabaeidae. It is found in Laos and Thailand.

== Description ==
Adults reach a length of about 7.6–9.1 mm. The surface of the labroclypeus and the disc of the frons are glabrous. The smooth area anterior to the eye is twice as wide as long.

== Etymology ==
The species is named after the collector, RV de Salvazza.
