= Tetraserica ferrugata =

Scientific classification
- Kingdom: Animalia
- Phylum: Arthropoda
- Class: Insecta
- Order: Coleoptera
- Suborder: Polyphaga
- Infraorder: Scarabaeiformia
- Family: Scarabaeidae
- Genus: Tetraserica
- Species: T. ferrugata

Binomial name
- Tetraserica ferrugata (Blanchard, 1850)

Synonyms
- Omaloplia ferrugata Blanchard, 1850; Serica ferrugata; Autoserica alcocki Brenske, 1898; Serica alcocki

Species of beetle

Tetraserica ferrugata is a species of beetle of the family Scarabaeidae. It is found in India (Himachal Pradesh, Uttarakhand) and Nepal.

== Description ==
Adults reach a length of about 6.6-7.2 mm. The surface is dull and glabrous except for lateral cilia and some setae on the head.
