= Tetraserica takakuwai =

Scientific classification
- Kingdom: Animalia
- Phylum: Arthropoda
- Class: Insecta
- Order: Coleoptera
- Suborder: Polyphaga
- Infraorder: Scarabaeiformia
- Family: Scarabaeidae
- Genus: Tetraserica
- Species: T. takakuwai

Binomial name
- Tetraserica takakuwai Ahrens, 2022

Species of beetle

Tetraserica takakuwai is a species of beetle of the family Scarabaeidae. It is found in Thailand.

== Description ==
Adults reach a length of about 7.4 mm. The dorsal surface is reddish brown and the surface of the labroclypeus and the disc of the frons are glabrous.

== Etymology ==
The species is named after its collector, M. Takakuwa.
