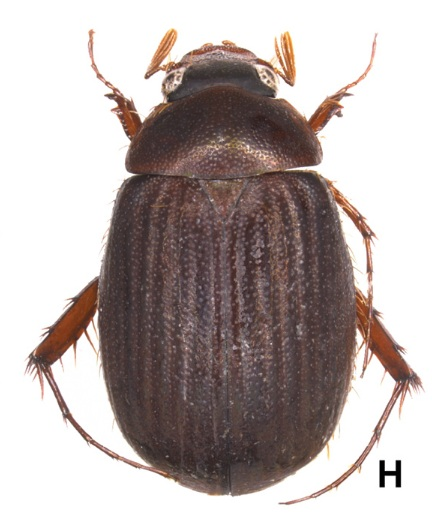

Scientific classification
- Kingdom: Animalia
- Phylum: Arthropoda
- Clade: Pancrustacea
- Class: Insecta
- Order: Coleoptera
- Suborder: Polyphaga
- Infraorder: Scarabaeiformia
- Family: Scarabaeidae
- Genus: Tetraserica
- Species: T. doisangensis

Binomial name
- Tetraserica doisangensis Kobayashi, 2017

= Tetraserica doisangensis =

Species of beetle

Tetraserica doisangensis is a species of beetle of the family Scarabaeidae. It is found in Thailand.
