= Tetraserica quangnam =

Scientific classification
- Kingdom: Animalia
- Phylum: Arthropoda
- Class: Insecta
- Order: Coleoptera
- Suborder: Polyphaga
- Infraorder: Scarabaeiformia
- Family: Scarabaeidae
- Genus: Tetraserica
- Species: T. quangnam

Binomial name
- Tetraserica quangnam Ahrens, Pacholátko & Pham, 2025

Species of beetle

Tetraserica quangnam is a species of beetle of the family Scarabaeidae. It is found in Vietnam.

== Description ==
Adults reach a length of about 11 mm. The dorsal surface is dark brown and glabrous. The margins of the pronotum and ventral surface are reddish brown and the antennae are yellow.

== Etymology ==
The species is named after its occurrence in the Quang Nam province.
