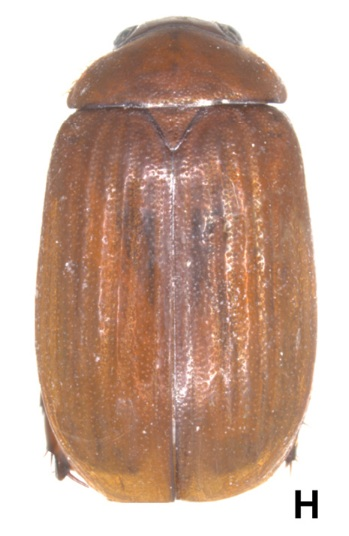

Scientific classification
- Kingdom: Animalia
- Phylum: Arthropoda
- Clade: Pancrustacea
- Class: Insecta
- Order: Coleoptera
- Suborder: Polyphaga
- Infraorder: Scarabaeiformia
- Family: Scarabaeidae
- Genus: Tetraserica
- Species: T. vietnamensis

Binomial name
- Tetraserica vietnamensis (Frey, 1969)

Synonyms
- Neoserica (Autoserica) vietnamensis Frey, 1969

= Tetraserica vietnamensis =

Species of beetle

Tetraserica vietnamensis is a species of beetle of the family Scarabaeidae. It is found in Vietnam.

== Description ==
Adults reach a length of about 10.5 mm. The surface of the labroclypeus and the disc of the frons are glabrous. The smooth area anterior to the eye is twice as wide as long.
