= Tetraserica =

Scientific classification
- Kingdom: Animalia
- Phylum: Arthropoda
- Class: Insecta
- Order: Coleoptera
- Suborder: Polyphaga
- Infraorder: Scarabaeiformia
- Family: Scarabaeidae
- Subfamily: Sericinae
- Tribe: Sericini
- Genus: Tetraserica; Ahrens, 2004

Genus of leaf beetles

Tetraserica is a genus of beetles belonging to the family Scarabaeidae.

== Species ==
- Tetraserica allochangshouensis Fabrizi, Dalstein & Ahrens, 2019
- Tetraserica allomengeana Fabrizi, Dalstein & Ahrens, 2019
- Tetraserica allosejugata Fabrizi, Dalstein & Ahrens, 2019
- Tetraserica angkhangensis Kobayashi, 2017
- Tetraserica angkorthomensis Fabrizi, Dalstein & Ahrens, 2019
- Tetraserica angkorwatensis Fabrizi, Dalstein & Ahrens, 2019
- Tetraserica anhuaensis Liu, Fabrizi, Bai, Yang & Ahrens, 2014
- Tetraserica appendiculata Fabrizi, Dalstein & Ahrens, 2019
- Tetraserica auriculata Fabrizi, Dalstein & Ahrens, 2019
- Tetraserica bachmaensis Fabrizi, Dalstein & Ahrens, 2019
- Tetraserica banhuaipoensis Fabrizi, Dalstein & Ahrens, 2019
- Tetraserica bankrang Ahrens, 2023
- Tetraserica bansanpakiana Fabrizi, Dalstein & Ahrens, 2019
- Tetraserica bartolozzii Ahrens, 2023
- Tetraserica bendai Ahrens & Fabrizi, 2016
- Tetraserica bolavensensis Fabrizi, Dalstein & Ahrens, 2019
- Tetraserica brahmaputrae Ahrens, 2004
- Tetraserica breviforceps Fabrizi, Dalstein & Ahrens, 2019
- Tetraserica cattienensis Fabrizi, Dalstein & Ahrens, 2019
- Tetraserica champassakana Fabrizi, Dalstein & Ahrens, 2019
- Tetraserica changjiangensis Liu, Fabrizi, Bai, Yang & Ahrens, 2014
- Tetraserica changshouensis Liu, Fabrizi, Bai, Yang & Ahrens, 2014
- Tetraserica chiangdaoensis Kobayashi, 2017
- Tetraserica constanti Fabrizi, Dalstein & Ahrens, 2019
- Tetraserica crenatula Ahrens & Fabrizi, 2009
- Tetraserica cucphongensis Fabrizi, Dalstein & Ahrens, 2019
- Tetraserica curviforceps Fabrizi, Dalstein & Ahrens, 2019
- Tetraserica dabuensis Liu, Ahrens, Li & Yang, 2024
- Tetraserica damaidiensis Liu, Fabrizi, Bai, Yang & Ahrens, 2014
- Tetraserica daqingshanica Liu, Fabrizi, Bai, Yang & Ahrens, 2014
- Tetraserica desalvazzai Fabrizi, Dalstein & Ahrens, 2019
- Tetraserica disoccupata Ahrens, 2004
- Tetraserica doiphukhaensis Fabrizi, Dalstein & Ahrens, 2019
- Tetraserica doipuiensis Fabrizi, Dalstein & Ahrens, 2019
- Tetraserica doisangensis Kobayashi, 2017
- Tetraserica doisuthepensis Fabrizi, Dalstein & Ahrens, 2019
- Tetraserica dongnaiensis Fabrizi, Dalstein & Ahrens, 2019
- Tetraserica elargata Ahrens, Pacholátko & Pham, 2025
- Tetraserica fabriziae Liu, Li & Ahrens, 2023
- Tetraserica falciforceps Fabrizi, Dalstein & Ahrens, 2019
- Tetraserica falciformis Fabrizi, Dalstein & Ahrens, 2019
- Tetraserica feresiantarensis Fabrizi, Dalstein & Ahrens, 2019
- Tetraserica ferrugata (Blanchard, 1850)
- Tetraserica fikaceki Liu, Fabrizi, Bai, Yang & Ahrens, 2014
- Tetraserica filiforceps Fabrizi, Dalstein & Ahrens, 2019
- Tetraserica finociliata Fabrizi, Dalstein & Ahrens, 2019
- Tetraserica fulleri Fabrizi, Dalstein & Ahrens, 2019
- Tetraserica geiserae Fabrizi, Dalstein & Ahrens, 2019
- Tetraserica gestroi (Brenske, 1898)
- Tetraserica gialaiensis Pham & Ahrens, 2023
- Tetraserica giulianae Fabrizi, Dalstein & Ahrens, 2019
- Tetraserica gressitti (Frey, 1972)
- Tetraserica guidosabatinellii Ahrens, Pacholátko & Pham, 2025
- Tetraserica haucki Ahrens, Pacholátko & Pham, 2025
- Tetraserica hilaris Ahrens & Fabrizi, 2009
- Tetraserica hongheensis Ahrens, 2021
- Tetraserica hornburgi Ahrens, 2023
- Tetraserica hubleyi Ahrens, 2023
- Tetraserica impar Ahrens & Fabrizi, 2016
- Tetraserica infida Fabrizi, Dalstein & Ahrens, 2019
- Tetraserica jakli Fabrizi, Dalstein & Ahrens, 2019
- Tetraserica jinghongensis Liu, Fabrizi, Bai, Yang & Ahrens, 2014
- Tetraserica khaosoidaoensis Fabrizi, Dalstein & Ahrens, 2019
- Tetraserica khemoi Ahrens, 2023
- Tetraserica kiriromensis Fabrizi, Dalstein & Ahrens, 2019
- Tetraserica koi Fabrizi, Dalstein & Ahrens, 2019
- Tetraserica kollae Fabrizi, Dalstein & Ahrens, 2019
- Tetraserica konchurangensis Fabrizi, Dalstein & Ahrens, 2019
- Tetraserica konplong Ahrens, Pacholátko & Pham, 2025
- Tetraserica kontumensis Fabrizi, Dalstein & Ahrens, 2019
- Tetraserica laotica (Frey, 1972)
- Tetraserica latefemorata Kobayashi, 2017
- Tetraserica leishanica Liu, Fabrizi, Bai, Yang & Ahrens, 2014
- Tetraserica liangheensis Liu, Fabrizi, Bai, Yang & Ahrens, 2014
- Tetraserica linaoshanica Liu, Fabrizi, Bai, Yang & Ahrens, 2014
- Tetraserica loeiensis Fabrizi, Dalstein & Ahrens, 2019
- Tetraserica longipenis Liu, Fabrizi, Bai, Yang & Ahrens, 2014
- Tetraserica longzhouensis Liu, Fabrizi, Bai, Yang & Ahrens, 2014
- Tetraserica lucai Fabrizi, Dalstein & Ahrens, 2019
- Tetraserica lucieae Ahrens, Pacholátko & Pham, 2025
- Tetraserica maerimensis Kobayashi, 2018
- Tetraserica maoershanensis Ahrens, Liu & Fabrizi, 2014
- Tetraserica margheritae Fabrizi, Dalstein & Ahrens, 2019
- Tetraserica masumotoi Kobayashi, 2017
- Tetraserica matsumotoi Kobayashi, 2017
- Tetraserica mengeana Liu, Fabrizi, Bai, Yang & Ahrens, 2014
- Tetraserica menglongensis Liu, Fabrizi, Bai, Yang & Ahrens, 2014
- Tetraserica microfurcata Fabrizi, Dalstein & Ahrens, 2019
- Tetraserica microspinosa Fabrizi, Dalstein & Ahrens, 2019
- Tetraserica miniatula (Moser, 1915)
- Tetraserica misofi Ahrens, Pacholátko & Pham, 2025
- Tetraserica multiangulata Fabrizi, Dalstein & Ahrens, 2019
- Tetraserica nahaeoensis Fabrizi, Dalstein & Ahrens, 2019
- Tetraserica nakaiensis Fabrizi, Dalstein & Ahrens, 2019
- Tetraserica namnaoensis Fabrizi, Dalstein & Ahrens, 2019
- Tetraserica neouncinata Fabrizi, Dalstein & Ahrens, 2019
- Tetraserica nonglomensis Fabrizi, Dalstein & Ahrens, 2019
- Tetraserica nussi Fabrizi, Dalstein & Ahrens, 2019
- Tetraserica olegi Fabrizi, Dalstein & Ahrens, 2019
- Tetraserica pahinngamensis Fabrizi, Dalstein & Ahrens, 2019
- Tetraserica pailinensis Fabrizi, Dalstein & Ahrens, 2019
- Tetraserica parasetuliforceps Fabrizi, Dalstein & Ahrens, 2019
- Tetraserica paraspinicrus Ahrens, Pacholátko & Pham, 2025
- Tetraserica paratonkinensis Fabrizi, Dalstein & Ahrens, 2019
- Tetraserica pellingana Ahrens, 2021
- Tetraserica petrpacholatkoi Fabrizi, Dalstein & Ahrens, 2019
- Tetraserica phamanhi Pham & Ahrens, 2023
- Tetraserica phatoensis Fabrizi, Dalstein & Ahrens, 2019
- Tetraserica phoupaneensis Fabrizi, Dalstein & Ahrens, 2019
- Tetraserica phukradungensis Fabrizi, Dalstein & Ahrens, 2019
- Tetraserica pingjiangensis Liu, Fabrizi, Bai, Yang & Ahrens, 2014
- Tetraserica pluriuncinata Fabrizi, Dalstein & Ahrens, 2019
- Tetraserica pseudoliangheensis Fabrizi, Dalstein & Ahrens, 2019
- Tetraserica pseudoruiliensis Fabrizi, Dalstein & Ahrens, 2019
- Tetraserica pseudospinicrus Ahrens, Pacholátko & Pham, 2025
- Tetraserica pseudouncinata Fabrizi, Dalstein & Ahrens, 2019
- Tetraserica qifengshanensis Ahrens, 2021
- Tetraserica quadriforceps Fabrizi, Dalstein & Ahrens, 2019
- Tetraserica quadrifurcata Fabrizi, Dalstein & Ahrens, 2019
- Tetraserica quangnam Ahrens, Pacholátko & Pham, 2025
- Tetraserica quangtri Ahrens, Pacholátko & Pham, 2025
- Tetraserica rihai Fabrizi, Dalstein & Ahrens, 2019
- Tetraserica romae Fabrizi, Dalstein & Ahrens, 2019
- Tetraserica rubrithorax Fabrizi, Dalstein & Ahrens, 2019
- Tetraserica rufimargo Ahrens & Fabrizi, 2016
- Tetraserica ruiliana Liu, Fabrizi, Bai, Yang & Ahrens, 2014
- Tetraserica ruiliensis Ahrens, Liu & Fabrizi, 2014
- Tetraserica rungbongensis Ahrens, 2004
- Tetraserica sapana Fabrizi, Dalstein & Ahrens, 2019
- Tetraserica satura (Brenske, 1898)
- Tetraserica schneideri Ahrens, 2004
- Tetraserica schnelli Ahrens, Pacholátko & Pham, 2025
- Tetraserica sculptilis Liu, Fabrizi, Bai, Yang & Ahrens, 2014
- Tetraserica sejugata (Brenske, 1898)
- Tetraserica semidamadiensis Fabrizi, Dalstein & Ahrens, 2019
- Tetraserica semikontumensis Pham & Ahrens, 2023
- Tetraserica semipingjiangensis Fabrizi, Dalstein & Ahrens, 2019
- Tetraserica semiruiliensis Fabrizi, Dalstein & Ahrens, 2019
- Tetraserica semishanensis Fabrizi, Dalstein & Ahrens, 2019
- Tetraserica senohi Kobayashi, 2018
- Tetraserica setuliforceps Fabrizi, Dalstein & Ahrens, 2019
- Tetraserica shanensis Fabrizi, Dalstein & Ahrens, 2019
- Tetraserica shangsiensis Liu, Fabrizi, Bai, Yang & Ahrens, 2014
- Tetraserica shunbiensis Liu, Fabrizi, Bai, Yang & Ahrens, 2014
- Tetraserica siantarensis (Moser, 1922)
- Tetraserica sigulianshanica Liu, Fabrizi, Bai, Yang & Ahrens, 2014
- Tetraserica similis Ahrens, Pacholátko & Pham, 2025
- Tetraserica smetsi Fabrizi, Dalstein & Ahrens, 2019
- Tetraserica sonla Ahrens, Pacholátko & Pham, 2025
- Tetraserica soppongana Fabrizi, Dalstein & Ahrens, 2019
- Tetraserica spanglerorum Fabrizi, Dalstein & Ahrens, 2019
- Tetraserica spinicrus (Frey, 1972)
- Tetraserica spinotibialis Fabrizi, Dalstein & Ahrens, 2019
- Tetraserica sraeken Ahrens, 2023
- Tetraserica strbai Ahrens, Pacholátko & Pham, 2025
- Tetraserica subrotundata Fabrizi, Dalstein & Ahrens, 2019
- Tetraserica takahashii Kobayashi, 2017
- Tetraserica takakuwai Ahrens, 2022
- Tetraserica tanahrataensis Fabrizi, Dalstein & Ahrens, 2019
- Tetraserica thainguyensis Fabrizi, Dalstein & Ahrens, 2019
- Tetraserica tianchiensis Liu, Fabrizi, Bai, Yang & Ahrens, 2014
- Tetraserica tonkinensis (Moser, 1908)
- Tetraserica trilobiforceps Fabrizi, Dalstein & Ahrens, 2019
- Tetraserica ululalatensis Fabrizi, Dalstein & Ahrens, 2019
- Tetraserica umphangensis Fabrizi, Dalstein & Ahrens, 2019
- Tetraserica uncinata Ahrens & Fabrizi, 2016
- Tetraserica univestris Ahrens & Fabrizi, 2016
- Tetraserica vari Fabrizi, Dalstein & Ahrens, 2019
- Tetraserica veliformis Fabrizi, Dalstein & Ahrens, 2019
- Tetraserica vientianeensis Fabrizi, Dalstein & Ahrens, 2019
- Tetraserica vietnamensis (Frey, 1969)
- Tetraserica wandingensis Liu, Fabrizi, Bai, Yang & Ahrens, 2014
- Tetraserica wangtongensis Liu, Fabrizi, Bai, Yang & Ahrens, 2014
- Tetraserica wapiensis (Frey, 1972)
- Tetraserica weigeli Ahrens, 2023
- Tetraserica wiangpapaoana Kobayashi, 2017
- Tetraserica xichouensis Liu, Fabrizi, Bai, Yang & Ahrens, 2014
- Tetraserica xiengkhouangensis Fabrizi, Dalstein & Ahrens, 2019
- Tetraserica yaoanica Liu, Fabrizi, Bai, Yang & Ahrens, 2014
- Tetraserica yaoquensis Liu, Fabrizi, Bai, Yang & Ahrens, 2014
- Tetraserica yongbelar Ahrens, 2023
- Tetraserica yucheni Liu, Li & Ahrens, 2023
- Tetraserica zhuhaiensis Zhao, Huang, Huang & Ahrens, 2025
