= Tetraserica yucheni =

Scientific classification
- Kingdom: Animalia
- Phylum: Arthropoda
- Class: Insecta
- Order: Coleoptera
- Suborder: Polyphaga
- Infraorder: Scarabaeiformia
- Family: Scarabaeidae
- Genus: Tetraserica
- Species: T. yucheni

Binomial name
- Tetraserica yucheni Liu, Li & Ahrens, 2023

Species of beetle

Tetraserica yucheni is a species of beetle of the family Scarabaeidae. It is found in China (Yunnan).

== Description ==
Adults reach a length of about 8.7–10.1 mm. They have a dark reddish brown, oval body. The dorsal surface is shiny and glabrous.

== Etymology ==
The species is named after of its collectors, Zhao Yuchen.
