= Tetraserica phamanhi =

Scientific classification
- Kingdom: Animalia
- Phylum: Arthropoda
- Class: Insecta
- Order: Coleoptera
- Suborder: Polyphaga
- Infraorder: Scarabaeiformia
- Family: Scarabaeidae
- Genus: Tetraserica
- Species: T. phamanhi

Binomial name
- Tetraserica phamanhi Pham & Ahrens, 2023

Species of beetle

Tetraserica phamanhi is a species of beetle of the family Scarabaeidae. It is found in Laos and Vietnam.

== Description ==
Adults reach a length of about 8.6–9 mm. They have a dark reddish brown, oval body. The dorsal surface is shiny and glabrous.

== Etymology ==
The species is named after Associate Professor Pham Van Anh who arranged expeditions during which the type material of this species was collected.
