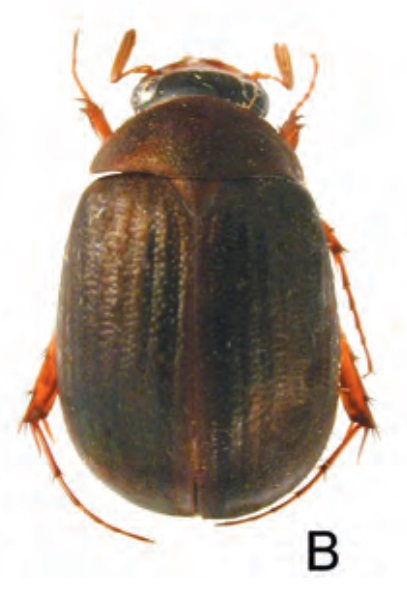

Scientific classification
- Kingdom: Animalia
- Phylum: Arthropoda
- Class: Insecta
- Order: Coleoptera
- Suborder: Polyphaga
- Infraorder: Scarabaeiformia
- Family: Scarabaeidae
- Genus: Tetraserica
- Species: T. brahmaputrae

Binomial name
- Tetraserica brahmaputrae Ahrens, 2004

= Tetraserica brahmaputrae =

Species of beetle

Tetraserica brahmaputrae is a species of beetle of the family Scarabaeidae. It is found in Bhutan, India (Assam, Meghalaya) and eastern Nepal.

== Description ==
Adults reach a length of about 7.6-9.1 mm. They have a dark chestnut brown, oval body. The dorsal surface is dull and glabrous, except for the lateral cilia and some setae on the head.

== Etymology ==
The species is named for the Brahmaputra River.
