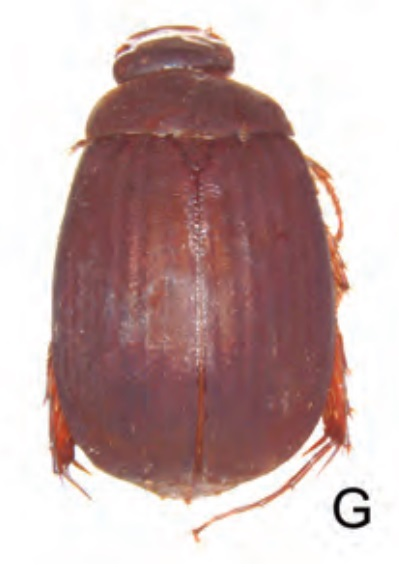

Scientific classification
- Kingdom: Animalia
- Phylum: Arthropoda
- Clade: Pancrustacea
- Class: Insecta
- Order: Coleoptera
- Suborder: Polyphaga
- Infraorder: Scarabaeiformia
- Family: Scarabaeidae
- Genus: Tetraserica
- Species: T. univestris

Binomial name
- Tetraserica univestris Ahrens & Fabrizi, 2016

= Tetraserica univestris =

Species of beetle

Tetraserica univestris is a species of beetle of the family Scarabaeidae. It is found in India (Assam, Mizoram).

== Description ==
Adults reach a length of about 7.9 mm. They have a dark brown, oval body. The legs and ventral surface are reddish brown and the antennae are yellowish brown. The dorsal surface is dull and glabrous.

== Etymology ==
The species name is derived from Latin univestris (meaning concordant) and refers to the strong similarity among the Tetraserica species' external morphology.
