= Tetraserica schnelli =

Scientific classification
- Kingdom: Animalia
- Phylum: Arthropoda
- Class: Insecta
- Order: Coleoptera
- Suborder: Polyphaga
- Infraorder: Scarabaeiformia
- Family: Scarabaeidae
- Genus: Tetraserica
- Species: T. schnelli

Binomial name
- Tetraserica schnelli Ahrens, Pacholátko & Pham, 2025

Species of beetle

Tetraserica schnelli is a species of beetle of the family Scarabaeidae. It is found in Laos.

== Description ==
Adults reach a length of about 8.4–8.6 mm. The dorsal surface is dark brown and glabrous. The pronotum has a weak greenish shine, the ventral surface and legs are partly yellowish and partly reddish brown and the antennae are yellow.

== Etymology ==
The species is dedicated to Michael Schnell (Museum Koenig Bonn).
