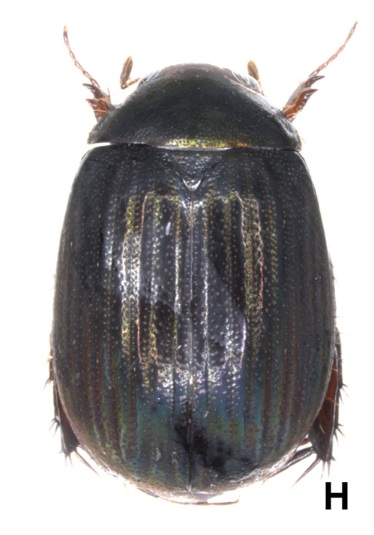

Scientific classification
- Kingdom: Animalia
- Phylum: Arthropoda
- Clade: Pancrustacea
- Class: Insecta
- Order: Coleoptera
- Suborder: Polyphaga
- Infraorder: Scarabaeiformia
- Family: Scarabaeidae
- Genus: Tetraserica
- Species: T. angkorwatensis

Binomial name
- Tetraserica angkorwatensis Fabrizi, Dalstein & Ahrens, 2019

= Tetraserica angkorwatensis =

Species of beetle

Tetraserica angkorwatensis is a species of beetle of the family Scarabaeidae. It is found in Cambodia.

== Description ==
Adults reach a length of about 7.5–7.8 mm. The surface of the labroclypeus and the disc of the frons are glabrous. The smooth area anterior to the eye is twice as wide as long.

== Etymology ==
The species name refers to the type locality, Angkor Wat.
