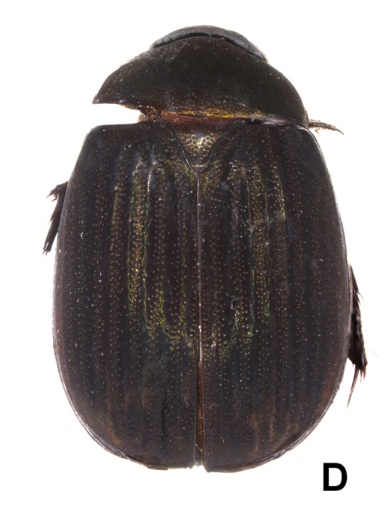

Scientific classification
- Kingdom: Animalia
- Phylum: Arthropoda
- Clade: Pancrustacea
- Class: Insecta
- Order: Coleoptera
- Suborder: Polyphaga
- Infraorder: Scarabaeiformia
- Family: Scarabaeidae
- Genus: Tetraserica
- Species: T. auriculata

Binomial name
- Tetraserica auriculata Fabrizi, Dalstein & Ahrens, 2019

= Tetraserica auriculata =

Species of beetle

Tetraserica auriculata is a species of beetle of the family Scarabaeidae. It is found in Cambodia.

== Description ==
Adults reach a length of about 8.1 mm. The surface of the labroclypeus and the disc of the frons are glabrous. The smooth area anterior to the eye is twice as wide as long.

== Etymology ==
The species name is derived from Latin auriculatus (meaning ear-shaped) and refers to the ear-shaped median apical lamella of phallobase.
