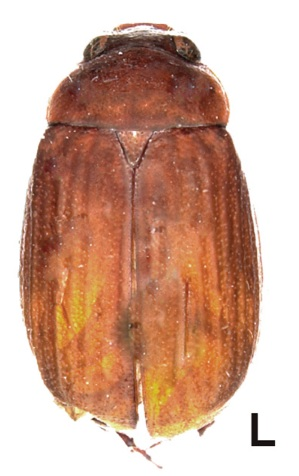

Scientific classification
- Kingdom: Animalia
- Phylum: Arthropoda
- Clade: Pancrustacea
- Class: Insecta
- Order: Coleoptera
- Suborder: Polyphaga
- Infraorder: Scarabaeiformia
- Family: Scarabaeidae
- Genus: Tetraserica
- Species: T. yaoanica

Binomial name
- Tetraserica yaoanica Liu, Fabrizi, Bai, Yang & Ahrens, 2014

= Tetraserica yaoanica =

Species of beetle

Tetraserica yaoanica is a species of beetle of the family Scarabaeidae. It is found in China (Fujian, Guangdong, Guangxi, Hunan, Jiangxi) and Vietnam.

== Description ==
Adults reach a length of about 6.6–7.9 mm. The body is reddish brown. The labroclypeus surface has a few erect setae and the disc of the frons has a few single setae. The smooth area in front of the eye is approximately four times as wide as long.

== Etymology ==
The species is named after its type locality, Yaoan.
