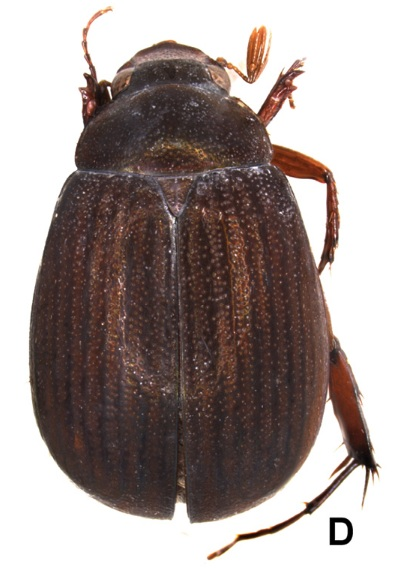

Scientific classification
- Kingdom: Animalia
- Phylum: Arthropoda
- Clade: Pancrustacea
- Class: Insecta
- Order: Coleoptera
- Suborder: Polyphaga
- Infraorder: Scarabaeiformia
- Family: Scarabaeidae
- Genus: Tetraserica
- Species: T. tanahrataensis

Binomial name
- Tetraserica tanahrataensis Fabrizi, Dalstein & Ahrens, 2019

= Tetraserica tanahrataensis =

Species of beetle

Tetraserica tanahrataensis is a species of beetle of the family Scarabaeidae. It is found in Malaysia.

== Description ==
Adults reach a length of about 9.6–9.9 mm. The surface of the labroclypeus and the disc of the frons are glabrous. The smooth area anterior to the eye is twice as wide as long.

== Etymology ==
The species is named after the type locality, Tanahrata.
