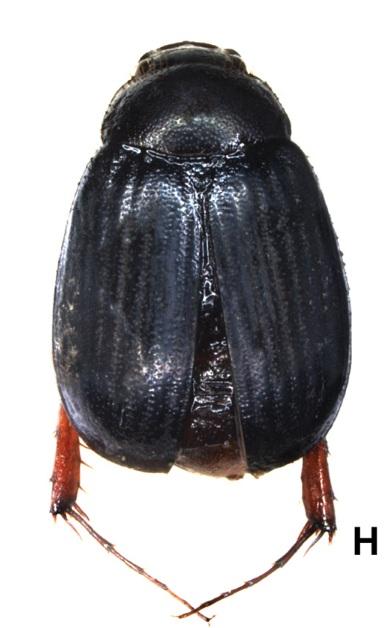

Scientific classification
- Kingdom: Animalia
- Phylum: Arthropoda
- Clade: Pancrustacea
- Class: Insecta
- Order: Coleoptera
- Suborder: Polyphaga
- Infraorder: Scarabaeiformia
- Family: Scarabaeidae
- Genus: Tetraserica
- Species: T. olegi

Binomial name
- Tetraserica olegi Fabrizi, Dalstein & Ahrens, 2019

= Tetraserica olegi =

Species of beetle

Tetraserica olegi, is a species of beetle of the family Scarabaeidae. It is found in Vietnam.

== Description ==
Adults reach a length of about 6.8 mm. The dorsal surface is blackish and the ventral surface is reddish brown. The surface of the labroclypeus and the disc of the frons are glabrous. The smooth area anterior to the eye is twice as wide as long.

== Etymology ==
The species is named after Oleg N Kabakov.
