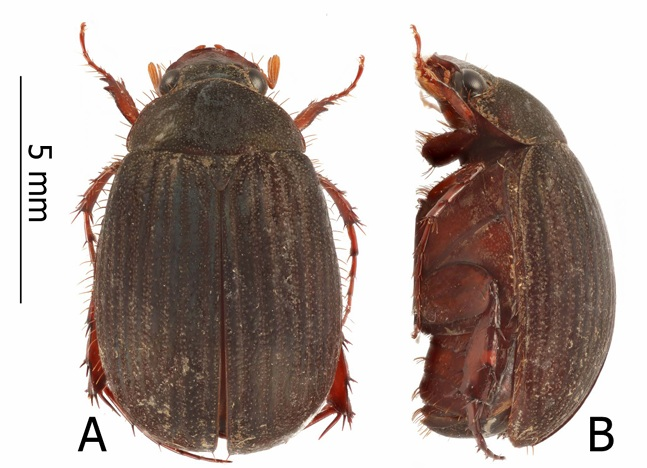

Scientific classification
- Kingdom: Animalia
- Phylum: Arthropoda
- Class: Insecta
- Order: Coleoptera
- Suborder: Polyphaga
- Infraorder: Scarabaeiformia
- Family: Scarabaeidae
- Genus: Tetraserica
- Species: T. zhuhaiensis

Binomial name
- Tetraserica zhuhaiensis Zhao, Huang, Huang & Ahrens, 2025

= Tetraserica zhuhaiensis =

Species of beetle

Tetraserica zhuhaiensis is a species of beetle of the family Scarabaeidae. It is found in China (Guangdong).

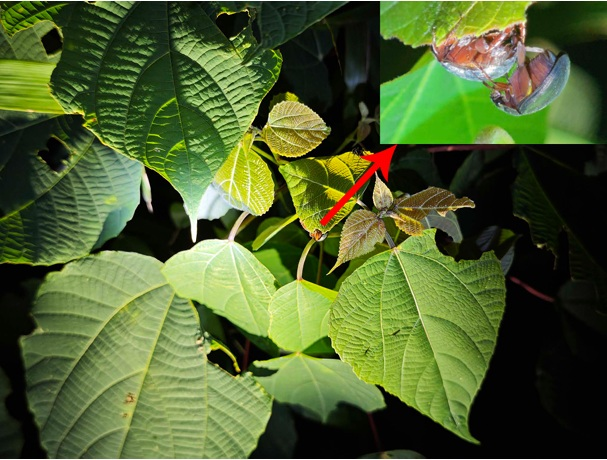
Tetraserica zhuhaiensis mating on its host plant Alchornea trewioides

== Description ==
Adults reach a length of about 8.7–10.3 mm. The body is oval. The dorsal surface including the pygidium is dark brown and glabrous and the frons and pronotum have a weak greenish shine. The labroclypeus, ventral surface and legs are reddish brown and the antennae are yellow.

== Etymology ==
The species is named after Zhuhai City, where the type series was collected.
