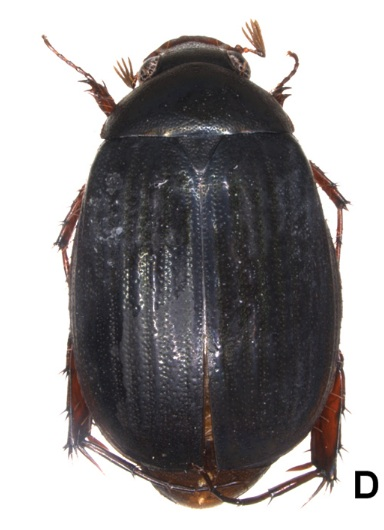

Scientific classification
- Kingdom: Animalia
- Phylum: Arthropoda
- Clade: Pancrustacea
- Class: Insecta
- Order: Coleoptera
- Suborder: Polyphaga
- Infraorder: Scarabaeiformia
- Family: Scarabaeidae
- Genus: Tetraserica
- Species: T. konchurangensis

Binomial name
- Tetraserica konchurangensis Fabrizi, Dalstein & Ahrens, 2019

= Tetraserica konchurangensis =

Species of beetle

Tetraserica konchurangensis is a species of beetle of the family Scarabaeidae. It is found in Vietnam.

== Description ==
Adults reach a length of about 8.6–9.8 mm. The surface of the labroclypeus and the disc of the frons are glabrous. The smooth area anterior to the eye is twice as wide as long.

== Etymology ==
The species name refers to its occurrence in the Kon Chu Rang Nature Reserve.
