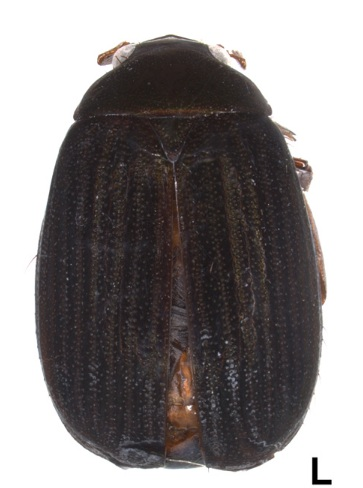

Scientific classification
- Kingdom: Animalia
- Phylum: Arthropoda
- Clade: Pancrustacea
- Class: Insecta
- Order: Coleoptera
- Suborder: Polyphaga
- Infraorder: Scarabaeiformia
- Family: Scarabaeidae
- Genus: Tetraserica
- Species: T. petrpacholatkoi

Binomial name
- Tetraserica petrpacholatkoi Fabrizi, Dalstein & Ahrens, 2019

= Tetraserica petrpacholatkoi =

Species of beetle

Tetraserica petrpacholatkoi is a species of beetle of the family Scarabaeidae. It is found in Vietnam.

== Description ==
Adults reach a length of about 9.8–10 mm. The surface of the labroclypeus and the disc of the frons are glabrous. The smooth area anterior to the eye is twice as wide as long.

== Etymology ==
The species is named after one of its collectors, Petr Pacholátko.
