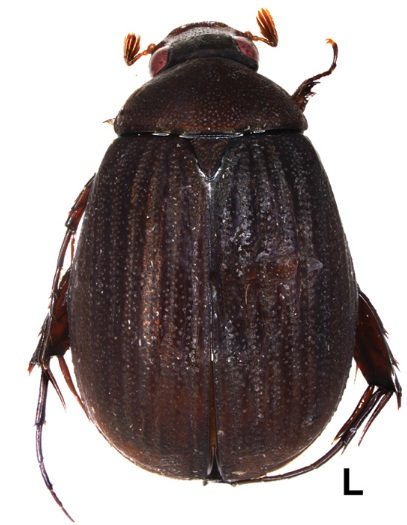

Scientific classification
- Kingdom: Animalia
- Phylum: Arthropoda
- Clade: Pancrustacea
- Class: Insecta
- Order: Coleoptera
- Suborder: Polyphaga
- Infraorder: Scarabaeiformia
- Family: Scarabaeidae
- Genus: Tetraserica
- Species: T. spinotibialis

Binomial name
- Tetraserica spinotibialis Fabrizi, Dalstein & Ahrens, 2019

= Tetraserica spinotibialis =

Species of beetle

Tetraserica spinotibialis is a species of beetle of the family Scarabaeidae. It is found in Thailand.

== Description ==
Adults reach a length of about 9–9.9 mm. The surface of the labroclypeus and the disc of the frons are glabrous. The smooth area anterior to the eye is twice as wide as long.

== Etymology ==
The species name is derived from Latin spina and tibialis and refers to the strongly developed spine of the mesotibia.
