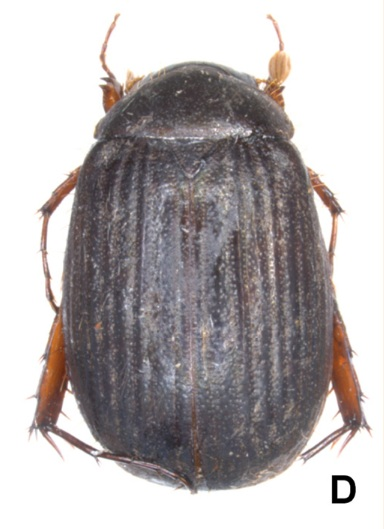

Scientific classification
- Kingdom: Animalia
- Phylum: Arthropoda
- Clade: Pancrustacea
- Class: Insecta
- Order: Coleoptera
- Suborder: Polyphaga
- Infraorder: Scarabaeiformia
- Family: Scarabaeidae
- Genus: Tetraserica
- Species: T. satura

Binomial name
- Tetraserica satura (Brenske, 1899)

Synonyms
- Neoserica satura Brenske, 1899; Tetraserica graciliforceps Liu, Fabrizi, Bai, Yang & Ahrens, 2014

= Tetraserica satura =

Species of beetle

Tetraserica satura is a species of beetle of the family Scarabaeidae. It is found in Myanmar, Thailand, Vietnam and China (Yunnan).

== Description ==
Adults reach a length of about 8.9–9.8 mm. The surface of the labroclypeus and the disc of the frons are glabrous. The smooth area anterior to the eye is twice as wide as long.
