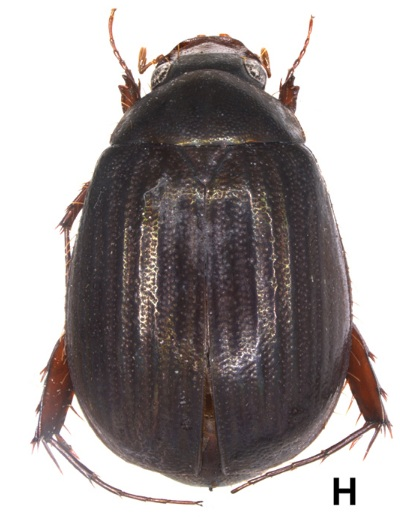

Scientific classification
- Kingdom: Animalia
- Phylum: Arthropoda
- Clade: Pancrustacea
- Class: Insecta
- Order: Coleoptera
- Suborder: Polyphaga
- Infraorder: Scarabaeiformia
- Family: Scarabaeidae
- Genus: Tetraserica
- Species: T. phatoensis

Binomial name
- Tetraserica phatoensis Fabrizi, Dalstein & Ahrens, 2019

= Tetraserica phatoensis =

Species of beetle

Tetraserica phatoensis is a species of beetle of the family Scarabaeidae. It is found in Thailand.

== Description ==
Adults reach a length of about 8.3 mm. The dorsal surface is blackish and the ventral surface is reddish brown. The surface of the labroclypeus and the disc of the frons are glabrous. The smooth area anterior to the eye is twice as wide as long.

== Etymology ==
The species name refers to its type locality, Pha To.
