= Tetraserica disoccupata =

Scientific classification
- Kingdom: Animalia
- Phylum: Arthropoda
- Class: Insecta
- Order: Coleoptera
- Suborder: Polyphaga
- Infraorder: Scarabaeiformia
- Family: Scarabaeidae
- Genus: Tetraserica
- Species: T. disoccupata

Binomial name
- Tetraserica disoccupata Ahrens, 2004

Species of beetle

Tetraserica disoccupata is a species of beetle of the family Scarabaeidae. It is found in India (Sikkim).

== Description ==
Adults reach a length of about 5.8 mm. They have a dark reddish-brown, oval body. The dorsal surface is dull and mostly glabrous.

== Etymology ==
The species name is derived from Latin disoccupatus (meaning unemployed).
