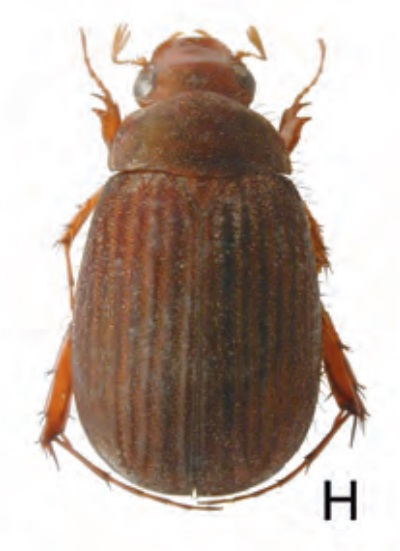

Scientific classification
- Kingdom: Animalia
- Phylum: Arthropoda
- Class: Insecta
- Order: Coleoptera
- Suborder: Polyphaga
- Infraorder: Scarabaeiformia
- Family: Scarabaeidae
- Genus: Tetraserica
- Species: T. schneideri

Binomial name
- Tetraserica schneideri Ahrens, 2004

= Tetraserica schneideri =

Species of beetle

Tetraserica schneideri is a species of beetle of the family Scarabaeidae. It is found in India (Sikkim).

== Description ==
Adults reach a length of about 7.7-8.1 mm. They have a dark reddish-brown, oblong-oval body. The dorsal surface is dull and glabrous.

== Etymology ==
The species is named for its collector, Jan Schneider.
