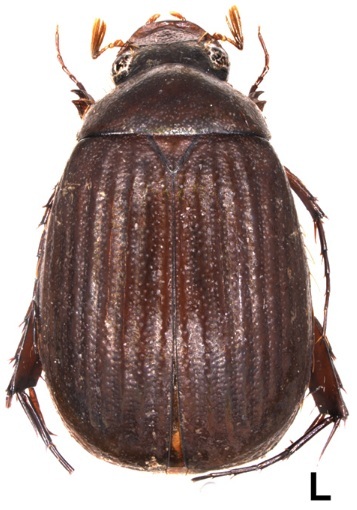

Scientific classification
- Kingdom: Animalia
- Phylum: Arthropoda
- Clade: Pancrustacea
- Class: Insecta
- Order: Coleoptera
- Suborder: Polyphaga
- Infraorder: Scarabaeiformia
- Family: Scarabaeidae
- Genus: Tetraserica
- Species: T. nonglomensis

Binomial name
- Tetraserica nonglomensis Fabrizi, Dalstein & Ahrens, 2019

= Tetraserica nonglomensis =

Species of beetle

Tetraserica nonglomensis is a species of beetle of the family Scarabaeidae. It is found in Laos.

== Description ==
Adults reach a length of about 8 mm. The surface of the labroclypeus and the disc of the frons are glabrous. The smooth area anterior to the eye is twice as wide as long.

== Etymology ==
The species is named after the type locality, Nong Lom Lake.
