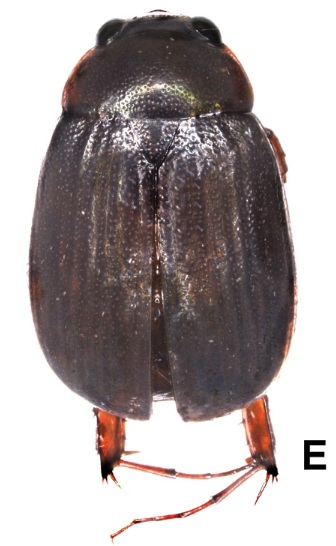

Scientific classification
- Kingdom: Animalia
- Phylum: Arthropoda
- Clade: Pancrustacea
- Class: Insecta
- Order: Coleoptera
- Suborder: Polyphaga
- Infraorder: Scarabaeiformia
- Family: Scarabaeidae
- Genus: Tetraserica
- Species: T. kollae

Binomial name
- Tetraserica kollae Fabrizi, Dalstein & Ahrens, 2019

= Tetraserica kollae =

Species of beetle

Tetraserica kollae, is a species of beetle of the family Scarabaeidae. It is found in India (Mizoram).

== Description ==
Adults reach a length of about 7.5–7.8 mm. The surface of the labroclypeus and the disc of the frons are glabrous. The smooth area anterior to the eye is twice as wide as long.

== Etymology ==
The species is named after Dr Kolla Sreedevi, collector of the species.
