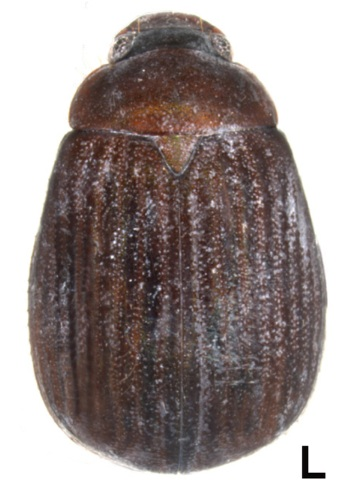

Scientific classification
- Kingdom: Animalia
- Phylum: Arthropoda
- Clade: Pancrustacea
- Class: Insecta
- Order: Coleoptera
- Suborder: Polyphaga
- Infraorder: Scarabaeiformia
- Family: Scarabaeidae
- Genus: Tetraserica
- Species: T. wangtongensis

Binomial name
- Tetraserica wangtongensis Liu, Fabrizi, Bai, Yang & Ahrens, 2014

= Tetraserica wangtongensis =

Species of beetle

Tetraserica wangtongensis is a species of beetle of the family Scarabaeidae. It is found in China (Guangdong, Hong Kong, Jiangxi).

== Description ==
Adults reach a length of about 8.2–9.1 mm. The surface of the labroclypeus and the disc of the frons are glabrous. The smooth area anterior to the eye is twice as wide as long.

== Etymology ==
The species is named after its type locality, Wang Tong.
