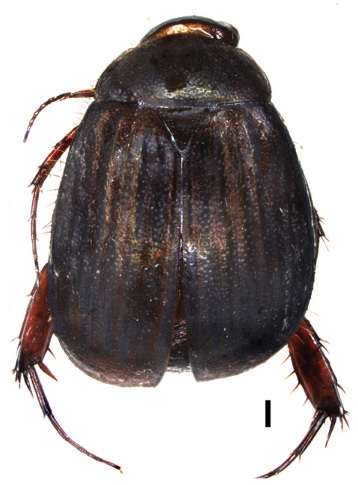

Scientific classification
- Kingdom: Animalia
- Phylum: Arthropoda
- Clade: Pancrustacea
- Class: Insecta
- Order: Coleoptera
- Suborder: Polyphaga
- Infraorder: Scarabaeiformia
- Family: Scarabaeidae
- Genus: Tetraserica
- Species: T. thainguyensis

Binomial name
- Tetraserica thainguyensis Fabrizi, Dalstein & Ahrens, 2019

= Tetraserica thainguyensis =

Species of beetle

Tetraserica thainguyensis is a species of beetle of the family Scarabaeidae. It is found in Vietnam.

== Description ==
Adults reach a length of about 7.6 mm. The surface of the labroclypeus and the disc of the frons are glabrous. The smooth area anterior to the eye is twice as wide as long.

== Etymology ==
The species is named with reference to its occurrence close to Thainguyen.
