= Tetraserica hilaris =

Scientific classification
- Kingdom: Animalia
- Phylum: Arthropoda
- Class: Insecta
- Order: Coleoptera
- Suborder: Polyphaga
- Infraorder: Scarabaeiformia
- Family: Scarabaeidae
- Genus: Tetraserica
- Species: T. hilaris

Binomial name
- Tetraserica hilaris Ahrens & Fabrizi, 2009

Species of beetle

Tetraserica hilaris is a species of beetle of the family Scarabaeidae. It is found in India (Arunachal Pradesh).

== Description ==
Adults reach a length of about 7.3 mm. They have a reddish brown, oval body. The antennae are yellowish. The dorsal surface is mostly dull and very sparsely setose.

== Etymology ==
The species name is derived from Latin hilaris (meaning bright or cheerful).
