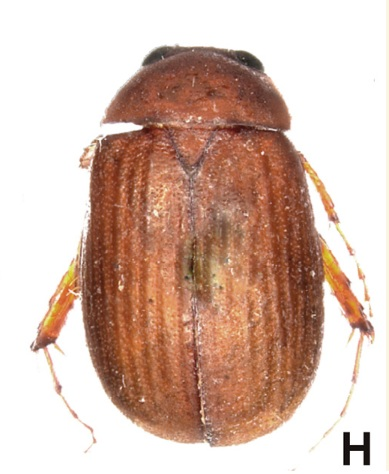

Scientific classification
- Kingdom: Animalia
- Phylum: Arthropoda
- Clade: Pancrustacea
- Class: Insecta
- Order: Coleoptera
- Suborder: Polyphaga
- Infraorder: Scarabaeiformia
- Family: Scarabaeidae
- Genus: Tetraserica
- Species: T. leishanica

Binomial name
- Tetraserica leishanica Liu, Fabrizi, Bai, Yang & Ahrens, 2014

= Tetraserica leishanica =

Species of beetle

Tetraserica leishanica is a species of beetle of the family Scarabaeidae. It is found in China (Anhui, Guangdong, Guangxi, Guizhou).

== Description ==
Adults reach a length of about 6.8–7.7 mm. The labroclypeus surface has a few erect setae and the disc of the frons has a few single setae. The smooth area in front of the eye is approximately four times as wide as long.

== Etymology ==
The species is named after its type locality, Leishan.
