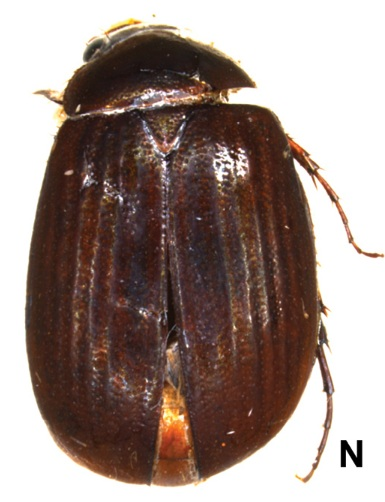

Scientific classification
- Kingdom: Animalia
- Phylum: Arthropoda
- Clade: Pancrustacea
- Class: Insecta
- Order: Coleoptera
- Suborder: Polyphaga
- Infraorder: Scarabaeiformia
- Family: Scarabaeidae
- Genus: Tetraserica
- Species: T. sculptilis

Binomial name
- Tetraserica sculptilis Liu, Fabrizi, Bai, Yang & Ahrens, 2014

= Tetraserica sculptilis =

Species of beetle

Tetraserica sculptilis is a species of beetle of the family Scarabaeidae. It is found in China (Hubei, Yunnan) and northern Vietnam.

== Description ==
Adults reach a length of about 9.1–9.8 mm. The surface of the labroclypeus and the disc of the frons are glabrous. The smooth area anterior to the eye is twice as wide as long.

== Etymology ==
The species name is derived from Latin sculptilis (meaning modelled or sculptured) and refers to the shape of the aedeagus.
