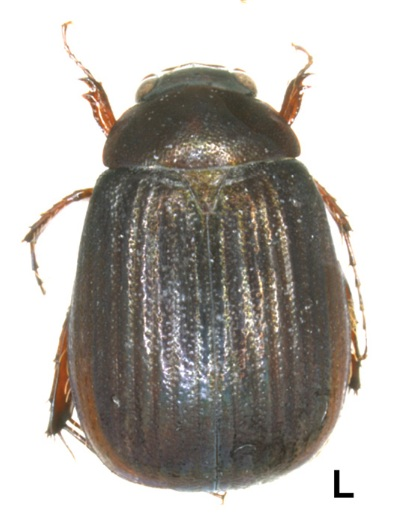

Scientific classification
- Kingdom: Animalia
- Phylum: Arthropoda
- Clade: Pancrustacea
- Class: Insecta
- Order: Coleoptera
- Suborder: Polyphaga
- Infraorder: Scarabaeiformia
- Family: Scarabaeidae
- Genus: Tetraserica
- Species: T. jinghongensis

Binomial name
- Tetraserica jinghongensis Liu, Fabrizi, Bai, Yang & Ahrens, 2014

= Tetraserica jinghongensis =

Species of beetle

Tetraserica jinghongensis is a species of beetle of the family Scarabaeidae. It is found in China (Yunnan), Myanmar and Thailand.

== Description ==
Adults reach a length of about 6.8–7.6 mm. The surface of the labroclypeus and the disc of the frons are glabrous. The smooth area anterior to the eye is twice as wide as long.

== Etymology ==
The species is named after its type locality, Jinghong Na Ban village.
