= Tetraserica quangtri =

Scientific classification
- Kingdom: Animalia
- Phylum: Arthropoda
- Class: Insecta
- Order: Coleoptera
- Suborder: Polyphaga
- Infraorder: Scarabaeiformia
- Family: Scarabaeidae
- Genus: Tetraserica
- Species: T. quangtri

Binomial name
- Tetraserica quangtri Ahrens, Pacholátko & Pham, 2025

Species of beetle

Tetraserica quangtri is a species of beetle of the family Scarabaeidae. It is found in Vietnam.

== Description ==
Adults reach a length of about 9–10.6 mm. They have an oval body. The dorsal surface is dark reddish brown and glabrous, the pronotum with a weak greenish shine. The ventral surface and the legs are reddish brown and the antennae are yellow.

== Etymology ==
The species name refers to its occurrence in Quảng Trị province.
