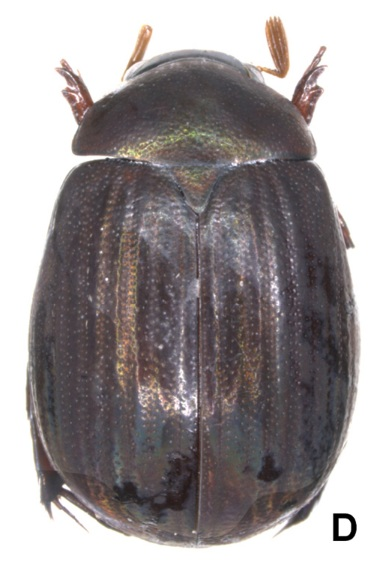

Scientific classification
- Kingdom: Animalia
- Phylum: Arthropoda
- Clade: Pancrustacea
- Class: Insecta
- Order: Coleoptera
- Suborder: Polyphaga
- Infraorder: Scarabaeiformia
- Family: Scarabaeidae
- Genus: Tetraserica
- Species: T. subrotundata

Binomial name
- Tetraserica subrotundata Fabrizi, Dalstein & Ahrens, 2019

= Tetraserica subrotundata =

Species of beetle

Tetraserica subrotundata is a species of beetle of the family Scarabaeidae. It is found in Cambodia.

== Description ==
Adults reach a length of about 7.1–8.1 mm. The surface of the labroclypeus and the disc of the frons are glabrous. The smooth area anterior to the eye is twice as wide as long.

== Etymology ==
The species name is derived from Latin sub- (meaning under) and rotundatus (meaning rounded) and refers to the shape of the medial apical phallobasal lamina of the aedeagus.
