= Tetraserica lucieae =

Scientific classification
- Kingdom: Animalia
- Phylum: Arthropoda
- Class: Insecta
- Order: Coleoptera
- Suborder: Polyphaga
- Infraorder: Scarabaeiformia
- Family: Scarabaeidae
- Genus: Tetraserica
- Species: T. lucieae

Binomial name
- Tetraserica lucieae Ahrens, Pacholátko & Pham, 2025

Species of beetle

Tetraserica lucieae is a species of beetle of the family Scarabaeidae. It is found in Thailand.

== Description ==
Adults reach a length of about 8.4–8.8 mm. They have an oval body. The dorsal surface is dark brown and glabrous, the pronotum with a weak greenish shine. The ventral surface and the legs are reddish brown and the antennae are yellow.

== Etymology ==
The species is named after a friend of one of the authors, Lucie.
