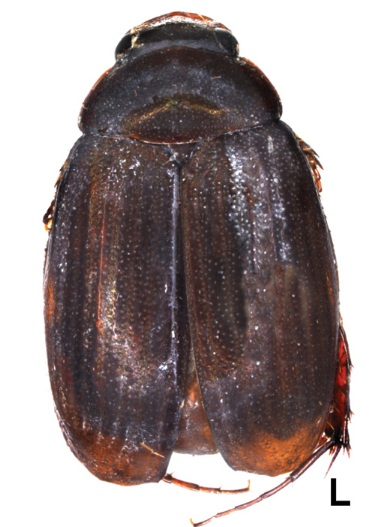

Scientific classification
- Kingdom: Animalia
- Phylum: Arthropoda
- Clade: Pancrustacea
- Class: Insecta
- Order: Coleoptera
- Suborder: Polyphaga
- Infraorder: Scarabaeiformia
- Family: Scarabaeidae
- Genus: Tetraserica
- Species: T. koi

Binomial name
- Tetraserica koi Fabrizi, Dalstein & Ahrens, 2019

= Tetraserica koi =

Species of beetle

Tetraserica koi is a species of beetle of the family Scarabaeidae. It is found in Thailand.

== Description ==
Adults reach a length of about 7–8.4 mm. The surface of the labroclypeus and the disc of the frons are glabrous. The smooth area anterior to the eye is twice as wide as long.

== Etymology ==
The species is named in honour of Prof Dr Ko, the oncologist of one of the authors and director of the Johanniter Hospital in Bonn.
