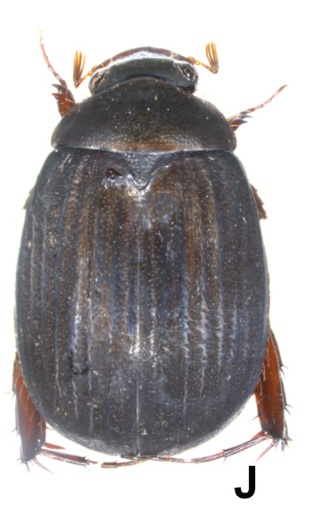

Scientific classification
- Kingdom: Animalia
- Phylum: Arthropoda
- Clade: Pancrustacea
- Class: Insecta
- Order: Coleoptera
- Suborder: Polyphaga
- Infraorder: Scarabaeiformia
- Family: Scarabaeidae
- Genus: Tetraserica
- Species: T. fikaceki

Binomial name
- Tetraserica fikaceki Liu, Fabrizi, Bai, Yang & Ahrens, 2014

= Tetraserica fikaceki =

Species of beetle

Tetraserica fikaceki is a species of beetle of the family Scarabaeidae. It is found in China (Hainan).

== Description ==
Adults reach a length of about 8–9.7 mm. The surface of the labroclypeus and the disc of the frons are glabrous. The smooth area anterior to the eye is twice as wide as long.

== Etymology ==
The species is named after one of the collectors of the type series, Martin Fikáček.
