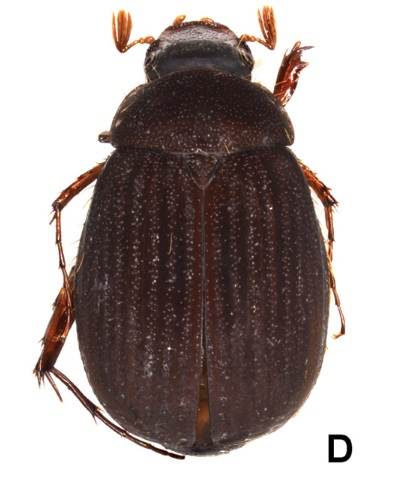

Scientific classification
- Kingdom: Animalia
- Phylum: Arthropoda
- Clade: Pancrustacea
- Class: Insecta
- Order: Coleoptera
- Suborder: Polyphaga
- Infraorder: Scarabaeiformia
- Family: Scarabaeidae
- Genus: Tetraserica
- Species: T. bansanpakiana

Binomial name
- Tetraserica bansanpakiana Fabrizi, Dalstein & Ahrens, 2019

= Tetraserica bansanpakiana =

Species of beetle

Tetraserica bansanpakiana is a species of beetle of the family Scarabaeidae. It is found in Thailand.

== Description ==
Adults reach a length of about 6.9–8.5 mm. The colour may vary from dark brown to nearly entirely yellowish brown with a dark head. The surface of the labroclypeus and the disc of the frons are glabrous. The smooth area anterior to the eye is twice as wide as long.

== Etymology ==
The species is named after the type locality, Ban San Pakia.
