= Tetraserica hornburgi =

Scientific classification
- Kingdom: Animalia
- Phylum: Arthropoda
- Class: Insecta
- Order: Coleoptera
- Suborder: Polyphaga
- Infraorder: Scarabaeiformia
- Family: Scarabaeidae
- Genus: Tetraserica
- Species: T. hornburgi

Binomial name
- Tetraserica hornburgi Ahrens, 2023

Species of beetle

Tetraserica hornburgi is a species of beetle of the family Scarabaeidae. It is found in Myanmar.

== Description ==
Adults reach a length of about 7.7 mm. The dorsal surface is dark brown and glabrous, while the ventral surface and legs are reddish brown and the antennae are yellow.

== Etymology ==
The species is named after its collector, Michael Hornburg.
