= Tetraserica yongbelar =

Scientific classification
- Kingdom: Animalia
- Phylum: Arthropoda
- Class: Insecta
- Order: Coleoptera
- Suborder: Polyphaga
- Infraorder: Scarabaeiformia
- Family: Scarabaeidae
- Genus: Tetraserica
- Species: T. yongbelar

Binomial name
- Tetraserica yongbelar Ahrens, 2023

Species of beetle

Tetraserica yongbelar is a species of beetle of the family Scarabaeidae. It is found in Malaysia.

== Description ==
Adults reach a length of about 9.9 mm. The dorsal surface is dark brown and glabrous, while the ventral surface is reddish brown and the antennae are yellow.

== Etymology ==
The species is named after its type locality, Yong Belar.
