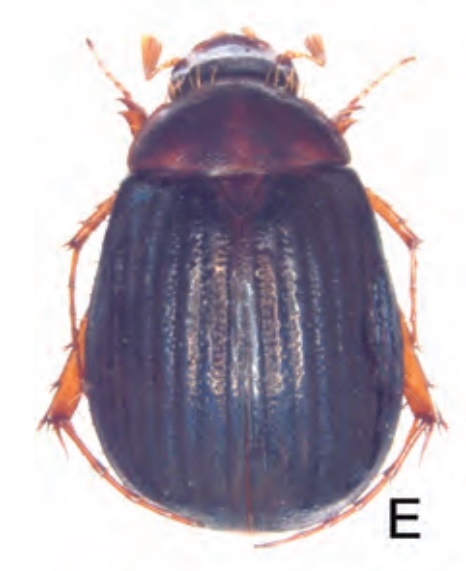

Scientific classification
- Kingdom: Animalia
- Phylum: Arthropoda
- Class: Insecta
- Order: Coleoptera
- Suborder: Polyphaga
- Infraorder: Scarabaeiformia
- Family: Scarabaeidae
- Genus: Tetraserica
- Species: T. rufimargo

Binomial name
- Tetraserica rufimargo Ahrens & Fabrizi, 2016

= Tetraserica rufimargo =

Species of beetle

Tetraserica rufimargo is a species of beetle of the family Scarabaeidae. It is found in India (Meghalaya).

== Description ==
Adults reach a length of about 6.9–8 mm. They have a dark brown, oval body. The ventral surface and lateral margins of the pronotum are reddish brown, while the legs and antennae are yellowish brown. The dorsal surface is dull and glabrous.

== Etymology ==
The species name is derived from Latin rufus (meaning red) and margo (meaning margin) and refers to the reddish margin of the pronotum.
