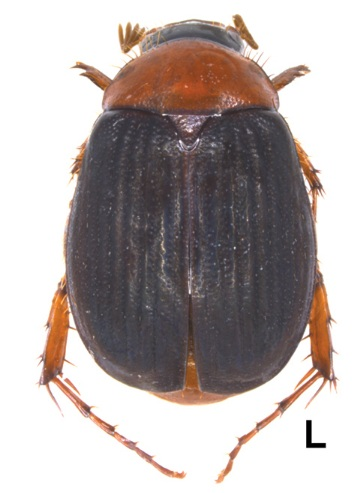

Scientific classification
- Kingdom: Animalia
- Phylum: Arthropoda
- Clade: Pancrustacea
- Class: Insecta
- Order: Coleoptera
- Suborder: Polyphaga
- Infraorder: Scarabaeiformia
- Family: Scarabaeidae
- Genus: Tetraserica
- Species: T. rubrithorax

Binomial name
- Tetraserica rubrithorax Fabrizi, Dalstein & Ahrens, 2019

= Tetraserica rubrithorax =

Species of beetle

Tetraserica rubrithorax is a species of beetle of the family Scarabaeidae. It is found in Myanmar.

== Description ==
Adults reach a length of about 6.9 mm. The body is blackish brown with the pronotum reddish. The surface of the labroclypeus and the disc of the frons are glabrous. The smooth area anterior to the eye is twice as wide as long.

== Etymology ==
The species name is derived from Latin rubus (meaning red) and thorax and refers to the red pronotum of the species.
