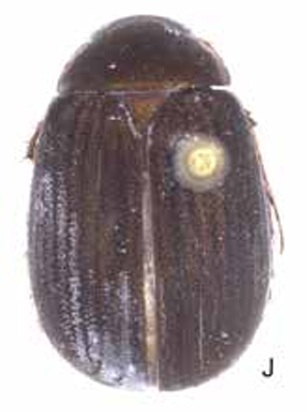

Scientific classification
- Kingdom: Animalia
- Phylum: Arthropoda
- Class: Insecta
- Order: Coleoptera
- Suborder: Polyphaga
- Infraorder: Scarabaeiformia
- Family: Scarabaeidae
- Genus: Tetraserica
- Species: T. qifengshanensis

Binomial name
- Tetraserica qifengshanensis Ahrens, 2021

= Tetraserica qifengshanensis =

Species of beetle

Tetraserica qifengshanensis is a species of beetle of the family Scarabaeidae. It is found in China (Guangdong).

== Description ==
Adults reach a length of about 8–8.7 mm. The surface of the labroclypeus and the disc of the frons are glabrous. The smooth area anterior to the eye is twice as wide as long.

== Etymology ==
The species is named after the type locality, Qifeng Shan.
