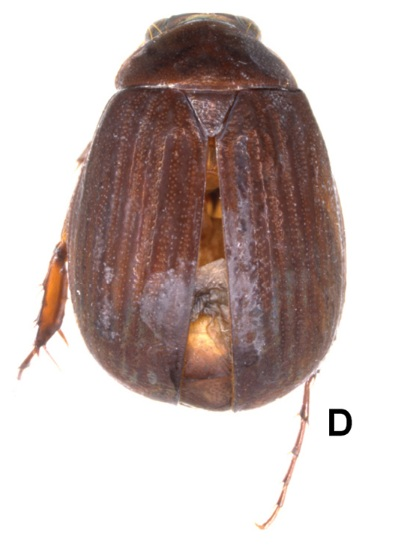

Scientific classification
- Kingdom: Animalia
- Phylum: Arthropoda
- Clade: Pancrustacea
- Class: Insecta
- Order: Coleoptera
- Suborder: Polyphaga
- Infraorder: Scarabaeiformia
- Family: Scarabaeidae
- Genus: Tetraserica
- Species: T. maerimensis

Binomial name
- Tetraserica maerimensis Kobayashi, 2018

= Tetraserica maerimensis =

Species of beetle

Tetraserica maerimensis is a species of beetle of the family Scarabaeidae. It is found in Thailand.
