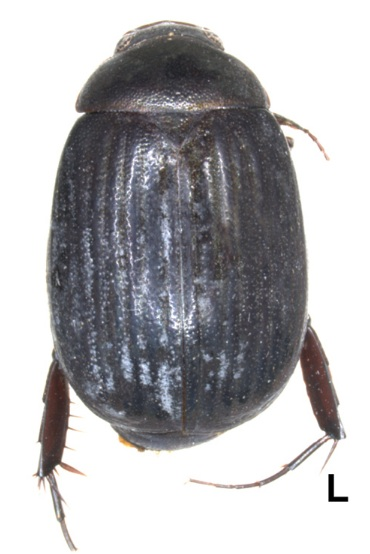

Scientific classification
- Kingdom: Animalia
- Phylum: Arthropoda
- Clade: Pancrustacea
- Class: Insecta
- Order: Coleoptera
- Suborder: Polyphaga
- Infraorder: Scarabaeiformia
- Family: Scarabaeidae
- Genus: Tetraserica
- Species: T. wapiensis

Binomial name
- Tetraserica wapiensis (Frey, 1972)

Synonyms
- Neoserica wapiensis Frey, 1972

= Tetraserica wapiensis =

Species of beetle

Tetraserica wapiensis is a species of beetle of the family Scarabaeidae. It is found in Laos, Thailand and Vietnam.

== Description ==
Adults reach a length of about 7.5 mm. The surface of the labroclypeus and the disc of the frons are glabrous. The smooth area anterior to the eye is twice as wide as long.
