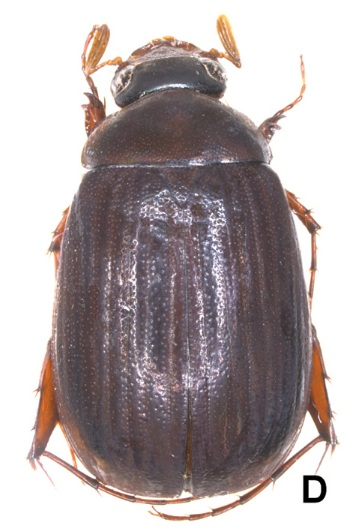

Scientific classification
- Kingdom: Animalia
- Phylum: Arthropoda
- Clade: Pancrustacea
- Class: Insecta
- Order: Coleoptera
- Suborder: Polyphaga
- Infraorder: Scarabaeiformia
- Family: Scarabaeidae
- Genus: Tetraserica
- Species: T. angkhangensis

Binomial name
- Tetraserica angkhangensis Kobayashi, 2017

= Tetraserica angkhangensis =

Species of beetle

Tetraserica angkhangensis is a species of beetle of the family Scarabaeidae. It is found in Myanmar and Thailand.
