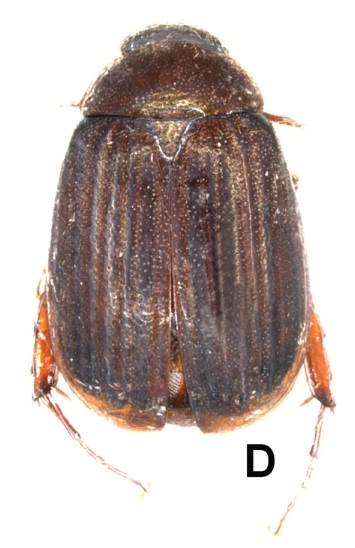

Scientific classification
- Kingdom: Animalia
- Phylum: Arthropoda
- Clade: Pancrustacea
- Class: Insecta
- Order: Coleoptera
- Suborder: Polyphaga
- Infraorder: Scarabaeiformia
- Family: Scarabaeidae
- Genus: Tetraserica
- Species: T. sigulianshanica

Binomial name
- Tetraserica sigulianshanica Liu, Fabrizi, Bai, Yang & Ahrens, 2014

= Tetraserica sigulianshanica =

Species of beetle

Tetraserica sigulianshanica is a species of beetle of the family Scarabaeidae. It is found in China (Chongqing, Gansu, Shaanxi, Sichuan).

== Description ==
Adults reach a length of about 6.6–7.6 mm. The surface of the labroclypeus and the disc of the frons are glabrous. The smooth area anterior to the eye is twice as wide as long.

== Etymology ==
The species is named after its type locality, Sigulian Shan.
