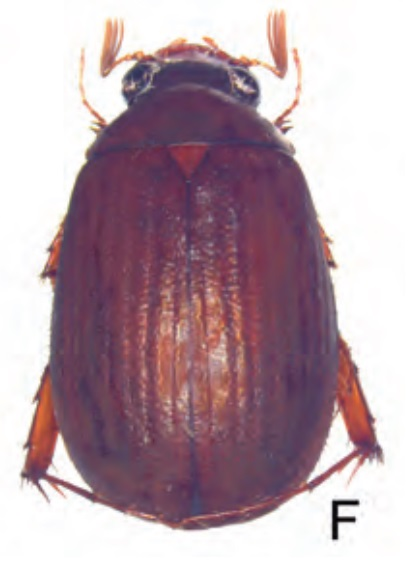

Scientific classification
- Kingdom: Animalia
- Phylum: Arthropoda
- Class: Insecta
- Order: Coleoptera
- Suborder: Polyphaga
- Infraorder: Scarabaeiformia
- Family: Scarabaeidae
- Genus: Tetraserica
- Species: T. uncinata

Binomial name
- Tetraserica uncinata Ahrens & Fabrizi, 2016

= Tetraserica uncinata =

Species of beetle

Tetraserica uncinata is a species of beetle of the family Scarabaeidae. It is found in India (Meghalaya).

== Description ==
Adults reach a length of about 8.4–9.4 mm. They have a reddish brown, oval body. The legs and ventral surface are somewhat lighter and the antennae are yellowish brown. The dorsal surface is dull and glabrous.

== Etymology ==
The species name is derived from Latin uncinatus (meaning hooked) and refers to the shape of the dorsal lobe of the left paramere.
