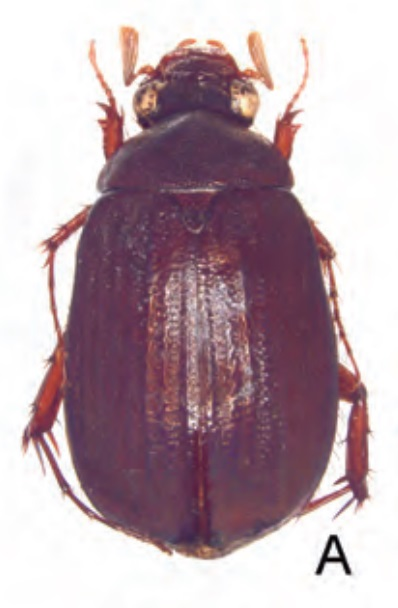

Scientific classification
- Kingdom: Animalia
- Phylum: Arthropoda
- Class: Insecta
- Order: Coleoptera
- Suborder: Polyphaga
- Infraorder: Scarabaeiformia
- Family: Scarabaeidae
- Genus: Tetraserica
- Species: T. bendai

Binomial name
- Tetraserica bendai Ahrens & Fabrizi, 2016

= Tetraserica bendai =

Species of beetle

Tetraserica bendai is a species of beetle of the family Scarabaeidae. It is found in India (Meghalaya).

== Description ==
Adults reach a length of about 9.3–10 mm. They have a dark brown, oval body. The ventral surface is reddish brown, the antennae are yellowish brown and the dorsal surface is dull and glabrous.

== Etymology ==
The species is named after one of its collectors, P. Benda.
