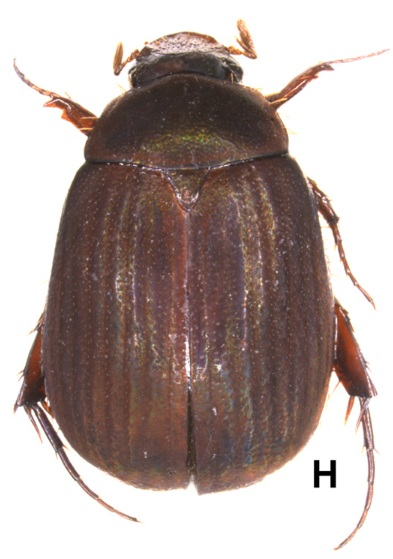

Scientific classification
- Kingdom: Animalia
- Phylum: Arthropoda
- Clade: Pancrustacea
- Class: Insecta
- Order: Coleoptera
- Suborder: Polyphaga
- Infraorder: Scarabaeiformia
- Family: Scarabaeidae
- Genus: Tetraserica
- Species: T. matsumotoi

Binomial name
- Tetraserica matsumotoi Kobayashi, 2017

= Tetraserica matsumotoi =

Species of beetle

Tetraserica matsumotoi is a species of beetle of the family Scarabaeidae. It is found in Thailand.
