= Tetraserica fabriziae =

Scientific classification
- Kingdom: Animalia
- Phylum: Arthropoda
- Class: Insecta
- Order: Coleoptera
- Suborder: Polyphaga
- Infraorder: Scarabaeiformia
- Family: Scarabaeidae
- Genus: Tetraserica
- Species: T. fabriziae

Binomial name
- Tetraserica fabriziae Liu, Li & Ahrens, 2023

Species of beetle

Tetraserica fabriziae is a species of beetle of the family Scarabaeidae. It is found in China (Yunnan).

== Description ==
Adults reach a length of about 8.1–8.5 mm. They have a dark reddish brown, oval body. The dorsal surface is shiny and glabrous.

== Etymology ==
The species is dedicated to Silvia Fabrizi.
