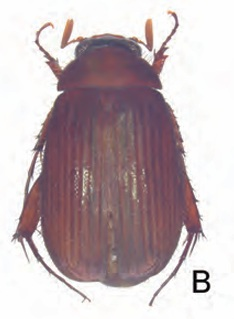

Scientific classification
- Kingdom: Animalia
- Phylum: Arthropoda
- Class: Insecta
- Order: Coleoptera
- Suborder: Polyphaga
- Infraorder: Scarabaeiformia
- Family: Scarabaeidae
- Genus: Maladera
- Species: M. subabbreviata

Binomial name
- Maladera subabbreviata Ahrens & Fabrizi, 2016

= Maladera subabbreviata =

Species of beetle

Maladera subabbreviata is a species of beetle of the family Scarabaeidae. It is found in India (Assam, Meghalaya).

== Description ==
Adults reach a length of about 10.4 mm. They have a dark reddish-brown, oblong-oval body, with yellowish antennae. The dorsal surface is mostly dull and glabrous, except for a few short setae on the sides of the elytra.

== Etymology ==
The species name is derived from Latin sub– (meaning under) and abbreviatus (meaning shortened) and refers to the, compared to Maladera hongkongica, shortened left paramere.
