= Neoserica allosigillata =

Scientific classification
- Kingdom: Animalia
- Phylum: Arthropoda
- Class: Insecta
- Order: Coleoptera
- Suborder: Polyphaga
- Infraorder: Scarabaeiformia
- Family: Scarabaeidae
- Genus: Neoserica
- Species: N. allosigillata

Binomial name
- Neoserica allosigillata Ahrens & Pham, 2021

Species of beetle

Neoserica allosigillata is a species of beetle of the family Scarabaeidae. It is found in Vietnam.

== Description ==
Adults reach a length of about 5.1–6.1 mm. They have a reddish brown, oval body. The antennal club and ventral surface are yellowish. The dorsal surface is mostly dull and nearly glabrous.

== Etymology ==
The species name is derived from Greek allo- (meaning different) and the species name sigillata and refers to the similar shape of the parameres of Neoserica sigillata.
