= Maladera filigraniforceps =

Scientific classification
- Kingdom: Animalia
- Phylum: Arthropoda
- Class: Insecta
- Order: Coleoptera
- Suborder: Polyphaga
- Infraorder: Scarabaeiformia
- Family: Scarabaeidae
- Genus: Maladera
- Species: M. filigraniforceps

Binomial name
- Maladera filigraniforceps Ahrens, Fabrizi & Liu, 2021

Species of beetle

Maladera filigraniforceps is a species of beetle of the family Scarabaeidae. It is found in China (Fujian, Guangdong, Hubei, Hunan, Jiangsu, Sichuan), Laos and Vietnam.

== Description ==
Adults reach a length of about 8.9–10.6 mm. They have a reddish brown, oblong body. The antennae are yellow and the dorsal surface is shiny and almost glabrous.

== Etymology ==
The species name is derived from Latin iligranus (meaning narrow) and forceps (meaning pins) and refers to the long, filigranous shape of the parameres.
