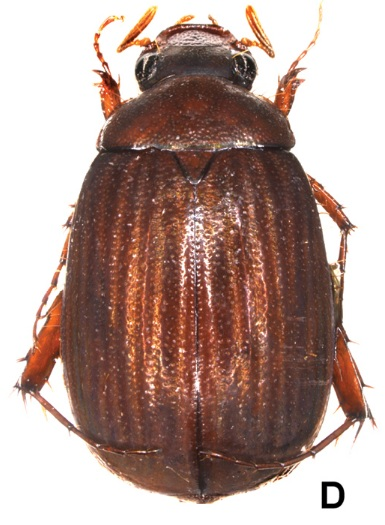

Scientific classification
- Kingdom: Animalia
- Phylum: Arthropoda
- Clade: Pancrustacea
- Class: Insecta
- Order: Coleoptera
- Suborder: Polyphaga
- Infraorder: Scarabaeiformia
- Family: Scarabaeidae
- Genus: Tetraserica
- Species: T. trilobiforceps

Binomial name
- Tetraserica trilobiforceps Fabrizi, Dalstein & Ahrens, 2019

= Tetraserica trilobiforceps =

Species of beetle

Tetraserica trilobiforceps is a species of beetle of the family Scarabaeidae. It is found in Laos.

== Description ==
Adults reach a length of about 8.3–8.9 mm. The surface of the labroclypeus and the disc of the frons are glabrous. The smooth area anterior to the eye is twice as wide as long.

== Etymology ==
The species name is derived from Latin words tri- (meaning three times), lobatus (meaning lobed) and forceps and refers to the shape of the left paramere.
