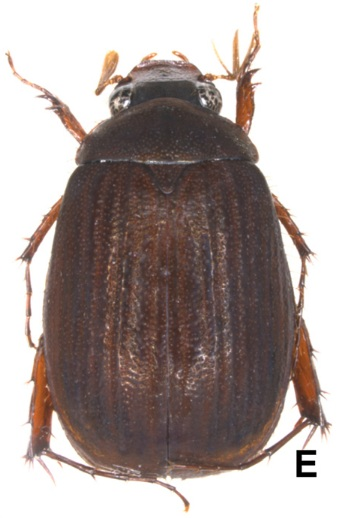

Scientific classification
- Kingdom: Animalia
- Phylum: Arthropoda
- Clade: Pancrustacea
- Class: Insecta
- Order: Coleoptera
- Suborder: Polyphaga
- Infraorder: Scarabaeiformia
- Family: Scarabaeidae
- Genus: Tetraserica
- Species: T. finociliata

Binomial name
- Tetraserica finociliata Fabrizi, Dalstein & Ahrens, 2019

= Tetraserica finociliata =

Species of beetle

Tetraserica finociliata is a species of beetle of the family Scarabaeidae. It is found in Myanmar.

== Description ==
Adults reach a length of about 8.9–10.2 mm. The surface of the labroclypeus and disc of the frons is glabrous. The smooth area anterior to the eye is twice as wide as long.

== Etymology ==
The species name is derived from the combined Latin words fino- (meaning fine) and ciliatus (meaning ciliate) and refers to the fine comp of trichomes at the base of the right paramere.
