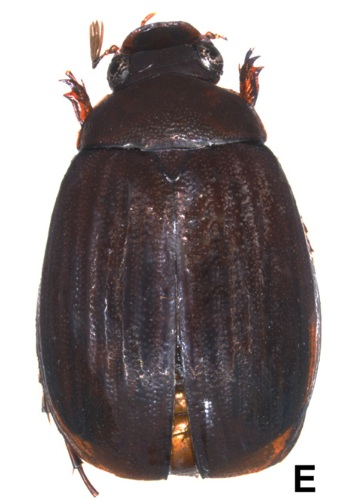

Scientific classification
- Kingdom: Animalia
- Phylum: Arthropoda
- Clade: Pancrustacea
- Class: Insecta
- Order: Coleoptera
- Suborder: Polyphaga
- Infraorder: Scarabaeiformia
- Family: Scarabaeidae
- Genus: Tetraserica
- Species: T. quadriforceps

Binomial name
- Tetraserica quadriforceps Fabrizi, Dalstein & Ahrens, 2019

= Tetraserica quadriforceps =

Species of beetle

Tetraserica quadriforceps is a species of beetle of the family Scarabaeidae. It is found in Vietnam.

== Description ==
Adults reach a length of about 8–9.9 mm. The surface of the labroclypeus and the disc of the frons are glabrous. The smooth area anterior to the eye is twice as wide as long.

== Etymology ==
The species name is derived from Latin quadri (meaning four) and forceps and refers to the four branches of the parameres.
