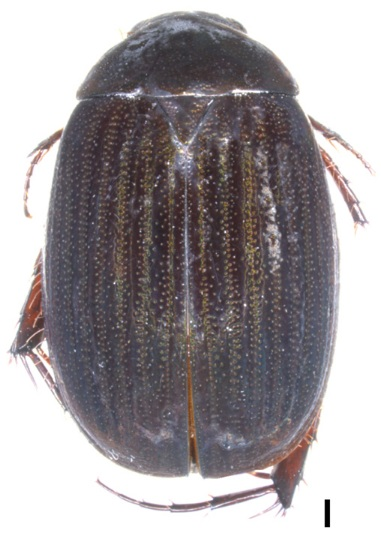

Scientific classification
- Kingdom: Animalia
- Phylum: Arthropoda
- Clade: Pancrustacea
- Class: Insecta
- Order: Coleoptera
- Suborder: Polyphaga
- Infraorder: Scarabaeiformia
- Family: Scarabaeidae
- Genus: Tetraserica
- Species: T. veliformis

Binomial name
- Tetraserica veliformis Fabrizi, Dalstein & Ahrens, 2019

= Tetraserica veliformis =

Species of beetle

Tetraserica veliformis is a species of beetle of the family Scarabaeidae. It is found in Thailand.

== Description ==
Adults reach a length of about 8.8–10.1 mm. The surface of the labroclypeus and the disc of the frons are glabrous. The smooth area anterior to the eye is twice as wide as long.

== Etymology ==
The species name is derived from Latin velum (meaning sail) and formis (meaning in shape) and refers to the large triangle-shaped tooth of the left paramere.
