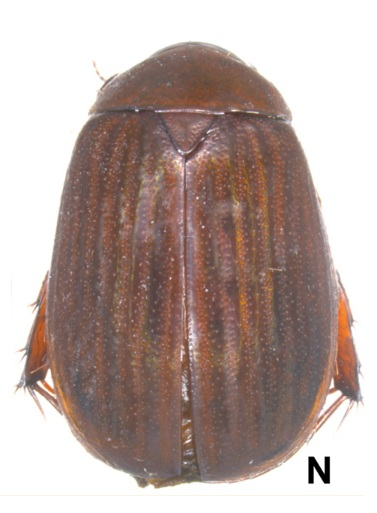

Scientific classification
- Kingdom: Animalia
- Phylum: Arthropoda
- Clade: Pancrustacea
- Class: Insecta
- Order: Coleoptera
- Suborder: Polyphaga
- Infraorder: Scarabaeiformia
- Family: Scarabaeidae
- Genus: Tetraserica
- Species: T. neouncinata

Binomial name
- Tetraserica neouncinata Fabrizi, Dalstein & Ahrens, 2019

= Tetraserica neouncinata =

Species of beetle

Tetraserica neouncinata is a species of beetle of the family Scarabaeidae. It is found in Laos and Myanmar.

== Description ==
Adults reach a length of about 8.8–9.8 mm. The surface of the labroclypeus and the disc of the frons are glabrous. The smooth area anterior to the eye is twice as wide as long.

== Etymology ==
The species name is derived from the combined Greek word neo- (meaning new) and the Latin word uncinatus and refers to the uncinated shape of the right paramere.
