= Gynaecoserica obliqua =

Scientific classification
- Kingdom: Animalia
- Phylum: Arthropoda
- Class: Insecta
- Order: Coleoptera
- Suborder: Polyphaga
- Infraorder: Scarabaeiformia
- Family: Scarabaeidae
- Genus: Gynaecoserica
- Species: G. obliqua

Binomial name
- Gynaecoserica obliqua Ahrens & Fabrizi, 2009

Species of beetle

Gynaecoserica obliqua is a species of beetle of the family Scarabaeidae. It is found in China (Yunnan).

== Description ==
Adults reach a length of about 5–6 mm. They have a reddish brown, oblong body, the dorsal surface with dark irregular spots. The antennae are yellowish brown. The dorsal surface is dull and moderately densely setose.

== Etymology ==
The species name is derived from Latin obliquus (meaning oblique) and refers to the oblique shape of the parameres.
