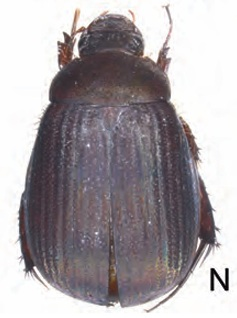

Scientific classification
- Kingdom: Animalia
- Phylum: Arthropoda
- Class: Insecta
- Order: Coleoptera
- Suborder: Polyphaga
- Infraorder: Scarabaeiformia
- Family: Scarabaeidae
- Genus: Maladera
- Species: M. pseudohongkongica

Binomial name
- Maladera pseudohongkongica Ahrens & Fabrizi, 2016

= Maladera pseudohongkongica =

Species of beetle

Maladera pseudohongkongica is a species of beetle of the family Scarabaeidae. It is found in Bangladesh, India (Assam, Jharkhand, Meghalaya, Nagaland, Tripura, Arunachal Pradesh), Myanmar, Thailand and China (Yunnan).

== Description ==
Adults reach a length of about 10.2–12.2 mm. They have a dark brown, oblong-oval body, with yellowish antennae. The dorsal surface is mostly dull and glabrous, except for a few short setae on the sides of the elytra.

== Etymology ==
The species name is derived from the combined Greek prefix pseudo (meaning false) and the species name hongkongica and refers to the high similarity with Maladera hongkongica.
