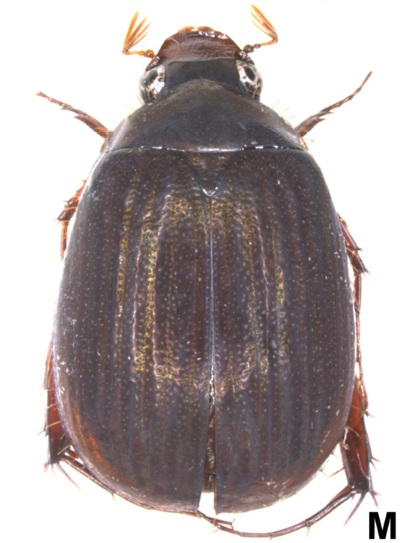

Scientific classification
- Kingdom: Animalia
- Phylum: Arthropoda
- Clade: Pancrustacea
- Class: Insecta
- Order: Coleoptera
- Suborder: Polyphaga
- Infraorder: Scarabaeiformia
- Family: Scarabaeidae
- Genus: Tetraserica
- Species: T. quadrifurcata

Binomial name
- Tetraserica quadrifurcata Fabrizi, Dalstein & Ahrens, 2019

= Tetraserica quadrifurcata =

Species of beetle

Tetraserica quadrifurcata is a species of beetle of the family Scarabaeidae. It is found in Cambodia.

== Description ==
Adults reach a length of about 8.9–9.8 mm. The surface of the labroclypeus and the disc of the frons are glabrous. The smooth area anterior to the eye is twice as wide as long.

== Etymology ==
The species name is derived from Latin quadri (meaning four) and furcata (meaning forked) and refers to the shape of doubly bifurcate parameres.
