= Serica longidentata =

Scientific classification
- Kingdom: Animalia
- Phylum: Arthropoda
- Class: Insecta
- Order: Coleoptera
- Suborder: Polyphaga
- Infraorder: Scarabaeiformia
- Family: Scarabaeidae
- Genus: Serica
- Species: S. longidentata

Binomial name
- Serica longidentata Zhao & Ahrens, 2023

Species of beetle

Serica longidentata is a species of beetle of the family Scarabaeidae. It is found in China (Guangdong, Hunan).

== Description ==
Adults reach a length of about 10.2–11.9 mm. They have a dark brown, elongated ovoid body. The pronotum and elytra have a darker pattern and a strong coppery luster. The labroclypeus is dark green, the legs reddish brown, and the antennae yellowish brown.

== Etymology ==
The species name is derived from Latin longi and dentatus and refers to the carinated preapical tooth of the right paramere.
