= Gynaecoserica pseudocymosa =

Scientific classification
- Kingdom: Animalia
- Phylum: Arthropoda
- Class: Insecta
- Order: Coleoptera
- Suborder: Polyphaga
- Infraorder: Scarabaeiformia
- Family: Scarabaeidae
- Genus: Gynaecoserica
- Species: G. pseudocymosa

Binomial name
- Gynaecoserica pseudocymosa Ahrens, 2021

Species of beetle

Gynaecoserica pseudocymosa is a species of beetle of the family Scarabaeidae. It is found in Thailand.

== Description ==
Adults reach a length of about 4.1 mm. They have an oblong body. The dorsal surface is yellowish brown, with the anterior half of the pronotum brown, the margins of the elytra black, the frons dark greenish brown and the antennae and legs yellow. Except for the shiny head, the dorsal surface is dull and sparsely setose.

== Etymology ==
The species name is derived from Greek pseudo (meaning nearly) and the species name cymosa and refers to its similarity in external appearance with Gynaecoserica cymosa.
