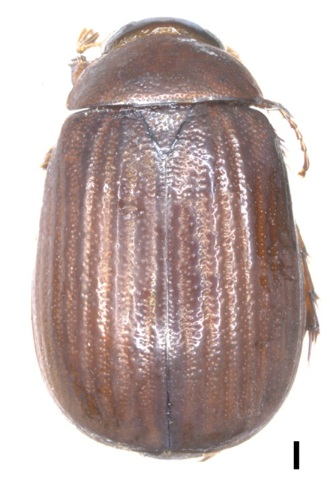

Scientific classification
- Kingdom: Animalia
- Phylum: Arthropoda
- Clade: Pancrustacea
- Class: Insecta
- Order: Coleoptera
- Suborder: Polyphaga
- Infraorder: Scarabaeiformia
- Family: Scarabaeidae
- Genus: Tetraserica
- Species: T. filiforceps

Binomial name
- Tetraserica filiforceps Fabrizi, Dalstein & Ahrens, 2019

= Tetraserica filiforceps =

Species of beetle

Tetraserica filiforceps is a species of beetle of the family Scarabaeidae. It is found in Laos and Vietnam.

== Description ==
Adults reach a length of about 9.1–9.2 mm. The surface of the labroclypeus and the disc of the frons are glabrous. The smooth area anterior to the eye is twice as wide as long.

== Etymology ==
The species name is derived from Latin filum (meaning string or filament) and forceps and refers to the filiform parameres.
