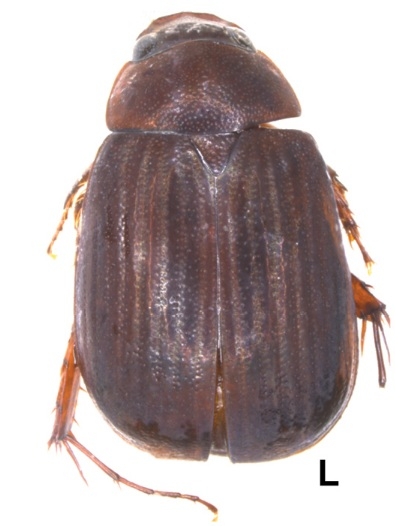

Scientific classification
- Kingdom: Animalia
- Phylum: Arthropoda
- Clade: Pancrustacea
- Class: Insecta
- Order: Coleoptera
- Suborder: Polyphaga
- Infraorder: Scarabaeiformia
- Family: Scarabaeidae
- Genus: Tetraserica
- Species: T. infida

Binomial name
- Tetraserica infida Fabrizi, Dalstein & Ahrens, 2019

= Tetraserica infida =

Species of beetle

Tetraserica infida is a species of beetle of the family Scarabaeidae. It is found in Myanmar.

== Description ==
Adults reach a length of about 7.3–8.1 mm. The surface of the labroclypeus and the disc of the frons are glabrous. The smooth area anterior to the eye is twice as wide as long.

== Etymology ==
The species name is derived from Latin in- (meaning non-) and fidus (meaning split) and refers to its unsplit left paramere.
