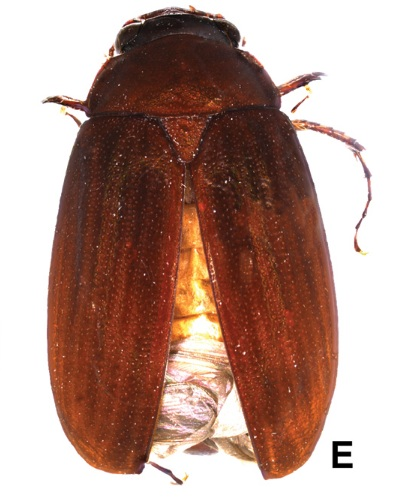

Scientific classification
- Kingdom: Animalia
- Phylum: Arthropoda
- Clade: Pancrustacea
- Class: Insecta
- Order: Coleoptera
- Suborder: Polyphaga
- Infraorder: Scarabaeiformia
- Family: Scarabaeidae
- Genus: Tetraserica
- Species: T. appendiculata

Binomial name
- Tetraserica appendiculata Fabrizi, Dalstein & Ahrens, 2019

= Tetraserica appendiculata =

Species of beetle

Tetraserica appendiculata is a species of beetle of the family Scarabaeidae. It is found in Laos.

== Description ==
Adults reach a length of about 7.8–8.8 mm. The surface of the labroclypeus and the disc of the frons are glabrous. The smooth area anterior to the eye is twice as wide as long.

== Etymology ==
The species name is derived from Latin appendiculus (meaning small appendage) and refers to the small appendix of the paramere.
