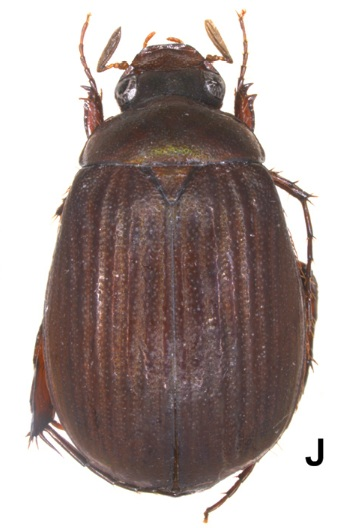

Scientific classification
- Kingdom: Animalia
- Phylum: Arthropoda
- Clade: Pancrustacea
- Class: Insecta
- Order: Coleoptera
- Suborder: Polyphaga
- Infraorder: Scarabaeiformia
- Family: Scarabaeidae
- Genus: Tetraserica
- Species: T. falciformis

Binomial name
- Tetraserica falciformis Fabrizi, Dalstein & Ahrens, 2019

= Tetraserica falciformis =

Species of beetle

Tetraserica falciformis is a species of beetle of the family Scarabaeidae. It is found in Laos and Vietnam.

== Description ==
Adults reach a length of about 11.8–12.5 mm. The surface of the labroclypeus and the disc of the frons are glabrous. The smooth area anterior to the eye is twice as wide as long.

== Etymology ==
The species name is derived from the combined Latin words falcis- (meaning sickle) and formis (meaning of shape) and refers to the sickle-shaped right paramere.
