= Gynaecoserica exilis =

Scientific classification
- Kingdom: Animalia
- Phylum: Arthropoda
- Class: Insecta
- Order: Coleoptera
- Suborder: Polyphaga
- Infraorder: Scarabaeiformia
- Family: Scarabaeidae
- Genus: Gynaecoserica
- Species: G. exilis

Binomial name
- Gynaecoserica exilis Ahrens & Fabrizi, 2009

Species of beetle

Gynaecoserica exilis is a species of beetle of the family Scarabaeidae. It is found in India (Arunachal Pradesh).

== Description ==
Adults reach a length of about 5.5–5.8 mm. They have an oblong body. The dorsal surface is yellowish brown with numerous small dark brown dots on the pronotum and elytra. There is a large blackish spot on each elytron, and the frons and pronotum have a greenish iridescent shine. The antennae and legs are yellowish brown. The dorsal surface is dull and sparsely setose.

== Etymology ==
The species name is derived from Latin exilis (meaning small or meagre) and refers to the very short parameres.
