= Serica falcifera =

Scientific classification
- Kingdom: Animalia
- Phylum: Arthropoda
- Class: Insecta
- Order: Coleoptera
- Suborder: Polyphaga
- Infraorder: Scarabaeiformia
- Family: Scarabaeidae
- Genus: Serica
- Species: S. falcifera

Binomial name
- Serica falcifera Ahrens & Fabrizi, 2009

Species of beetle

Serica falcifera is a species of beetle of the family Scarabaeidae. It is found in India (Arunachal Pradesh).

== Description ==
Adults reach a length of about 10.4–10.5 mm. They have a dark brown, oval body. The antennae are yellowish brown and the legs are reddish brown. The dorsal surface is mostly dull and the head is sparsely setose, while the dorsal surface of the pronotum and elytra is glabrous.

== Etymology ==
The species name is derived from Latin falcifera and refers to the sickle-like dorsal lobe of the left paramere.
