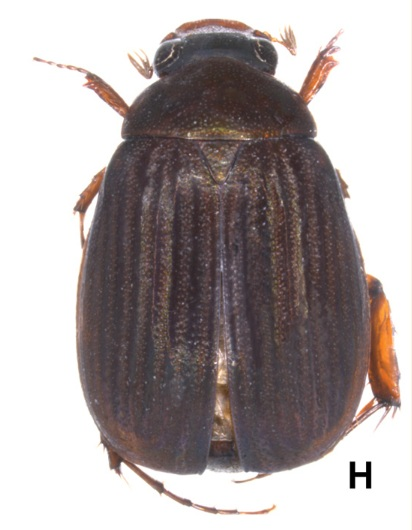

Scientific classification
- Kingdom: Animalia
- Phylum: Arthropoda
- Clade: Pancrustacea
- Class: Insecta
- Order: Coleoptera
- Suborder: Polyphaga
- Infraorder: Scarabaeiformia
- Family: Scarabaeidae
- Genus: Tetraserica
- Species: T. pluriuncinata

Binomial name
- Tetraserica pluriuncinata Fabrizi, Dalstein & Ahrens, 2019

= Tetraserica pluriuncinata =

Species of beetle

Tetraserica pluriuncinata is a species of beetle of the family Scarabaeidae. It is found in Thailand.

== Description ==
Adults reach a length of about 7.6 mm. The surface of the labroclypeus and the disc of the frons are glabrous. The smooth area anterior to the eye is twice as wide as long.

== Etymology ==
The species name is derived from Greek pluris (meaning higher) and Latin uncinatus (meaning hooked) and refers to the pluri-hooked shape of the right paramere.
