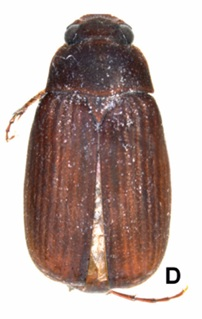

Scientific classification
- Kingdom: Animalia
- Phylum: Arthropoda
- Class: Insecta
- Order: Coleoptera
- Suborder: Polyphaga
- Infraorder: Scarabaeiformia
- Family: Scarabaeidae
- Genus: Neoserica
- Species: N. pariliforceps

Binomial name
- Neoserica pariliforceps Ahrens, Fabrizi & Liu, 2019

= Neoserica pariliforceps =

Species of beetle

Neoserica pariliforceps is a species of beetle of the family Scarabaeidae. It is found in China (Guizhou, Shaanxi, Yunnan).

== Description ==
Adults reach a length of about 9.6–10.8 mm. They have a dark reddish brown, oblong body. The antennal club is yellowish brown. The dorsal surface is dull or weakly shiny and nearly glabrous and the labroclypeus is shiny.

== Etymology ==
The species name is derived from the combined Latin words, parilis (meaning equal) and forceps (meaning forceps or pincers), with reference to the symmetric parameres of the species.
