= Serica camura =

Scientific classification
- Kingdom: Animalia
- Phylum: Arthropoda
- Class: Insecta
- Order: Coleoptera
- Suborder: Polyphaga
- Infraorder: Scarabaeiformia
- Family: Scarabaeidae
- Genus: Serica
- Species: S. camura

Binomial name
- Serica camura Ahrens, Zhao, Pham & Liu, 2024

Species of beetle

Serica camura is a species of beetle of the family Scarabaeidae. It is found in China (Guizhou, Hunan).

== Description ==
Adults reach a length of about 8.2–8.8 mm. They have a dark brown, oval and strongly convex body. The head, pronotum and some spots on the elytra have a greenish shine. The elytra has darker spots and the antennae are yellow. The dorsal surface is weakly shiny or iridescent, with dense, short, white setae.

== Etymology ==
The species name is derived from Latin camurus (meaning curved) and refers to the strongly curved left paramere.
