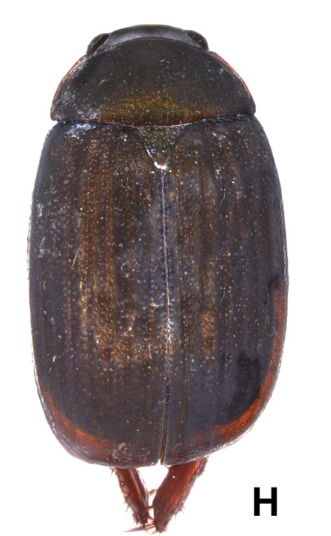

Scientific classification
- Kingdom: Animalia
- Phylum: Arthropoda
- Clade: Pancrustacea
- Class: Insecta
- Order: Coleoptera
- Suborder: Polyphaga
- Infraorder: Scarabaeiformia
- Family: Scarabaeidae
- Genus: Tetraserica
- Species: T. multiangulata

Binomial name
- Tetraserica multiangulata Fabrizi, Dalstein & Ahrens, 2019

= Tetraserica multiangulata =

Species of beetle

Tetraserica multiangulata is a species of beetle of the family Scarabaeidae. It is found in Vietnam.

== Description ==
Adults reach a length of about 7.6 mm. The surface of the labroclypeus and the disc of the frons are glabrous. The smooth area anterior to the eye is twice as wide as long.

== Etymology ==
The species name is derived from Latin multi (meaning numerous) and angulatus (meaning angled) and refers to the parameres being bent numerous times.
