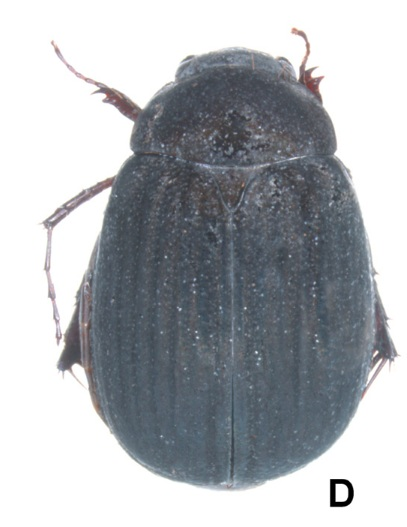

Scientific classification
- Kingdom: Animalia
- Phylum: Arthropoda
- Clade: Pancrustacea
- Class: Insecta
- Order: Coleoptera
- Suborder: Polyphaga
- Infraorder: Scarabaeiformia
- Family: Scarabaeidae
- Genus: Tetraserica
- Species: T. falciforceps

Binomial name
- Tetraserica falciforceps Fabrizi, Dalstein & Ahrens, 2019

= Tetraserica falciforceps =

Species of beetle

Tetraserica falciforceps is a species of beetle of the family Scarabaeidae. It is found in Laos.

== Description ==
Adults reach a length of about 6.9–7.5 mm. The dorsal surface is blackish and the ventral surface is reddish brown. The surface of the labroclypeus and the disc of the frons are glabrous. The smooth area anterior to the eye is twice as wide as long.

== Etymology ==
The species name is derived from Latin falcis (meaning sickle) and forceps and refers to setae present to the sickle-shaped right paramere.
