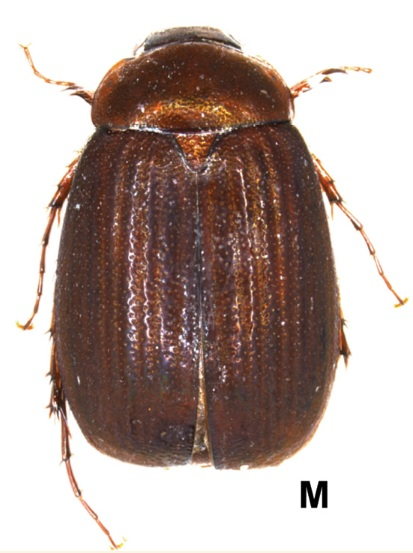

Scientific classification
- Kingdom: Animalia
- Phylum: Arthropoda
- Clade: Pancrustacea
- Class: Insecta
- Order: Coleoptera
- Suborder: Polyphaga
- Infraorder: Scarabaeiformia
- Family: Scarabaeidae
- Genus: Tetraserica
- Species: T. longipenis

Binomial name
- Tetraserica longipenis Liu, Fabrizi, Bai, Yang & Ahrens, 2014

= Tetraserica longipenis =

Species of beetle

Tetraserica longipenis is a species of beetle of the family Scarabaeidae. It is found in China (Guangxi, Guizhou, Sichuan, Yunnan), Laos, Thailand and Vietnam.

== Description ==
Adults reach a length of about 7–7.8 mm. The surface of the labroclypeus and the disc of the frons are glabrous. The smooth area anterior to the eye is twice as wide as long.

== Etymology ==
The species name is derived from Latin longus (meaning long) and penis (the male copulation organ) and refers to the long parameres of the species.
