= Neoserica diplospinosa =

Scientific classification
- Kingdom: Animalia
- Phylum: Arthropoda
- Class: Insecta
- Order: Coleoptera
- Suborder: Polyphaga
- Infraorder: Scarabaeiformia
- Family: Scarabaeidae
- Genus: Neoserica
- Species: N. diplospinosa

Binomial name
- Neoserica diplospinosa Ahrens & Pham, 2021

Species of beetle

Neoserica diplospinosa is a species of beetle of the family Scarabaeidae. It is found in Vietnam.

== Description ==
Adults reach a length of about 7–8.1 mm. They have a dark brown, oval body. The labroclypeus and legs are reddish brown and the antennal club is yellowish brown. The dorsal surface is mostly dull and nearly glabrous.

== Etymology ==
The species name is derived from Greek diplo- (meaning bifold) and spinosa (meaning spinose) and refers on the bi-spinose shape of the left paramere.
