= Maladera uncipenis =

Scientific classification
- Kingdom: Animalia
- Phylum: Arthropoda
- Class: Insecta
- Order: Coleoptera
- Suborder: Polyphaga
- Infraorder: Scarabaeiformia
- Family: Scarabaeidae
- Genus: Maladera
- Species: M. uncipenis

Binomial name
- Maladera uncipenis Ahrens, Fabrizi & Liu, 2021

Species of beetle

Maladera uncipenis is a species of beetle of the family Scarabaeidae. It is found in China (Fujian, Guizhou).

== Description ==
Adults reach a length of about 8.8–10 mm. They have a dark yellowish brown, oval body, with the head and disc of the pronotum darker. The antennae are yellow. The labroclypeus is weakly shiny, but the remainder of the dorsal surface is dull and glabrous.

== Etymology ==
The species name is derived from Latin uncus (meaning hook-shaped) and penis and refers to the hook-like shape of the right paramere.
