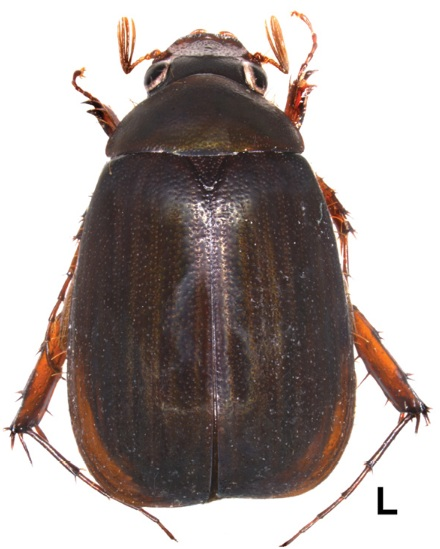

Scientific classification
- Kingdom: Animalia
- Phylum: Arthropoda
- Clade: Pancrustacea
- Class: Insecta
- Order: Coleoptera
- Suborder: Polyphaga
- Infraorder: Scarabaeiformia
- Family: Scarabaeidae
- Genus: Tetraserica
- Species: T. microfurcata

Binomial name
- Tetraserica microfurcata Fabrizi, Dalstein & Ahrens, 2019

= Tetraserica microfurcata =

Species of beetle

Tetraserica microfurcata is a species of beetle of the family Scarabaeidae. It is found in Laos and Vietnam.

== Description ==
Adults reach a length of about 7.6–8.6 mm. The surface of the labroclypeus and the disc of the frons are glabrous. The smooth area anterior to the eye is twice as wide as long.

== Etymology ==
The species name is derived from the combined Greek and Latin words micros (meaning small) and furcatus (meaning forked) and refers to the superficial split of the left paramere into two filiform branches.
