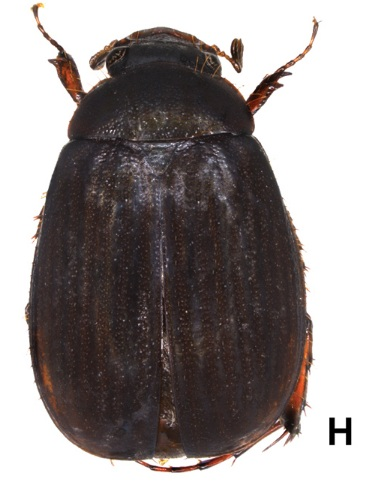

Scientific classification
- Kingdom: Animalia
- Phylum: Arthropoda
- Clade: Pancrustacea
- Class: Insecta
- Order: Coleoptera
- Suborder: Polyphaga
- Infraorder: Scarabaeiformia
- Family: Scarabaeidae
- Genus: Tetraserica
- Species: T. microspinosa

Binomial name
- Tetraserica microspinosa Fabrizi, Dalstein & Ahrens, 2019

= Tetraserica microspinosa =

Species of beetle

Tetraserica microspinosa is a species of beetle of the family Scarabaeidae. It is found in Vietnam.

== Description ==
Adults reach a length of about 7.5 mm. The surface of the labroclypeus and the disc of the frons are glabrous. The smooth area anterior to the eye is twice as wide as long.

== Etymology ==
The species name is derived from the combined Greek and Latin words micros (meaning small) and spinosus (meaning with spines) and refers to a small spine-like tooth on the left paramere.
