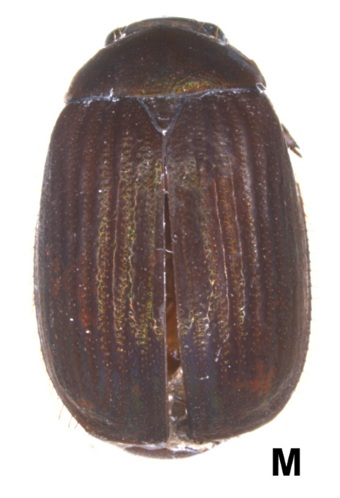

Scientific classification
- Kingdom: Animalia
- Phylum: Arthropoda
- Clade: Pancrustacea
- Class: Insecta
- Order: Coleoptera
- Suborder: Polyphaga
- Infraorder: Scarabaeiformia
- Family: Scarabaeidae
- Genus: Tetraserica
- Species: T. parasetuliforceps

Binomial name
- Tetraserica parasetuliforceps Fabrizi, Dalstein & Ahrens, 2019

= Tetraserica parasetuliforceps =

Species of beetle

Tetraserica parasetuliforceps, is a species of beetle of the family Scarabaeidae. It is found in Thailand.

== Description ==
Adults reach a length of about 7.6 mm. The surface of the labroclypeus and the disc of the frons are glabrous. The smooth area anterior to the eye is twice as wide as long.

== Etymology ==
The species name is derived from Greek para- (meaning near) and the species name setuliforceps and refers to its similarity to Tetraserica setuliforceps.
