= Tetraserica elargata =

Scientific classification
- Kingdom: Animalia
- Phylum: Arthropoda
- Class: Insecta
- Order: Coleoptera
- Suborder: Polyphaga
- Infraorder: Scarabaeiformia
- Family: Scarabaeidae
- Genus: Tetraserica
- Species: T. elargata

Binomial name
- Tetraserica elargata Ahrens, Pacholátko & Pham, 2025

Species of beetle

Tetraserica elargata is a species of beetle of the family Scarabaeidae. It is found in Laos.

== Description ==
Adults reach a length of about 10.4 mm. The dorsal surface is dark brown and glabrous, the pronotum with a weak greenish shine. The ventral surface and the legs are reddish brown and the antennae are yellow.

== Etymology ==
The species name is derived from Latin elargatus (meaning widened) and refers to its apically widened left paramere.
