= Maladera subinaequalis =

Scientific classification
- Kingdom: Animalia
- Phylum: Arthropoda
- Class: Insecta
- Order: Coleoptera
- Suborder: Polyphaga
- Infraorder: Scarabaeiformia
- Family: Scarabaeidae
- Genus: Maladera
- Species: M. subinaequalis

Binomial name
- Maladera subinaequalis Sreedevi & Ahrens, 2025

Species of beetle

Maladera subinaequalis is a species of beetle of the family Scarabaeidae. It is found in India (Tamil Nadu).

== Description ==
Adults reach a length of about 9.2 mm. They have a reddish brown, short-oval body. The antennae are yellow. The labroclypeus is shiny, but the remainder of the dorsal surface is dull with white short setae.

== Etymology ==
The species name is derived from Latin sub- (meaning almost) and inaequalis (meaning inequal) and refers to the morphology of the parameres of the aedeagus.
