= Gynaecoserica annuliforceps =

Scientific classification
- Kingdom: Animalia
- Phylum: Arthropoda
- Class: Insecta
- Order: Coleoptera
- Suborder: Polyphaga
- Infraorder: Scarabaeiformia
- Family: Scarabaeidae
- Genus: Gynaecoserica
- Species: G. annuliforceps

Binomial name
- Gynaecoserica annuliforceps Ahrens & Fabrizi, 2009

Species of beetle

Gynaecoserica annuliforceps is a species of beetle of the family Scarabaeidae. It is found in India (Arunachal Pradesh).

== Description ==
Adults reach a length of about 7-7.3 mm. They have an oval body. The dorsal surface is blackish brown, the antennal club is black (while the rest of the antennae is yellowish brown). The dorsal surface is dull with sparse, robust setae and numerous white, erect setae.

== Etymology ==
The species name is derived from Latin annulis (meaning ring) and forceps and refers to the shape of the left paramere.
