= Maladera sinobiloba =

Scientific classification
- Kingdom: Animalia
- Phylum: Arthropoda
- Class: Insecta
- Order: Coleoptera
- Suborder: Polyphaga
- Infraorder: Scarabaeiformia
- Family: Scarabaeidae
- Genus: Maladera
- Species: M. sinobiloba

Binomial name
- Maladera sinobiloba Ahrens, Fabrizi & Liu, 2021

Species of beetle

Maladera sinobiloba is a species of beetle of the family Scarabaeidae. It is found in China (Yunnan).

== Description ==
Adults reach a length of about 7.8–8.6 mm. They have an oblong-oval body. The antennae are yellow. The dorsal surface is reddish brown, mostly dull (while the labroclypeus is shiny) and nearly glabrous (except for some single setae on the head).

== Etymology ==
The species name is derived from Latin sino (meaning Chinese) and lobus (meaning lobe), as well as Greek bi (meaning two) and refers to the sysmmetric parameres having two lobes.
