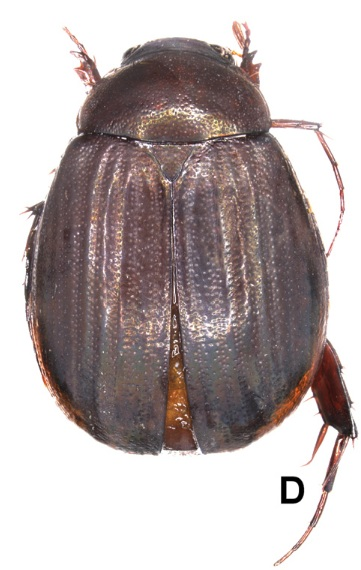

Scientific classification
- Kingdom: Animalia
- Phylum: Arthropoda
- Clade: Pancrustacea
- Class: Insecta
- Order: Coleoptera
- Suborder: Polyphaga
- Infraorder: Scarabaeiformia
- Family: Scarabaeidae
- Genus: Tetraserica
- Species: T. breviforceps

Binomial name
- Tetraserica breviforceps Fabrizi, Dalstein & Ahrens, 2019

= Tetraserica breviforceps =

Species of beetle

Tetraserica breviforceps is a species of beetle of the family Scarabaeidae. It is found in Laos.

== Description ==
Adults reach a length of about 8–9.2 mm. The surface of the labroclypeus and the disc of the frons are glabrous. The smooth area anterior to the eye is twice as wide as long.

== Etymology ==
The species name is derived from Latin brevis (meaning short) and forceps and refers to the short parameres.
