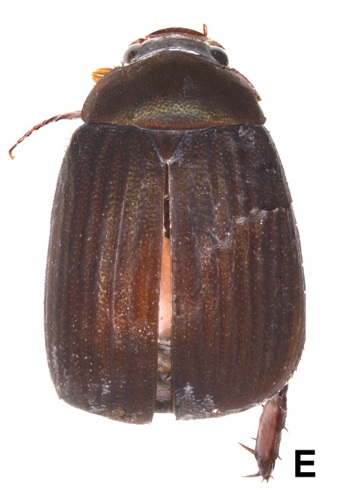

Scientific classification
- Kingdom: Animalia
- Phylum: Arthropoda
- Clade: Pancrustacea
- Class: Insecta
- Order: Coleoptera
- Suborder: Polyphaga
- Infraorder: Scarabaeiformia
- Family: Scarabaeidae
- Genus: Tetraserica
- Species: T. pseudouncinata

Binomial name
- Tetraserica pseudouncinata Fabrizi, Dalstein & Ahrens, 2019

= Tetraserica pseudouncinata =

Species of beetle

Tetraserica pseudouncinata is a species of beetle of the family Scarabaeidae. It is found in China (Guangxi).

== Description ==
Adults reach a length of about 9.3 mm. The surface of the labroclypeus and the disc of the frons are glabrous. The smooth area anterior to the eye is twice as wide as long.

== Etymology ==
The species name is derived from the combined Greek word pseudo- (meaning false) and the Latin word uncinatus and refers to the uncinated shape of the right paramere.
