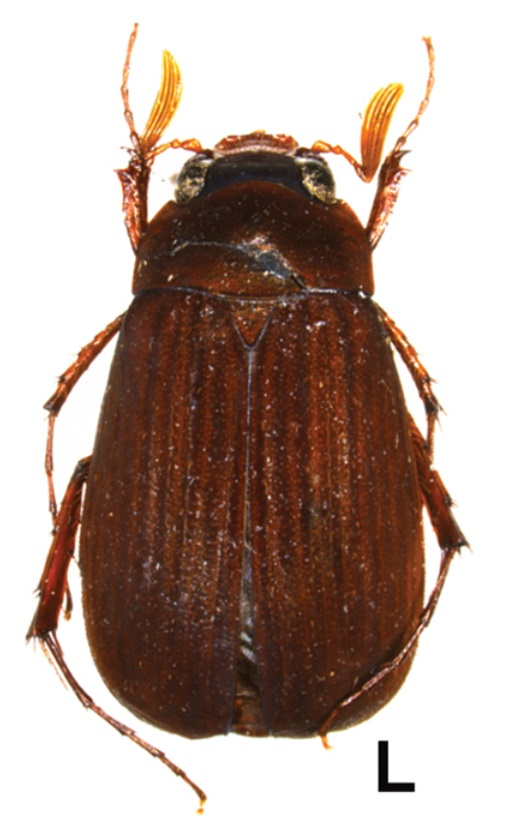

Scientific classification
- Kingdom: Animalia
- Phylum: Arthropoda
- Class: Insecta
- Order: Coleoptera
- Suborder: Polyphaga
- Infraorder: Scarabaeiformia
- Family: Scarabaeidae
- Genus: Neoserica
- Species: N. trifida

Binomial name
- Neoserica trifida Ahrens, Liu, Fabrizi, Bai & Yang, 2014

= Neoserica trifida =

Species of beetle

Neoserica trifida is a species of beetle of the family Scarabaeidae. It is found in China (Yunnan).

== Description ==
Adults reach a length of about 10.5–10.7 mm. They have a dark brown, oblong body. The antennal club is yellowish brown and the anterior labroclypeus is shiny. The dorsal surface is dull and nearly glabrous.

== Etymology ==
The species is named trifida with reference to its trifid left paramere.
