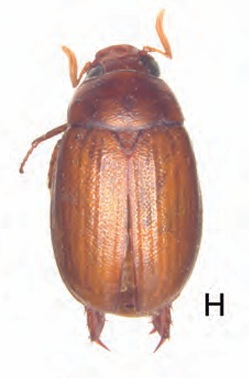

Scientific classification
- Kingdom: Animalia
- Phylum: Arthropoda
- Class: Insecta
- Order: Coleoptera
- Suborder: Polyphaga
- Infraorder: Scarabaeiformia
- Family: Scarabaeidae
- Genus: Maladera
- Species: M. faceta

Binomial name
- Maladera faceta Ahrens & Fabrizi, 2016

= Maladera faceta =

Species of beetle

Maladera faceta is a species of beetle of the family Scarabaeidae. It is found in southern India.

== Description ==
Adults reach a length of about 6.7 mm. They have a yellowish brown, oval body, with the antennae yellowish. The head is shiny and the dorsal surface is dull and nearly glabrous.

== Etymology ==
The species name is derived from Latin facetus (meaning delicate) and refers to its fine filiform basal lobe of the left paramere.
