= Maladera trifidiforceps =

Scientific classification
- Kingdom: Animalia
- Phylum: Arthropoda
- Class: Insecta
- Order: Coleoptera
- Suborder: Polyphaga
- Infraorder: Scarabaeiformia
- Family: Scarabaeidae
- Genus: Maladera
- Species: M. trifidiforceps

Binomial name
- Maladera trifidiforceps Ahrens, Fabrizi & Liu, 2021

Species of beetle

Maladera trifidiforceps is a species of beetle of the family Scarabaeidae. It is found in China (Sichuan).

== Description ==
Adults reach a length of about 8–8.7 mm. They have a dark brown, wide, oval body. The legs are brown and the antennae are yellow. The dorsal surface is dull (but the labroclypeus, tarsomeres, and tibiae are shiny) and glabrous.

== Etymology ==
The species name is derived from Latin tri (meaning three), fidus (meaning process) and forceps (meaning pins) and refers to the aedeagus having three appendages produced by the two parameres.
