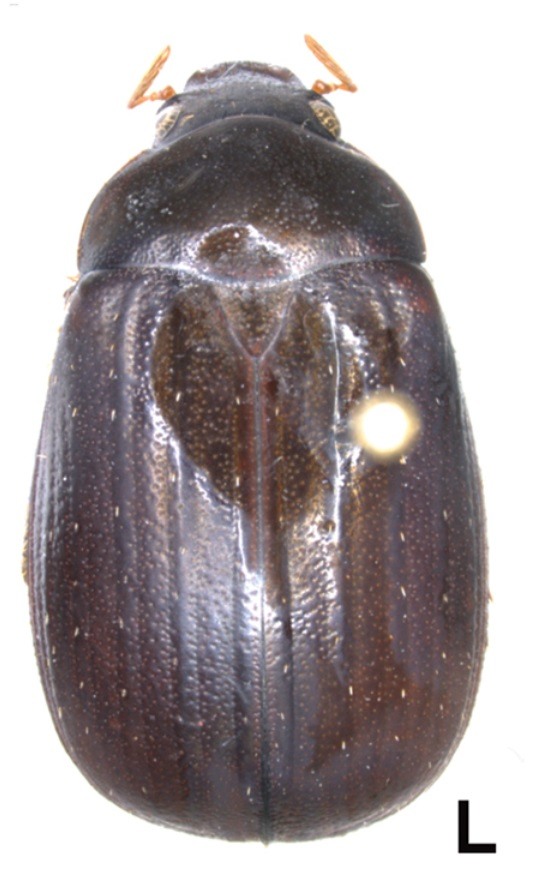

Scientific classification
- Kingdom: Animalia
- Phylum: Arthropoda
- Class: Insecta
- Order: Coleoptera
- Suborder: Polyphaga
- Infraorder: Scarabaeiformia
- Family: Scarabaeidae
- Genus: Neoserica
- Species: N. simplicissima

Binomial name
- Neoserica simplicissima Ahrens, Liu, Fabrizi, Bai & Yang, 2014

= Neoserica simplicissima =

Species of beetle

Neoserica simplicissima is a species of beetle of the family Scarabaeidae. It is found in Laos.

== Description ==
Adults reach a length of about 12.2–12.8 mm. They have a dark brown, oblong body. The antennal club is yellowish brown and the anterior labroclypeus is shiny. The dorsal surface is dull, partially dull toment lost and moderately shiny, and sparsely setose.

== Etymology ==
The species is named simplicissima (from the Latin adjective, meaning very simple) with reference to the lacking basal lobe of the right paramere.
