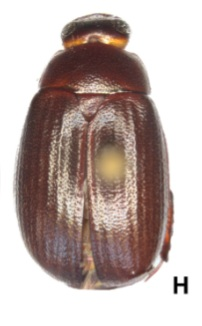

Scientific classification
- Kingdom: Animalia
- Phylum: Arthropoda
- Class: Insecta
- Order: Coleoptera
- Suborder: Polyphaga
- Infraorder: Scarabaeiformia
- Family: Scarabaeidae
- Genus: Maladera
- Species: M. cervicornis

Binomial name
- Maladera cervicornis Ranasinghe, Eberle, Benjamin & Ahrens, 2020

= Maladera cervicornis =

Species of beetle

Maladera cervicornis is a species of beetle of the family Scarabaeidae. It is found in Sri Lanka.

== Description ==
Adults reach a length of about 7.2–7.8 mm. They have a dark brown, short oval body. The antennae are yellow, and the dorsal surface is shiny and nearly completely glabrous.

== Etymology ==
The name of the species is derived from Latin cornu (meaning horn) and cervus (meaning deer) and refers to the shape of the parameres, resembling the horns of a deer.
