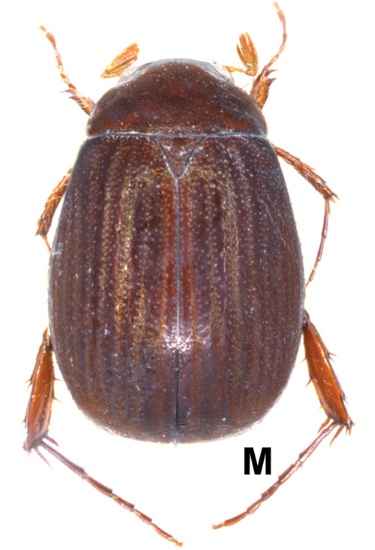

Scientific classification
- Kingdom: Animalia
- Phylum: Arthropoda
- Clade: Pancrustacea
- Class: Insecta
- Order: Coleoptera
- Suborder: Polyphaga
- Infraorder: Scarabaeiformia
- Family: Scarabaeidae
- Genus: Tetraserica
- Species: T. curviforceps

Binomial name
- Tetraserica curviforceps Fabrizi, Dalstein & Ahrens, 2019

= Tetraserica curviforceps =

Species of beetle

Tetraserica curviforceps is a species of beetle of the family Scarabaeidae. It is found in Laos.

== Description ==
Adults reach a length of about 6.5–7.8 mm. The surface of the labroclypeus and the disc of the frons are glabrous. The smooth area anterior to the eye is twice as wide as long.

== Etymology ==
The species name is derived from Latin curvus (meaning curved) and forceps and refers to the shape of the curved right paramere.
