= Gynaecoserica nahangensis =

Scientific classification
- Kingdom: Animalia
- Phylum: Arthropoda
- Class: Insecta
- Order: Coleoptera
- Suborder: Polyphaga
- Infraorder: Scarabaeiformia
- Family: Scarabaeidae
- Genus: Gynaecoserica
- Species: G. nahangensis

Binomial name
- Gynaecoserica nahangensis Ahrens & Fabrizi, 2009

Species of beetle

Gynaecoserica nahangensis is a species of beetle of the family Scarabaeidae. It is found in Vietnam and China (Yunnan).

== Description ==
Adults reach a length of about 4–4.2 mm. They have an oval body. The surface is yellowish brown, the frons posteriorly a little darker. The dorsal surface (except for the head) is dull and almost glabrous.

== Etymology ==
The species name refers to the type locality, Na Hang.
