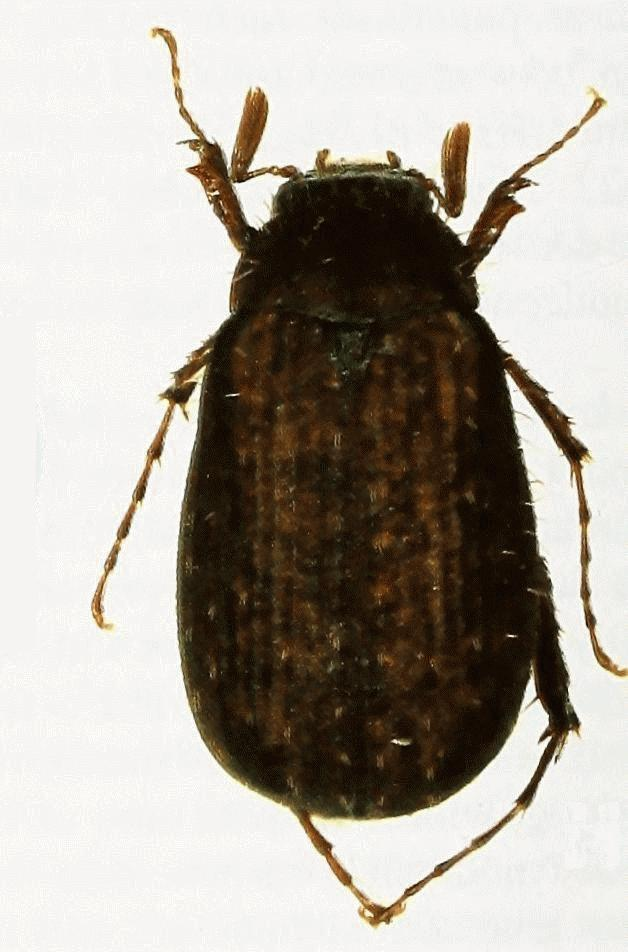

Scientific classification
- Kingdom: Animalia
- Phylum: Arthropoda
- Class: Insecta
- Order: Coleoptera
- Suborder: Polyphaga
- Infraorder: Scarabaeiformia
- Family: Scarabaeidae
- Genus: Gynaecoserica
- Species: G. victori

Binomial name
- Gynaecoserica victori Ahrens & Fabrizi, 2011

= Gynaecoserica victori =

Species of beetle

Gynaecoserica victori is a species of beetle of the family Scarabaeidae. It is found in Bhutan.

== Description ==
Adults reach a length of about 5.8 mm. They have an oblong body. The dorsal surface is brown with the margins of the pronotum lighter and with numerous yellowish dots on the elytra. The antennae and legs are yellowish brown. The dorsal surface is dull and sparsely setose.

== Etymology ==
The species name refers to the collector of the species, Victor Siniaev.
