= Gynaecoserica bihtanensis =

Scientific classification
- Kingdom: Animalia
- Phylum: Arthropoda
- Class: Insecta
- Order: Coleoptera
- Suborder: Polyphaga
- Infraorder: Scarabaeiformia
- Family: Scarabaeidae
- Genus: Gynaecoserica
- Species: G. bihtanensis

Binomial name
- Gynaecoserica bihtanensis Ahrens, 2021

Species of beetle

Gynaecoserica bihtanensis is a species of beetle of the family Scarabaeidae. It is found in Myanmar.

== Description ==
Adults reach a length of about 4.4 mm. They have an oblong body. The dorsal surface is dark greenish brown, while the antennae and legs are yellowish. The dorsal surface (except for the shiny head) is dull and sparsely setose.

== Etymology ==
The species is named after its type locality, Bihtan.
