= Gynaecoserica bocaki =

Scientific classification
- Kingdom: Animalia
- Phylum: Arthropoda
- Class: Insecta
- Order: Coleoptera
- Suborder: Polyphaga
- Infraorder: Scarabaeiformia
- Family: Scarabaeidae
- Genus: Gynaecoserica
- Species: G. bocaki

Binomial name
- Gynaecoserica bocaki Ahrens & Fabrizi, 2009

Species of beetle

Gynaecoserica bocaki is a species of beetle of the family Scarabaeidae. It is found in China (Yunnan).

== Description ==
Adults reach a length of about 4.7–5 mm. They have a moderately oval body. The surface is light reddish brown with the disc of the pronotum and the lateral elytral margins are widely darker, while the legs and labroclypeus are yellowish brown. The dorsal surface, except for the head, is moderately dull and sparsely setose.

== Etymology ==
The species is named after its collector, L. Bocák.
