= Gynaecoserica lobiceps =

Scientific classification
- Kingdom: Animalia
- Phylum: Arthropoda
- Class: Insecta
- Order: Coleoptera
- Suborder: Polyphaga
- Infraorder: Scarabaeiformia
- Family: Scarabaeidae
- Genus: Gynaecoserica
- Species: G. lobiceps

Binomial name
- Gynaecoserica lobiceps Ahrens & Fabrizi, 2009

Species of beetle

Gynaecoserica lobiceps is a species of beetle of the family Scarabaeidae. It is found in India (Meghalaya).

== Description ==
Adults reach a length of about 5–5.2 mm. They have an oval body. The dorsal surface is reddish brown, with the frons, a median spot on the pronotum, the sutural and lateral intervals of the elytra, and the ventral surface are dark brown, while the antennae are yellowish with a dark club. The dorsal surface is dull and sparsely robustly setose.

== Etymology ==
The species name is derived from Latin lobus and ceps and refers to the lobiform apical apophysis of the phallobase.
