= Gynaecoserica ziyardamensis =

Scientific classification
- Kingdom: Animalia
- Phylum: Arthropoda
- Class: Insecta
- Order: Coleoptera
- Suborder: Polyphaga
- Infraorder: Scarabaeiformia
- Family: Scarabaeidae
- Genus: Gynaecoserica
- Species: G. ziyardamensis

Binomial name
- Gynaecoserica ziyardamensis Ahrens & Fabrizi, 2009

Species of beetle

Gynaecoserica ziyardamensis is a species of beetle of the family Scarabaeidae. It is found in Myanmar.

== Description ==
Adults reach a length of about 4–4.4 mm. They have a moderately oblong body. The surface is dark reddish brown, with the elytra partly yellowish. The dorsal surface (except for the head) is dull and sparsely erectly setose.

== Etymology ==
The species is named after its type locality, the Zi Yar Dam.
