= Gynaecoserica bomdilana =

Scientific classification
- Kingdom: Animalia
- Phylum: Arthropoda
- Class: Insecta
- Order: Coleoptera
- Suborder: Polyphaga
- Infraorder: Scarabaeiformia
- Family: Scarabaeidae
- Genus: Gynaecoserica
- Species: G. bomdilana

Binomial name
- Gynaecoserica bomdilana Ahrens & Fabrizi, 2009

Species of beetle

Gynaecoserica bomdilana is a species of beetle of the family Scarabaeidae. It is found in India (Arunachal Pradesh).

== Description ==
Adults reach a length of about 6.8–6.9 mm. They have an oblong body. The surface is dark brown with numerous yellowish spots on the elytra. The antennae are yellowish. The dorsal surface is dull, the head shiny, and the entire surface is sparsely setose.

== Etymology ==
The species is named after the village Bomdila, close to the type locality.
