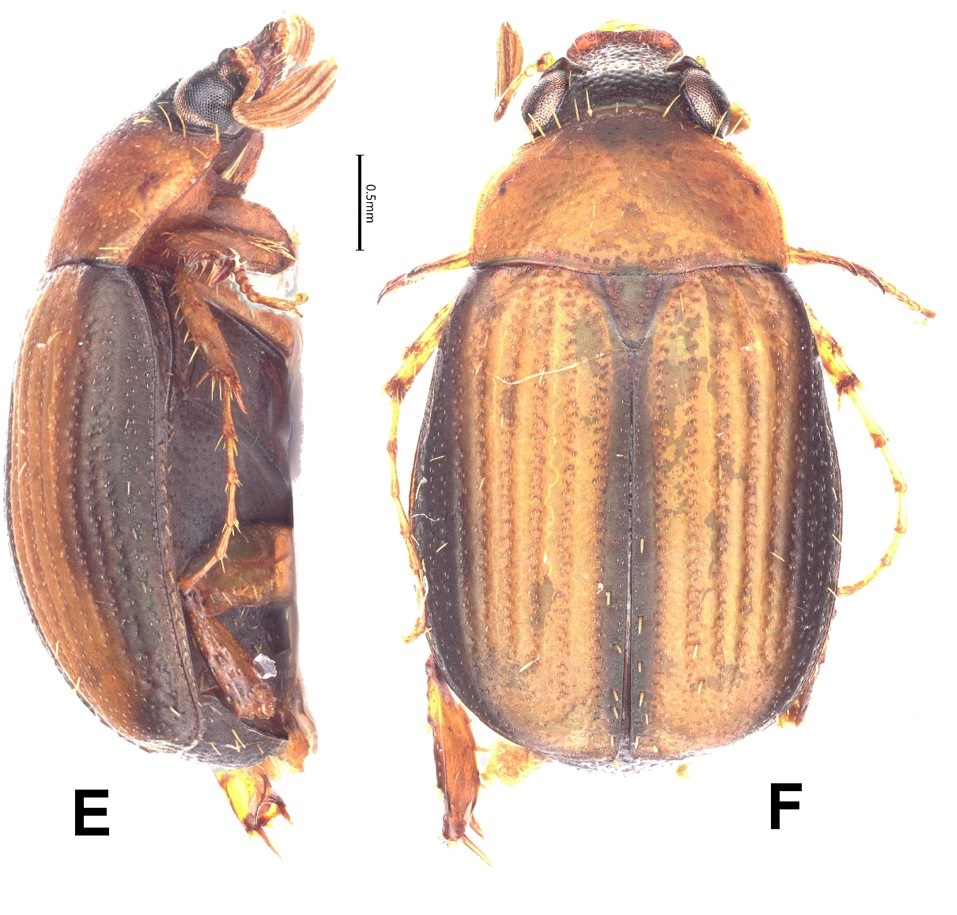

Scientific classification
- Kingdom: Animalia
- Phylum: Arthropoda
- Clade: Pancrustacea
- Class: Insecta
- Order: Coleoptera
- Suborder: Polyphaga
- Infraorder: Scarabaeiformia
- Family: Scarabaeidae
- Genus: Gynaecoserica
- Species: G. loisau

Binomial name
- Gynaecoserica loisau Lia Botjes & Ahrens, 2026

= Gynaecoserica loisau =

Species of beetle

Gynaecoserica loisau is a species of beetle of the family Scarabaeidae. It is found in Myanmar.

== Description ==
Adults reach a length of about 4.6 mm (0.18 in). They have an oblong body. The dorsal surface is yellowish brown, while the frons and elytral margins are dark brown, and the antennae and legs yellow. Except for the shiny head, the dorsal surface dull, and sparsely setose.

== Etymology ==
The species is named after its type locality, Mt. Loisau.
