= Gynaecoserica perdita =

Scientific classification
- Kingdom: Animalia
- Phylum: Arthropoda
- Class: Insecta
- Order: Coleoptera
- Suborder: Polyphaga
- Infraorder: Scarabaeiformia
- Family: Scarabaeidae
- Genus: Gynaecoserica
- Species: G. perdita

Binomial name
- Gynaecoserica perdita Ahrens, 2004

Species of beetle

Gynaecoserica perdita is a species of beetle of the family Scarabaeidae. It is found in India (Sikkim).

== Description ==
Adults reach a length of about 4.3-5.4 mm. They have a brown, oval body with small dark brown and copper-green spots. The upper surface is dull, except for the shiny head, and sparsely hairy.

== Etymology ==
The species name is derived from Latin perditus (meaning lost).
