= Gynaecoserica felina =

Scientific classification
- Kingdom: Animalia
- Phylum: Arthropoda
- Class: Insecta
- Order: Coleoptera
- Suborder: Polyphaga
- Infraorder: Scarabaeiformia
- Family: Scarabaeidae
- Genus: Gynaecoserica
- Species: G. felina

Binomial name
- Gynaecoserica felina (Arrow, 1946)

Synonyms
- Serica felina Arrow, 1946

Species of beetle

Gynaecoserica felina is a species of beetle of the family Scarabaeidae. It is found in Myanmar.

== Description ==
Adults reach a length of about 4.8 mm. They have an oblong body. The dorsal surface is dull, very sparsely setose and yellowish brown with dark spots.
