= Gynaecoserica obfuscata =

Scientific classification
- Kingdom: Animalia
- Phylum: Arthropoda
- Class: Insecta
- Order: Coleoptera
- Suborder: Polyphaga
- Infraorder: Scarabaeiformia
- Family: Scarabaeidae
- Genus: Gynaecoserica
- Species: G. obfuscata

Binomial name
- Gynaecoserica obfuscata Ahrens, 2022

Species of beetle

Gynaecoserica obfuscata is a species of beetle of the family Scarabaeidae. It is found in Laos.

== Description ==
Adults reach a length of about 4.6 mm. They have an oblong body. The dorsal surface is dark brown, the pronotum and scutellum with a greenish shine. The antennae and legs are yellowish. The dorsal surface, except for the head, is dull and almost glabrous and sparsely setose.

== Etymology ==
The species name is derived from Latin obfuscates (meaning darkened).
