= Gynaecoserica rostrata =

Scientific classification
- Kingdom: Animalia
- Phylum: Arthropoda
- Class: Insecta
- Order: Coleoptera
- Suborder: Polyphaga
- Infraorder: Scarabaeiformia
- Family: Scarabaeidae
- Genus: Gynaecoserica
- Species: G. rostrata

Binomial name
- Gynaecoserica rostrata Ahrens & Fabrizi, 2009

Species of beetle

Gynaecoserica rostrata is a species of beetle of the family Scarabaeidae. It is found in Myanmar and Thailand.

== Description ==
Adults reach a length of about 4–4.3 mm. They have an oblong oval body. The surface is dark reddish brown, with the elytra partly yellowish. The dorsal surface (except for the head) is dull and erectly setose.

== Etymology ==
The species name is derived from Latin rostrata (meaning provided with a hook) and refers to the shape of the apophysis of the phallobase.
