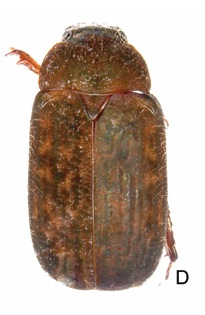

Scientific classification
- Kingdom: Animalia
- Phylum: Arthropoda
- Class: Insecta
- Order: Coleoptera
- Suborder: Polyphaga
- Infraorder: Scarabaeiformia
- Family: Scarabaeidae
- Genus: Gynaecoserica
- Species: G. motuoensis

Binomial name
- Gynaecoserica motuoensis Liu & Ahrens, 2017

= Gynaecoserica motuoensis =

Species of beetle

Gynaecoserica motuoensis is a species of beetle of the family Scarabaeidae. It is found in China (Xizang).

== Description ==
Adults reach a length of about 5.5 mm. They have an oblong body. The dorsal surface is dark brown to dark green and the antennae are yellowish brown. The dorsal surface is dull and densely erectly setose.

== Etymology ==
The species is named after its type locality, Motuo.
