= Gynaecoserica ignobilis =

Scientific classification
- Kingdom: Animalia
- Phylum: Arthropoda
- Class: Insecta
- Order: Coleoptera
- Suborder: Polyphaga
- Infraorder: Scarabaeiformia
- Family: Scarabaeidae
- Genus: Gynaecoserica
- Species: G. ignobilis

Binomial name
- Gynaecoserica ignobilis Ahrens & Fabrizi, 2009

Species of beetle

Gynaecoserica ignobilis is a species of beetle of the family Scarabaeidae. It is found in India (Meghalaya).

== Description ==
Adults reach a length of about 3.5–3.9 mm. They have an oval body. The dorsal surface is dark brown, with the antennae and legs yellowish brown, the pronotal margins reddish brown, and the surface partly with a greenish shine. The dorsal surface, except the head, is dull and almost glabrous.

== Etymology ==
The species name is derived from Latin ignobilis (meaning ignoble or unknown).
