= Gynaecoserica maekasana =

Scientific classification
- Kingdom: Animalia
- Phylum: Arthropoda
- Class: Insecta
- Order: Coleoptera
- Suborder: Polyphaga
- Infraorder: Scarabaeiformia
- Family: Scarabaeidae
- Genus: Gynaecoserica
- Species: G. maekasana

Binomial name
- Gynaecoserica maekasana Ahrens & Fabrizi, 2009

Species of beetle

Gynaecoserica maekasana is a species of beetle of the family Scarabaeidae. It is found in Thailand.

== Description ==
Adults reach a length of about 4.1 mm. They have an oval body. The surface is yellowish, the frons posteriorly a little darker. The dorsal surface (except for the head) is dull and almost glabrous.

== Etymology ==
The species name refers to the Mae Kasa stream, close to the type locality.
