= Gynaecoserica keithi =

Scientific classification
- Kingdom: Animalia
- Phylum: Arthropoda
- Class: Insecta
- Order: Coleoptera
- Suborder: Polyphaga
- Infraorder: Scarabaeiformia
- Family: Scarabaeidae
- Genus: Gynaecoserica
- Species: G. keithi

Binomial name
- Gynaecoserica keithi Ahrens & Fabrizi, 2009

Species of beetle

Gynaecoserica keithi is a species of beetle of the family Scarabaeidae. It is found in India (Meghalaya).

== Description ==
Adults reach a length of about 4.3–4.4 mm. They have an oval body. The dorsal surface is reddish brown, with the frons, a median spot on the pronotum, the sutural and lateral intervals of the elytra and ventral surface are dark brown, while the antennae are yellowish with a dark club. The dorsal surface, except the head, is dull and sparsely robustly setose.

== Etymology ==
The species is named after a friend and colleague of the author, Denis Keith.
