= Gynaecoserica schima =

Scientific classification
- Kingdom: Animalia
- Phylum: Arthropoda
- Class: Insecta
- Order: Coleoptera
- Suborder: Polyphaga
- Infraorder: Scarabaeiformia
- Family: Scarabaeidae
- Genus: Gynaecoserica
- Species: G. schima

Binomial name
- Gynaecoserica schima Ahrens & Fabrizi, 2009

Species of beetle

Gynaecoserica schima is a species of beetle of the family Scarabaeidae. It is found in Myanmar.

== Description ==
Adults reach a length of about 5.2–5.7 mm. They have a reddish brown, oblong body, with the frons darker and yellowish brown antennae. The dorsal surface is dull and sparsely setose.

== Etymology ==
The species name refers to the tree genus Schima, from which the type specimen was collected.
