= Gynaecoserica namtamaiensis =

Scientific classification
- Kingdom: Animalia
- Phylum: Arthropoda
- Class: Insecta
- Order: Coleoptera
- Suborder: Polyphaga
- Infraorder: Scarabaeiformia
- Family: Scarabaeidae
- Genus: Gynaecoserica
- Species: G. namtamaiensis

Binomial name
- Gynaecoserica namtamaiensis Ahrens & Fabrizi, 2009

Species of beetle

Gynaecoserica namtamaiensis is a species of beetle of the family Scarabaeidae. It is found in Myanmar and China (Yunnan).

== Description ==
Adults reach a length of about 4.4–4.5 mm. They have a dark to reddish brown, oblong body. The antennae are yellowish brown. The dorsal surface (except for the head) is dull and sparsely setose.

== Etymology ==
The species name refers to the Nam Tamai Valley, where the type specimens were collected.
