= Gynaecoserica feresimplex =

Scientific classification
- Kingdom: Animalia
- Phylum: Arthropoda
- Class: Insecta
- Order: Coleoptera
- Suborder: Polyphaga
- Infraorder: Scarabaeiformia
- Family: Scarabaeidae
- Genus: Gynaecoserica
- Species: G. feresimplex

Binomial name
- Gynaecoserica feresimplex Ahrens, 2021

Species of beetle

Gynaecoserica feresimplex is a species of beetle of the family Scarabaeidae. It is found in Thailand.

== Description ==
Adults reach a length of about 3.5–4.4 mm. They have an oblong body. The dorsal surface is dark-yellowish brown, with the frons dark greenish brown and the antennae and legs yellow. Except for the shiny head, the dorsal surface is dull and sparsely setose.

== Etymology ==
The species name is derived from Latin fere (meaning nearly) and simplex (meaning simple) and refers to its similarity with Microserica simplex.
