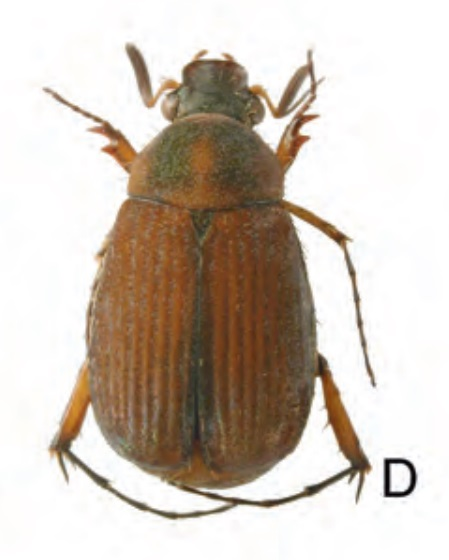

Scientific classification
- Kingdom: Animalia
- Phylum: Arthropoda
- Class: Insecta
- Order: Coleoptera
- Suborder: Polyphaga
- Infraorder: Scarabaeiformia
- Family: Scarabaeidae
- Genus: Gynaecoserica
- Species: G. singhikensis

Binomial name
- Gynaecoserica singhikensis Ahrens, 2004

= Gynaecoserica singhikensis =

Species of beetle

Gynaecoserica singhikensis is a species of beetle of the family Scarabaeidae. It is found in eastern Sikkim.

== Description ==
Adults reach a length of about 6.3-7.1 mm. They have a yellow-brown, elongate body. The underside and scutellum are dark brown, while the center of the pronotum is green, but its margins are yellowish. There is sometimes a light central stripe. The sides of the elytra are darkened and the surface is dull and almost completely glabrous.

== Etymology ==
The species is named for its type location, Singhik.
