= Gynaecoserica bicolorata =

Scientific classification
- Kingdom: Animalia
- Phylum: Arthropoda
- Class: Insecta
- Order: Coleoptera
- Suborder: Polyphaga
- Infraorder: Scarabaeiformia
- Family: Scarabaeidae
- Genus: Gynaecoserica
- Species: G. bicolorata

Binomial name
- Gynaecoserica bicolorata Ahrens & Fabrizi, 2009

Species of beetle

Gynaecoserica bicolorata is a species of beetle of the family Scarabaeidae. It is found in India (Meghalaya).

== Description ==
Adults reach a length of about 4.7 mm. They have an oval body. The surface is yellowish brown and the elytra and frons are dark brown. The dorsal surface is shiny and sparsely setose.

== Etymology ==
The species name is derived from Latin bi (meaning two) and coloratus (meaning coloured).
