= Gynaecoserica compacta =

Scientific classification
- Kingdom: Animalia
- Phylum: Arthropoda
- Class: Insecta
- Order: Coleoptera
- Suborder: Polyphaga
- Infraorder: Scarabaeiformia
- Family: Scarabaeidae
- Genus: Gynaecoserica
- Species: G. compacta

Binomial name
- Gynaecoserica compacta Ahrens & Fabrizi, 2009

Species of beetle

Gynaecoserica compacta is a species of beetle of the family Scarabaeidae. It is found in India (Meghalaya).

== Description ==
Adults reach a length of about 6–6.3 mm. They have an oblong oval body. The surface is dark reddish brown, and the dorsal surface is shiny and sparsely setose.

== Etymology ==
The species name is derived from Latin compactus (meaning stout) and refers to the stout body shape.
