= Gynaecoserica pellecta =

Scientific classification
- Kingdom: Animalia
- Phylum: Arthropoda
- Class: Insecta
- Order: Coleoptera
- Suborder: Polyphaga
- Infraorder: Scarabaeiformia
- Family: Scarabaeidae
- Genus: Gynaecoserica
- Species: G. pellecta

Binomial name
- Gynaecoserica pellecta Brenske, 1896

Synonyms
- Serica minutula Brenske, 1894 (nec Heer, 1862)

Species of beetle

Gynaecoserica pellecta is a species of beetle of the family Scarabaeidae. It is found from eastern-central Nepal to Bhutan.

== Description ==
Adults reach a length of about 4.3-4.8 mm. They have a light yellow to dark brown body. The dorsal surface with long setae.
