= Gynaecoserica maymyoensis =

Scientific classification
- Kingdom: Animalia
- Phylum: Arthropoda
- Class: Insecta
- Order: Coleoptera
- Suborder: Polyphaga
- Infraorder: Scarabaeiformia
- Family: Scarabaeidae
- Genus: Gynaecoserica
- Species: G. maymyoensis

Binomial name
- Gynaecoserica maymyoensis Ahrens & Fabrizi, 2009

Species of beetle

Gynaecoserica maymyoensis is a species of beetle of the family Scarabaeidae. It is found in Myanmar.

== Description ==
Adults reach a length of about 3.8–4 mm. They have an oval body. The dorsal surface is yellowish brown, with the head, two symmetrical spots on the pronotum, the sutural and lateral intervals of the elytra, and the ventral surface dark, partly with a greenish shine. The antennae are yellowish. The dorsal surface (except for the head) is dull or iridescent shiny and almost glabrous.

== Etymology ==
The species name refers to the type locality, Maymyo.
