= Gynaecoserica stemmleri =

Scientific classification
- Kingdom: Animalia
- Phylum: Arthropoda
- Class: Insecta
- Order: Coleoptera
- Suborder: Polyphaga
- Infraorder: Scarabaeiformia
- Family: Scarabaeidae
- Genus: Gynaecoserica
- Species: G. stemmleri

Binomial name
- Gynaecoserica stemmleri (Frey, 1975)

Synonyms
- Microserica stemmleri Frey, 1975; Leuroserica stemmleri

Species of beetle

Gynaecoserica stemmleri is a species of beetle of the family Scarabaeidae. It is found in Bhutan and India (Arunachal Pradesh).
