= Gynaecoserica arunachalensis =

Scientific classification
- Kingdom: Animalia
- Phylum: Arthropoda
- Class: Insecta
- Order: Coleoptera
- Suborder: Polyphaga
- Infraorder: Scarabaeiformia
- Family: Scarabaeidae
- Genus: Gynaecoserica
- Species: G. arunachalensis

Binomial name
- Gynaecoserica arunachalensis Ahrens & Fabrizi, 2009

Species of beetle

Gynaecoserica arunachalensis is a species of beetle of the family Scarabaeidae. It is found in India (Arunachal Pradesh).

== Description ==
Adults reach a length of about 5.1 mm. They have an oblong body. The dorsal surface is yellowish brown with numerous dark brown dots on the pronotum and elytra. The antennae and legs are yellowish brown. The dorsal surface is dull and very sparsely setose.

== Etymology ==
The species name is refers to its occurrence in Arunachal Pradesh.
