= Gynaecoserica alma =

Scientific classification
- Kingdom: Animalia
- Phylum: Arthropoda
- Class: Insecta
- Order: Coleoptera
- Suborder: Polyphaga
- Infraorder: Scarabaeiformia
- Family: Scarabaeidae
- Genus: Gynaecoserica
- Species: G. alma

Binomial name
- Gynaecoserica alma Ahrens & Fabrizi, 2009

Species of beetle

Gynaecoserica alma is a species of beetle of the family Scarabaeidae. It is found in China (Yunnan).

== Description ==
Adults reach a length of about 5.8 mm. They have an oblong body. The dorsal surface is dark brown and the antennae are yellowish brown. The dorsal surface is dull and very sparsely setose.

== Etymology ==
The species name is derived from Latin almus (meaning fertile).
