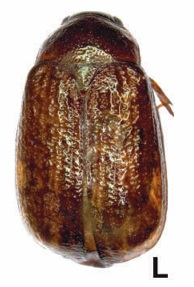

Scientific classification
- Kingdom: Animalia
- Phylum: Arthropoda
- Class: Insecta
- Order: Coleoptera
- Suborder: Polyphaga
- Infraorder: Scarabaeiformia
- Family: Scarabaeidae
- Genus: Gynaecoserica
- Species: G. yigongensis

Binomial name
- Gynaecoserica yigongensis Liu & Ahrens, 2014

= Gynaecoserica yigongensis =

Species of beetle

Gynaecoserica yigongensis is a species of beetle of the family Scarabaeidae. It is found in China (Xizang).

== Description ==
Adults reach a length of about 6.1–6.2 mm. They have a shiny, oblong body. The surface is dark reddish brown, with the frons, abdomen and some spots on the elytra dark brown and the legs and antennae yellowish brown. The dorsal surface is nearly glabrous.

== Etymology ==
The species is named after the type locality, Yigong.
