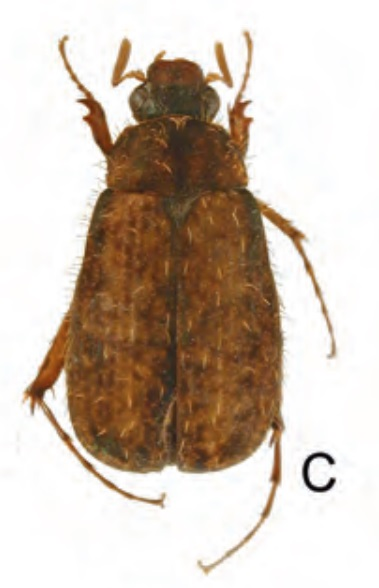

Scientific classification
- Kingdom: Animalia
- Phylum: Arthropoda
- Clade: Pancrustacea
- Class: Insecta
- Order: Coleoptera
- Suborder: Polyphaga
- Infraorder: Scarabaeiformia
- Family: Scarabaeidae
- Genus: Gynaecoserica
- Species: G. variipennis

Binomial name
- Gynaecoserica variipennis (Moser, 1916)

Synonyms
- Lasioserica variipennis Moser, 1916; Lasioserica wuermlii Frey, 1975

= Gynaecoserica variipennis =

Species of beetle

Gynaecoserica variipennis is a species of beetle of the family Scarabaeidae. It is found in Bhutan and in the Himalaya from eastern central Nepal to the Darjeeling-Sikkim area in India.

== Description ==
Adults reach a length of about 6.5 mm (ssp. variipennis) and about 4.5 mm (ssp. wuermlii). They have a narrow, elongated body, speckled with light and dark. The head and pronotum have a green metallic shine. The dorsal surface is mostly dull, with a few single, long setae.

== Subspecies ==
- Gynaecoserica variipennis variipennis (Himalaya, from eastern central Nepal to the Darjeeling-Sikkim area)
- Gynaecoserica variipennis wuermlii (Frey, 1972) (Bhutan)
