= Gynaecoserica digna =

Scientific classification
- Kingdom: Animalia
- Phylum: Arthropoda
- Class: Insecta
- Order: Coleoptera
- Suborder: Polyphaga
- Infraorder: Scarabaeiformia
- Family: Scarabaeidae
- Genus: Gynaecoserica
- Species: G. digna

Binomial name
- Gynaecoserica digna Ahrens & Fabrizi, 2009

Species of beetle

Gynaecoserica digna is a species of beetle of the family Scarabaeidae. It is found in Vietnam.

== Description ==
Adults reach a length of about 4.3 mm. They have an oval body. The surface is yellowish, with the head, pronotum and the sides of the elytra darker. The dorsal surface is shiny and sparsely setose.

== Etymology ==
The species name is derived from Latin dignus (meaning dignified or stately).
