= Gynaecoserica hirsuta =

Scientific classification
- Kingdom: Animalia
- Phylum: Arthropoda
- Class: Insecta
- Order: Coleoptera
- Suborder: Polyphaga
- Infraorder: Scarabaeiformia
- Family: Scarabaeidae
- Genus: Gynaecoserica
- Species: G. hirsuta

Binomial name
- Gynaecoserica hirsuta Ahrens & Fabrizi, 2009

Species of beetle

Gynaecoserica hirsuta is a species of beetle of the family Scarabaeidae. It is found in Laos and Vietnam.

== Description ==
Adults reach a length of about 3.9 mm. They have an oblong–oval body. The surface is yellowish brown, and the dorsal surface, except for the head, is dull and densely and erectly setose.

== Etymology ==
The species name is derived from Latin hirsutus and refers to the densely setose dorsal body surface.
