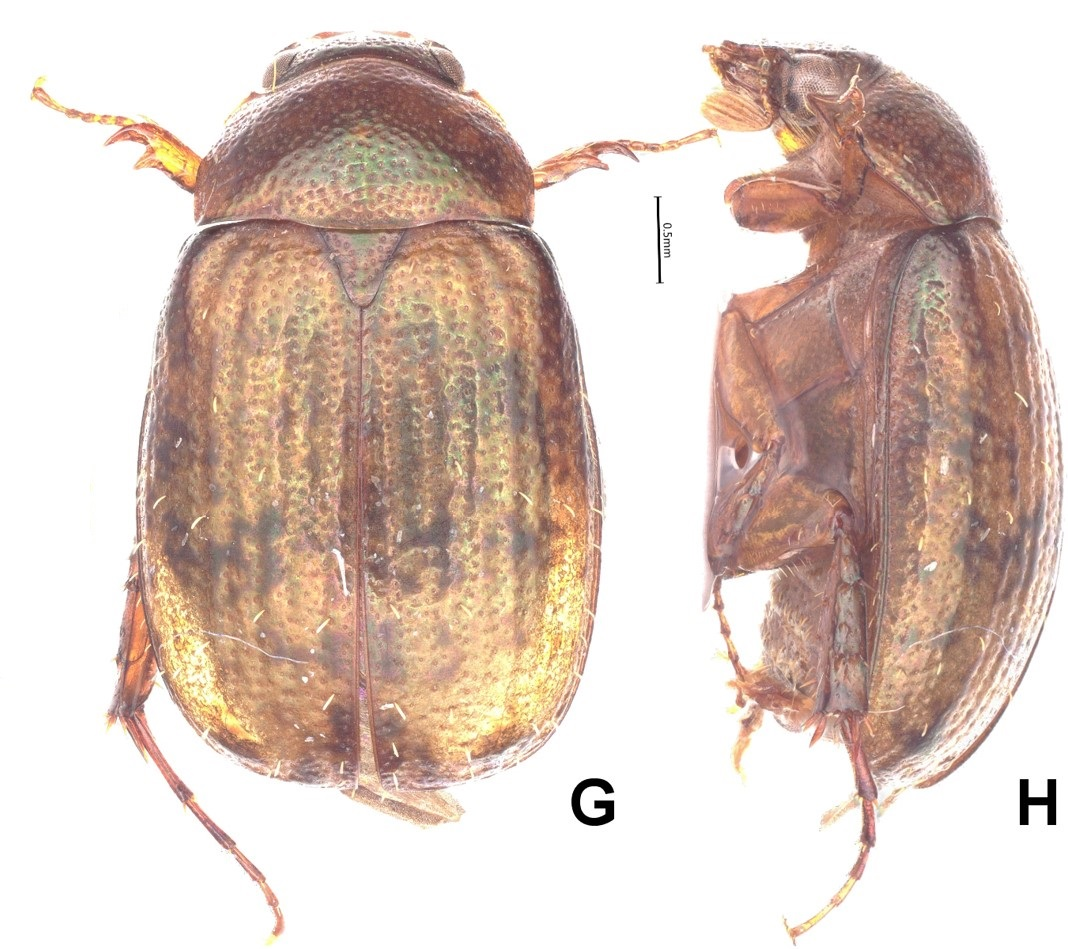

Scientific classification
- Kingdom: Animalia
- Phylum: Arthropoda
- Clade: Pancrustacea
- Class: Insecta
- Order: Coleoptera
- Suborder: Polyphaga
- Infraorder: Scarabaeiformia
- Family: Scarabaeidae
- Genus: Gynaecoserica
- Species: G. shwetharyar

Binomial name
- Gynaecoserica shwetharyar Lia Botjes & Ahrens, 2026

= Gynaecoserica shwetharyar =

Species of beetle

Gynaecoserica shwetharyar is a species of beetle of the family Scarabaeidae. It is found in Myanmar.

== Description ==
Adults reach a length of about 4.5–4.8 mm (0.18–0.19 in). They have an oblong-oval body. The surface is yellowish brown, while the frons and pronotum, as well as numerous dots on the elytra are darker, partly with a greenish iridescent shine. The dorsal surface is shiny and sparsely setose.

== Etymology ==
The species is named after its type locality, the Shwe Thar Yar village.
