= Gynaecoserica lohitensis =

Scientific classification
- Kingdom: Animalia
- Phylum: Arthropoda
- Class: Insecta
- Order: Coleoptera
- Suborder: Polyphaga
- Infraorder: Scarabaeiformia
- Family: Scarabaeidae
- Genus: Gynaecoserica
- Species: G. lohitensis

Binomial name
- Gynaecoserica lohitensis Ahrens & Fabrizi, 2009

Species of beetle

Gynaecoserica lohitensis is a species of beetle of the family Scarabaeidae. It is found in China (Sichuan, Xizang) and India (Assam).

== Description ==
Adults reach a length of about 4.5–5.3 mm. They have an oblong body. The dorsal surface is dark brown and the antennae are yellowish. The dorsal surface is dull and sparsely setose.

== Etymology ==
The species is named after its type locality, Lohit Valley.
