= Gynaecoserica krausi =

Scientific classification
- Kingdom: Animalia
- Phylum: Arthropoda
- Class: Insecta
- Order: Coleoptera
- Suborder: Polyphaga
- Infraorder: Scarabaeiformia
- Family: Scarabaeidae
- Genus: Gynaecoserica
- Species: G. krausi

Binomial name
- Gynaecoserica krausi Ahrens, 2022

Species of beetle

Gynaecoserica krausi is a species of beetle of the family Scarabaeidae. It is found in Laos.

== Description ==
Adults reach a length of about 4–4.2 mm. They have an oblong body. The dorsal surface is yellowish brown, while the antennal club, head, margins of the elytra and anterior half of the pronotum are dark brown and the legs are yellow. The dorsal surface, except for the shiny head, is dull and sparsely setose.

== Etymology ==
The species is named after its collector, Zdeněk Kraus.
