= Gynaecoserica fulgida =

Scientific classification
- Kingdom: Animalia
- Phylum: Arthropoda
- Class: Insecta
- Order: Coleoptera
- Suborder: Polyphaga
- Infraorder: Scarabaeiformia
- Family: Scarabaeidae
- Genus: Gynaecoserica
- Species: G. fulgida

Binomial name
- Gynaecoserica fulgida (Arrow, 1946)

Synonyms
- Leuroserica fulgida Arrow, 1946

Species of beetle

Gynaecoserica fulgida is a species of beetle of the family Scarabaeidae. It is found in India (Sikkim, Darjeeling).

== Description ==
Adults reach a length of about 4.8–5 mm. They have a yellow-brown, oval body. The upper surface is very glossy and glabrous except for a few hairs on the head and lateral marginal ciliations of the pronotum and elytra.
