= Gynaecoserica tawangensis =

Scientific classification
- Kingdom: Animalia
- Phylum: Arthropoda
- Class: Insecta
- Order: Coleoptera
- Suborder: Polyphaga
- Infraorder: Scarabaeiformia
- Family: Scarabaeidae
- Genus: Gynaecoserica
- Species: G. tawangensis

Binomial name
- Gynaecoserica tawangensis Ahrens & Fabrizi, 2009

Species of beetle

Gynaecoserica tawangensis is a species of beetle of the family Scarabaeidae. It is found in India (Arunachal Pradesh).

== Description ==
Adults reach a length of about 7-7.6 mm. They have an oval body. The dorsal surface is dark brown, the head, pronotum and numerous spots on the elytra are blackish and the antennae are yellowish brown (with the antennal club black). The dorsal surface is dull (with a somewhat iridescent shine) and sparsely robustly setose.

== Etymology ==
The species name is derived from its type locality, Tawang.
