= Gynaecoserica gisionensis =

Scientific classification
- Kingdom: Animalia
- Phylum: Arthropoda
- Class: Insecta
- Order: Coleoptera
- Suborder: Polyphaga
- Infraorder: Scarabaeiformia
- Family: Scarabaeidae
- Genus: Gynaecoserica
- Species: G. gisionensis

Binomial name
- Gynaecoserica gisionensis Ahrens & Fabrizi, 2009

Species of beetle

Gynaecoserica gisionensis is a species of beetle of the family Scarabaeidae. It is found in Laos.

== Description ==
Adults reach a length of about 3.5 mm. They have an oval body. The surface is reddish brown and the dorsal surface is shiny and almost glabrous.

== Etymology ==
The species name refers to the type locality, Gi Sion.
