= Gynaecoserica latesquamosa =

Scientific classification
- Kingdom: Animalia
- Phylum: Arthropoda
- Class: Insecta
- Order: Coleoptera
- Suborder: Polyphaga
- Infraorder: Scarabaeiformia
- Family: Scarabaeidae
- Genus: Gynaecoserica
- Species: G. latesquamosa

Binomial name
- Gynaecoserica latesquamosa (Frey, 1975)

Synonyms
- Lasioserica latesquamosa Frey, 1975

Species of beetle

Gynaecoserica latesquamosa is a species of beetle of the family Scarabaeidae. It is found in Bhutan.

== Description ==
Adults reach a length of about 7 mm. They have a dark brown, elongate body. The elytra are reddish-brown with dark spots. The surface is dull and moderately hairy.
