= Gynaecoserica ottoi =

Scientific classification
- Kingdom: Animalia
- Phylum: Arthropoda
- Class: Insecta
- Order: Coleoptera
- Suborder: Polyphaga
- Infraorder: Scarabaeiformia
- Family: Scarabaeidae
- Genus: Gynaecoserica
- Species: G. ottoi

Binomial name
- Gynaecoserica ottoi Ahrens, 2021

Species of beetle

Gynaecoserica ottoi is a species of beetle of the family Scarabaeidae. It is found in Laos.

== Description ==
Adults reach a length of about 5–5.9 mm. They have a yellow, oblong body. The dorsal surface is bicolored, widely yellowish brown, the pronotum with two large brown spots on the disc and the elytra with smaller brown spots forming two transversal fasciae. The antennae and legs are yellow. Except for the shiny labroclypeus, the dorsal surface is dull (with a slight iridescent shine) and sparsely setose.

== Etymology ==
The species is named after one of its collectors, Ottó Merkl.
