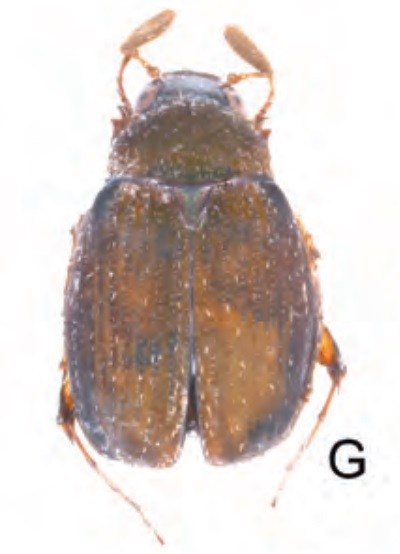

Scientific classification
- Kingdom: Animalia
- Phylum: Arthropoda
- Class: Insecta
- Order: Coleoptera
- Suborder: Polyphaga
- Infraorder: Scarabaeiformia
- Family: Scarabaeidae
- Genus: Gynaecoserica
- Species: G. etalinensis

Binomial name
- Gynaecoserica etalinensis Ahrens & Fabrizi, 2016

= Gynaecoserica etalinensis =

Species of beetle

Gynaecoserica etalinensis is a species of beetle of the family Scarabaeidae. It is found in north-eastern India.

== Description ==
Adults reach a length of about 4.8–4.9 mm. They have a light brown, oblong body. The pronotum is somewhat greenish, while the sides of the elytra are darker and the antennae are yellowish.

== Etymology ==
The species is named for its type locality, Etalin.
