= Gynaecoserica dirangensis =

Scientific classification
- Kingdom: Animalia
- Phylum: Arthropoda
- Class: Insecta
- Order: Coleoptera
- Suborder: Polyphaga
- Infraorder: Scarabaeiformia
- Family: Scarabaeidae
- Genus: Gynaecoserica
- Species: G. dirangensis

Binomial name
- Gynaecoserica dirangensis Ahrens & Fabrizi, 2009

Species of beetle

Gynaecoserica dirangensis is a species of beetle of the family Scarabaeidae. It is found in India (Arunachal Pradesh).

== Description ==
Adults reach a length of about 5.2 mm. They have an oblong body. The dorsal surface is brown with the margins of the pronotum lighter and with numerous yellowish dots on the elytra. The antennae and legs are yellowish brown. The dorsal surface is dull and very sparsely setose.

== Etymology ==
The species name refers to its type locality, Dirang.
