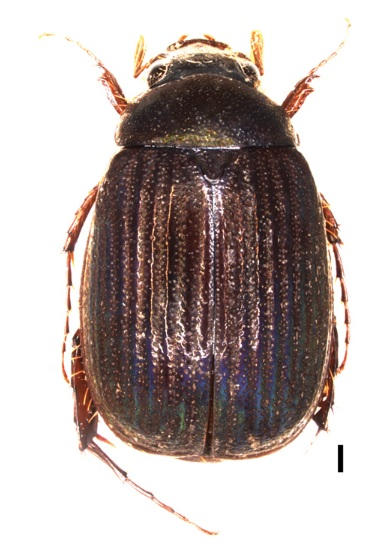

Scientific classification
- Kingdom: Animalia
- Phylum: Arthropoda
- Clade: Pancrustacea
- Class: Insecta
- Order: Coleoptera
- Suborder: Polyphaga
- Infraorder: Scarabaeiformia
- Family: Scarabaeidae
- Genus: Tetraserica
- Species: T. setuliforceps

Binomial name
- Tetraserica setuliforceps Fabrizi, Dalstein & Ahrens, 2019

= Tetraserica setuliforceps =

Species of beetle

Tetraserica setuliforceps is a species of beetle of the family Scarabaeidae. It is found in Thailand.

== Description ==
Adults reach a length of about 6.7–8.5 mm. The surface of the labroclypeus and the disc of the frons are glabrous. The smooth area anterior to the eye is twice as wide as long.

== Etymology ==
The species name is derived from Latin setulus (meaning with small setae) and forceps and refers to the setae present on the right paramere.
