= Gynaecoserica lomsakensis =

Scientific classification
- Kingdom: Animalia
- Phylum: Arthropoda
- Class: Insecta
- Order: Coleoptera
- Suborder: Polyphaga
- Infraorder: Scarabaeiformia
- Family: Scarabaeidae
- Genus: Gynaecoserica
- Species: G. lomsakensis

Binomial name
- Gynaecoserica lomsakensis Ahrens & Fabrizi, 2009

Species of beetle

Gynaecoserica lomsakensis is a species of beetle of the family Scarabaeidae. It is found in Thailand.

== Description ==
Adults reach a length of about 4.4 mm. They have an oval body. The surface is uniformly yellowish brown, with the abdomen blackish. The dorsal surface (except for the head) is dull and almost glabrous.

== Etymology ==
The species is named after the village of Lom Sak, close to the type locality.
