= Gynaecoserica lubosi =

Scientific classification
- Kingdom: Animalia
- Phylum: Arthropoda
- Class: Insecta
- Order: Coleoptera
- Suborder: Polyphaga
- Infraorder: Scarabaeiformia
- Family: Scarabaeidae
- Genus: Gynaecoserica
- Species: G. lubosi

Binomial name
- Gynaecoserica lubosi Ahrens & Fabrizi, 2009

Species of beetle

Gynaecoserica lubosi is a species of beetle of the family Scarabaeidae. It is found in India (Arunachal Pradesh).

== Description ==
Adults reach a length of about 5.8–6 mm. They have an oblong body. The dorsal surface is yellowish brown with numerous dark brown dots on the pronotum and elytra. The antennae and legs are yellowish brown. The dorsal surface dull and moderately setose.

== Etymology ==
The species is named after one of its collectors, Luboš Dembický.
