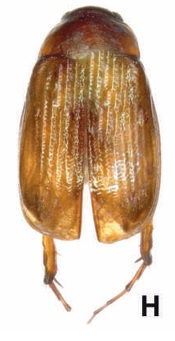

Scientific classification
- Kingdom: Animalia
- Phylum: Arthropoda
- Class: Insecta
- Order: Coleoptera
- Suborder: Polyphaga
- Infraorder: Scarabaeiformia
- Family: Scarabaeidae
- Genus: Gynaecoserica
- Species: G. hani

Binomial name
- Gynaecoserica hani Liu & Ahrens, 2014

= Gynaecoserica hani =

Species of beetle

Gynaecoserica hani is a species of beetle of the family Scarabaeidae. It is found in China (Xizang).

== Description ==
Adults reach a length of about 5.1–5.2 mm. They have a shiny, oblong body. Their body, including antennae, is yellowish brown, while the pronotum, frons and metasternum are darker. The dorsal surface is glabrous, except for a few setae on the head.

== Etymology ==
The species is named after its collector, Han Yinheng.
