= Gynaecoserica amara =

Scientific classification
- Kingdom: Animalia
- Phylum: Arthropoda
- Class: Insecta
- Order: Coleoptera
- Suborder: Polyphaga
- Infraorder: Scarabaeiformia
- Family: Scarabaeidae
- Genus: Gynaecoserica
- Species: G. amara

Binomial name
- Gynaecoserica amara Ahrens & Fabrizi, 2009

Species of beetle

Gynaecoserica amara is a species of beetle of the family Scarabaeidae. It is found in China (Yunnan).

== Description ==
Adults reach a length of about 4.8–5.3 mm. They have an oblong body. The dorsal surface is dark brown, while the antennae are yellowish brown. The dorsal surface is dull and very sparsely setose.

== Etymology ==
The species name is derived from Latin amara (meaning bitter or acid).
