= Gynaecoserica luteata =

Scientific classification
- Kingdom: Animalia
- Phylum: Arthropoda
- Class: Insecta
- Order: Coleoptera
- Suborder: Polyphaga
- Infraorder: Scarabaeiformia
- Family: Scarabaeidae
- Genus: Gynaecoserica
- Species: G. luteata

Binomial name
- Gynaecoserica luteata Ahrens & Fabrizi, 2009

Species of beetle

Gynaecoserica luteata is a species of beetle of the family Scarabaeidae. It is found in Laos and Vietnam.

== Description ==
Adults reach a length of about 4 mm. They have an oval body. The surface is yellowish brown, with the disc of the pronotum and side of the elytra widely darker. The legs and labroclypeus are yellowish. The dorsal surface (except for the head) is moderately dull and sparsely setose.

== Etymology ==
The species name is derived from Latin luteata (meaning of yellowish colour).
