= Gynaecoserica =

Scientific classification
- Kingdom: Animalia
- Phylum: Arthropoda
- Clade: Pancrustacea
- Class: Insecta
- Order: Coleoptera
- Suborder: Polyphaga
- Infraorder: Scarabaeiformia
- Family: Scarabaeidae
- Subfamily: Sericinae
- Tribe: Sericini
- Genus: Gynaecoserica; Brenske, 1896

Synonyms
- Chaetoserica Brenske, 1896; Leuroserica Arrow, 1946; Paragynaecoserica Khan & Ghai, 1982

Genus of leaf beetles

Gynaecoserica is a genus of beetles that belongs to the family Scarabaeidae.

== Species ==
- Gynaecoserica alma Ahrens & Fabrizi, 2009
- Gynaecoserica amara Ahrens & Fabrizi, 2009
- Gynaecoserica aniniensis Ahrens & Fabrizi, 2011
- Gynaecoserica annuliforceps Ahrens & Fabrizi, 2009
- Gynaecoserica arunachalensis Ahrens & Fabrizi, 2009
- Gynaecoserica barclayi Ahrens & Fabrizi, 2009
- Gynaecoserica bicolorata Ahrens & Fabrizi, 2009
- Gynaecoserica bihtanensis Ahrens, 2021
- Gynaecoserica bocaki Ahrens & Fabrizi, 2009
- Gynaecoserica bomdilana Ahrens & Fabrizi, 2009
- Gynaecoserica compacta Ahrens & Fabrizi, 2009
- Gynaecoserica cymosa (Brenske, 1896)
- Gynaecoserica densipunctata Ahrens & Fabrizi, 2009
- Gynaecoserica digna Ahrens & Fabrizi, 2009
- Gynaecoserica dirangensis Ahrens & Fabrizi, 2009
- Gynaecoserica etalinensis Ahrens & Fabrizi, 2016
- Gynaecoserica exilis Ahrens & Fabrizi, 2009
- Gynaecoserica fallaciosa Ahrens, 2021
- Gynaecoserica felina (Arrow, 1946)
- Gynaecoserica feresimplex Ahrens, 2021
- Gynaecoserica fulgida (Arrow, 1946)
- Gynaecoserica gisionensis Ahrens & Fabrizi, 2009
- Gynaecoserica gogonaica Ahrens, 1999
- Gynaecoserica hani Liu & Ahrens, 2014
- Gynaecoserica hirsuta Ahrens & Fabrizi, 2009
- Gynaecoserica ignobilis Ahrens & Fabrizi, 2009
- Gynaecoserica jelineki Ahrens & Fabrizi, 2009
- Gynaecoserica keithi Ahrens & Fabrizi, 2009
- Gynaecoserica krausi Ahrens, 2022
- Gynaecoserica lateralis (Arrow, 1946)
- Gynaecoserica latesquamosa (Frey, 1975)
- Gynaecoserica lobiceps Ahrens & Fabrizi, 2009
- Gynaecoserica lohitensis Ahrens & Fabrizi, 2009
- Gynaecoserica loisau Lia Botjes & Dirk Ahrens, 2026
- Gynaecoserica lomsakensis Ahrens & Fabrizi, 2009
- Gynaecoserica lubosi Ahrens & Fabrizi, 2009
- Gynaecoserica luteata Ahrens & Fabrizi, 2009
- Gynaecoserica maekasana Ahrens & Fabrizi, 2009
- Gynaecoserica marginipes (Brenske, 1896)
- Gynaecoserica maymyoensis Ahrens & Fabrizi, 2009
- Gynaecoserica motuoensis Liu & Ahrens, 2017
- Gynaecoserica nahangensis Ahrens & Fabrizi, 2009
- Gynaecoserica namtamaiensis Ahrens & Fabrizi, 2009
- Gynaecoserica obfuscata Ahrens, 2022
- Gynaecoserica obliqua Ahrens & Fabrizi, 2009
- Gynaecoserica ottoi Ahrens, 2021
- Gynaecoserica pellecta Brenske, 1896
- Gynaecoserica perdita Ahrens, 2004
- Gynaecoserica pseudocymosa Ahrens, 2021
- Gynaecoserica rostrata Ahrens & Fabrizi, 2009
- Gynaecoserica schima Ahrens & Fabrizi, 2009
- Gynaecoserica seinghkuensis Ahrens & Fabrizi, 2009
- Gynaecoserica shwetharyar Lia Botjes & Dirk Ahrens, 2026
- Gynaecoserica singhikensis Ahrens, 2004
- Gynaecoserica stemmleri (Frey, 1975)
- Gynaecoserica tawangensis Ahrens & Fabrizi, 2009
- Gynaecoserica tumba Ahrens, 2004
- Gynaecoserica variipennis (Moser, 1916)
- Gynaecoserica victori Ahrens & Fabrizi, 2011
- Gynaecoserica vogleri Ahrens & Fabrizi, 2009
- Gynaecoserica yigongensis Liu & Ahrens, 2014
- Gynaecoserica ziyardamensis Ahrens & Fabrizi, 2009
