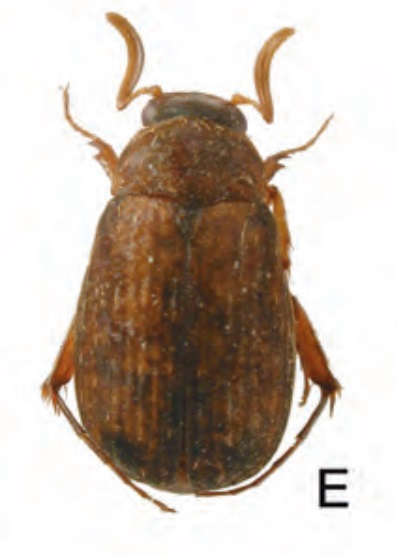

Scientific classification
- Kingdom: Animalia
- Phylum: Arthropoda
- Class: Insecta
- Order: Coleoptera
- Suborder: Polyphaga
- Infraorder: Scarabaeiformia
- Family: Scarabaeidae
- Genus: Gynaecoserica
- Species: G. tumba

Binomial name
- Gynaecoserica tumba Ahrens, 2004

= Gynaecoserica tumba =

Species of beetle

Gynaecoserica tumba is a species of beetle of the family Scarabaeidae. It is found in western Sikkim.

== Description ==
Adults reach a length of about 5.4–6 mm. They have a light brown, elongate-oval body. The sides of the elytra, as well as some small spots on the elytra are darker and the pronotum has a slightly green metallic sheen. The upper surface is dull with some hairs except on the shiny forehead.

== Etymology ==
The species name is derived from the Sikkimese Bhutia language word Tumba (the beer brewed by local monks).
