= Gynaecoserica barclayi =

Scientific classification
- Kingdom: Animalia
- Phylum: Arthropoda
- Class: Insecta
- Order: Coleoptera
- Suborder: Polyphaga
- Infraorder: Scarabaeiformia
- Family: Scarabaeidae
- Genus: Gynaecoserica
- Species: G. barclayi

Binomial name
- Gynaecoserica barclayi Ahrens & Fabrizi, 2009

Species of beetle

Gynaecoserica barclayi is a species of beetle of the family Scarabaeidae. It is found in Myanmar.

== Description ==
Adults reach a length of about 4.8 mm. They have an oblong-oval body. The surface is yellowish brown, the elytra with small irregular brown spots. The dorsal surface is shiny and sparsely setose.

== Etymology ==
The species is named in honour of Max Barclay (BNMH).
