= Gynaecoserica gogonaica =

Scientific classification
- Kingdom: Animalia
- Phylum: Arthropoda
- Class: Insecta
- Order: Coleoptera
- Suborder: Polyphaga
- Infraorder: Scarabaeiformia
- Family: Scarabaeidae
- Genus: Gynaecoserica
- Species: G. gogonaica

Binomial name
- Gynaecoserica gogonaica Ahrens, 1999

Species of beetle

Gynaecoserica gogonaica is a species of beetle of the family Scarabaeidae. It is found in Bhutan.

== Description ==
Adults reach a length of about 6.6 mm. They have a chestnut, oblong body. The dorsal surface is strongly iridescent and sparsely covered with white hairs.
