= Gynaecoserica marginipes =

Scientific classification
- Kingdom: Animalia
- Phylum: Arthropoda
- Class: Insecta
- Order: Coleoptera
- Suborder: Polyphaga
- Infraorder: Scarabaeiformia
- Family: Scarabaeidae
- Genus: Gynaecoserica
- Species: G. marginipes

Binomial name
- Gynaecoserica marginipes (Brenske, 1896)

Synonyms
- Serica marginipes Brenske, 1896; Microserica marginipes; Neoserica marginipes

Species of beetle

Gynaecoserica marginipes is a species of beetle of the family Scarabaeidae. It is found in the hills and mountainous areas from eastern Nepal to Bhutan.

== Description ==
Adults reach a length of about 4.1-4.3 mm. They have an oval body, which is blackish-brown beneath and yellowish-brown above. Some areas, such as the disc of the pronotum and margins of the elytra are darker. They are mostly dull and glabrous.
