= Gynaecoserica fallaciosa =

Scientific classification
- Kingdom: Animalia
- Phylum: Arthropoda
- Class: Insecta
- Order: Coleoptera
- Suborder: Polyphaga
- Infraorder: Scarabaeiformia
- Family: Scarabaeidae
- Genus: Gynaecoserica
- Species: G. fallaciosa

Binomial name
- Gynaecoserica fallaciosa Ahrens, 2021

Species of beetle

Gynaecoserica fallaciosa is a species of beetle of the family Scarabaeidae. It is found in Thailand.

== Description ==
Adults reach a length of about 3.7–4.2 mm. They have an oblong body. The dorsal surface is yellowish brown, with the head dark greenish brown and the lateral margins of the elytra blackish. The antennae and legs are yellow. Except for the shiny head, the dorsal surface is dull and sparsely setose.

== Etymology ==
The species name is derived from Latin fallaciosus (meaning deceptive).
