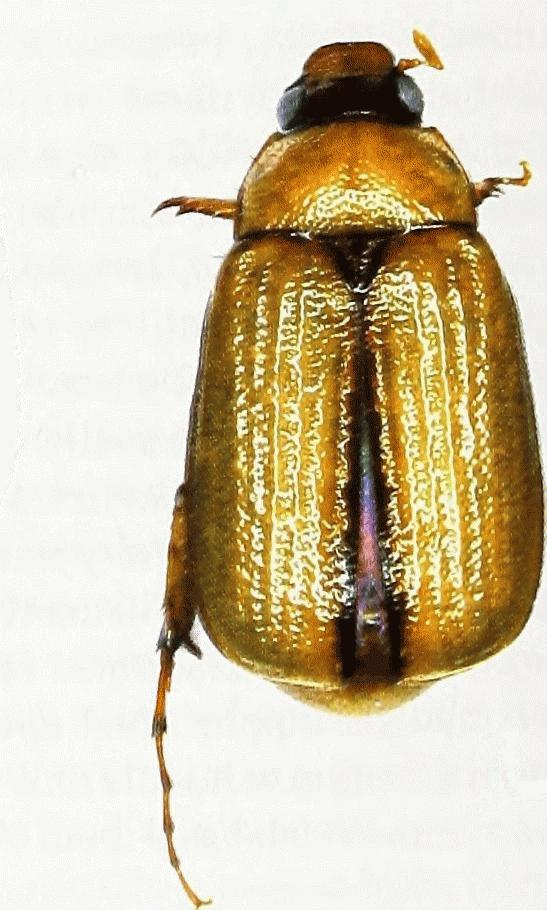

Scientific classification
- Kingdom: Animalia
- Phylum: Arthropoda
- Class: Insecta
- Order: Coleoptera
- Suborder: Polyphaga
- Infraorder: Scarabaeiformia
- Family: Scarabaeidae
- Genus: Gynaecoserica
- Species: G. aniniensis

Binomial name
- Gynaecoserica aniniensis Ahrens & Fabrizi, 2011

= Gynaecoserica aniniensis =

Species of beetle

Gynaecoserica aniniensis is a species of beetle of the family Scarabaeidae. It is found in India (Arunachal Pradesh).

== Description ==
Adults reach a length of about 6 mm. They have an entirely yellowish, oblong oval body, but darker behind the eyes and along the basal margin of the pronotum and lateral margins of the elytra. The dorsal surface is shiny and sparsely setose.

== Etymology ==
The species name refers to the type locality, Anini.
