= Gynaecoserica jelineki =

Scientific classification
- Kingdom: Animalia
- Phylum: Arthropoda
- Clade: Pancrustacea
- Class: Insecta
- Order: Coleoptera
- Suborder: Polyphaga
- Infraorder: Scarabaeiformia
- Family: Scarabaeidae
- Genus: Gynaecoserica
- Species: G. jelineki

Binomial name
- Gynaecoserica jelineki Ahrens & Fabrizi, 2009

Species of beetle

Gynaecoserica jelineki is a species of beetle of the family Scarabaeidae. It is found in Malaysia and Thailand.

== Description ==
Adults reach a length of about 4.2 mm. They have an oval body. The dorsal surface is dark brown and the antennae are yellowish. The dorsal surface is dull and glabrous.

== Etymology ==
The species is named in honour of Josef Jelínek.
