= Gynaecoserica densipunctata =

Scientific classification
- Kingdom: Animalia
- Phylum: Arthropoda
- Class: Insecta
- Order: Coleoptera
- Suborder: Polyphaga
- Infraorder: Scarabaeiformia
- Family: Scarabaeidae
- Genus: Gynaecoserica
- Species: G. densipunctata

Binomial name
- Gynaecoserica densipunctata Ahrens & Fabrizi, 2009

Species of beetle

Gynaecoserica densipunctata is a species of beetle of the family Scarabaeidae. It is found in Thailand.

== Description ==
Adults reach a length of about 4–4.1 mm. They have an oval body. The surface is dark reddish brown, the labroclypeus is reddish and the legs are yellowish. The dorsal surface, except the head, is dull and sparsely setose.

== Etymology ==
The species name is derived from Latin densus and punctatus (meaning densely punctate) and refers to the punctation of the dorsal surface.
