= Gynaecoserica seinghkuensis =

Scientific classification
- Kingdom: Animalia
- Phylum: Arthropoda
- Class: Insecta
- Order: Coleoptera
- Suborder: Polyphaga
- Infraorder: Scarabaeiformia
- Family: Scarabaeidae
- Genus: Gynaecoserica
- Species: G. seinghkuensis

Binomial name
- Gynaecoserica seinghkuensis Ahrens & Fabrizi, 2009

Species of beetle

Gynaecoserica seinghkuensis is a species of beetle of the family Scarabaeidae. It is found in Myanmar.

== Description ==
Adults reach a length of about 5.1–5.2 mm. They have an oblong body. The dorsal surface is reddish brown, with the frons, a median spot on the anterior half of the pronotum, scutellum and ventral surface dark brown. The antennae areyellowish. The dorsal surface is dull and densely and robustly setose.

== Etymology ==
The species name refers to the Seinghku valley, where the type locality is situated.
