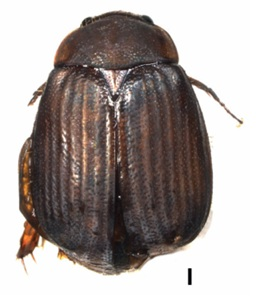

Scientific classification
- Kingdom: Animalia
- Phylum: Arthropoda
- Class: Insecta
- Order: Coleoptera
- Suborder: Polyphaga
- Infraorder: Scarabaeiformia
- Family: Scarabaeidae
- Genus: Neoserica
- Species: N. sigillata

Binomial name
- Neoserica sigillata (Brenske, 1898)

Synonyms
- Microserica sigillata Brenske, 1898

= Neoserica sigillata =

Species of beetle

Neoserica sigillata is a species of beetle of the family Scarabaeidae. It is found in China (Fujian, Zhejiang).

== Description ==
Adults reach a length of about 5.1 mm. They have a dark reddish brown, oblong body. The antennal club and margins of the pronotum are yellowish brown. The dorsal surface is dull and nearly glabrous and the labroclypeus and anterior two thirds of the frons are shiny.
