= Gynaecoserica cymosa =

Scientific classification
- Kingdom: Animalia
- Phylum: Arthropoda
- Class: Insecta
- Order: Coleoptera
- Suborder: Polyphaga
- Infraorder: Scarabaeiformia
- Family: Scarabaeidae
- Genus: Gynaecoserica
- Species: G. cymosa

Binomial name
- Gynaecoserica cymosa (Brenske, 1896)

Synonyms
- Chaetoserica cymosa Brenske, 1896; Paragynaecoserica pubescens Khan & Ghai, 1982

Species of beetle

Gynaecoserica cymosa is a species of beetle of the family Scarabaeidae. It is found in India (Assam, West Bengal, Sikkim) and Bhutan.

== Description ==
Adults reach a length of about 3.5-3.9 mm. They have a reddish to dark brown, short body, partly speckled with green. The dorsal surface has a few light setae.
