= Maladera hongkongica =

Scientific classification
- Kingdom: Animalia
- Phylum: Arthropoda
- Class: Insecta
- Order: Coleoptera
- Suborder: Polyphaga
- Infraorder: Scarabaeiformia
- Family: Scarabaeidae
- Genus: Maladera
- Species: M. hongkongica

Binomial name
- Maladera hongkongica (Brenske, 1899)

Synonyms
- Autoserica hongkongica Brenske, 1899

Species of beetle

Maladera hongkongica is a species of beetle of the family Scarabaeidae. It is found in China (Guangdong, Hong Kong, Yunnan), Thailand and Vietnam.

== Description ==
Adults reach a length of about 10.1 mm. They have a dark brown, oblong-oval body. The antennae are yellowish. The surface is glabrous and dull (but the labroclypeus is shiny).
