= Paramere =

Part of the external reproductive organs of male insects

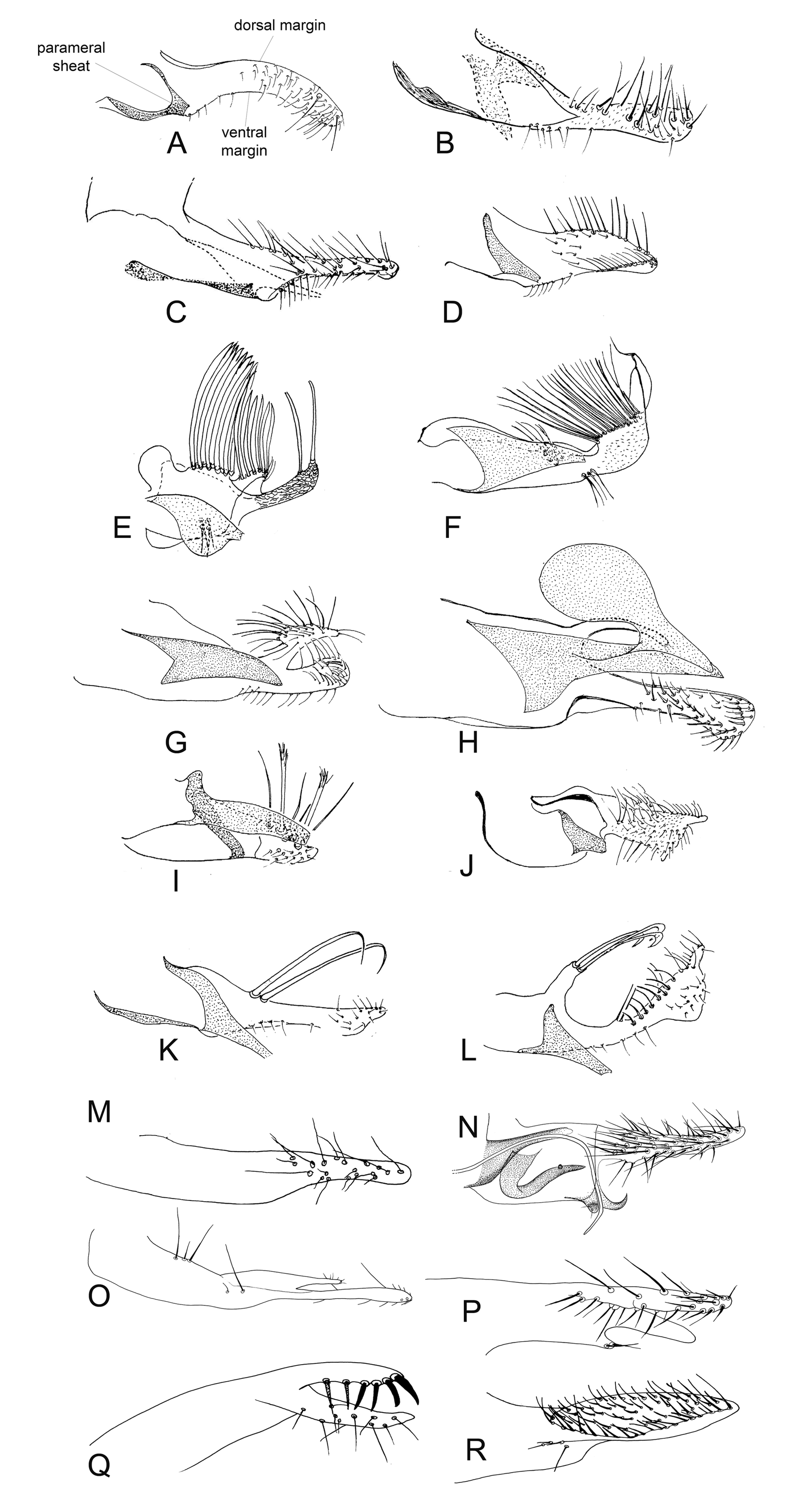
Variety of paramere structures in Phlebotominae (Diptera, Psychodidae)

Parameres ("side parts") are part of the external reproductive organs of male insects. The term was first used by Verhoeff in 1893 for the lateral genital lobes in Coleoptera. The primary phallic lobes which appear in the nymph or larval stages may become a pair of penes in the Ephemeroptera or a simple median penis in the Thysanura. In higher insect orders from Orthoptera to Hymenoptera, each of the primary lobes is divided into two secondary lobes or phallomeres, termed parameres and mesomeres (this use of the term "mesomere" is not to be confused with the same term in segmentation embryology). In adult insects, parameres may elongate and become genital claspers. These claspers may themselves occur in two segments, forming a proximal basimere and a distal telomere or harpago ("grappling hook").

The morphology of insect genitalia displays enormous diversity and consequently has become of prime importance in taxonomy or the classification of insects by their affinities.
