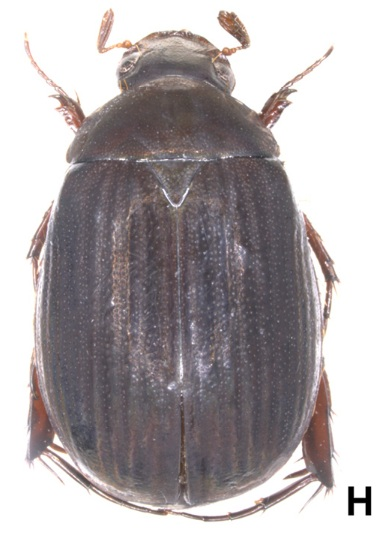

Scientific classification
- Kingdom: Animalia
- Phylum: Arthropoda
- Clade: Pancrustacea
- Class: Insecta
- Order: Coleoptera
- Suborder: Polyphaga
- Infraorder: Scarabaeiformia
- Family: Scarabaeidae
- Genus: Tetraserica
- Species: T. pseudoruiliensis

Binomial name
- Tetraserica pseudoruiliensis Fabrizi, Dalstein & Ahrens, 2019

= Tetraserica pseudoruiliensis =

Species of beetle

Tetraserica pseudoruiliensis is a species of beetle of the family Scarabaeidae. It is found in Laos, Myanmar and Thailand.

== Description ==
Adults reach a length of about 10–10.5 mm. The surface of the labroclypeus and the disc of the frons are glabrous. The smooth area anterior to the eye is twice as wide as long.

== Etymology ==
The species name is derived from Greek pseudo- (meaning false) and the species name ruiliensis and refers to its similarity to Tetraserica ruiliensis.
