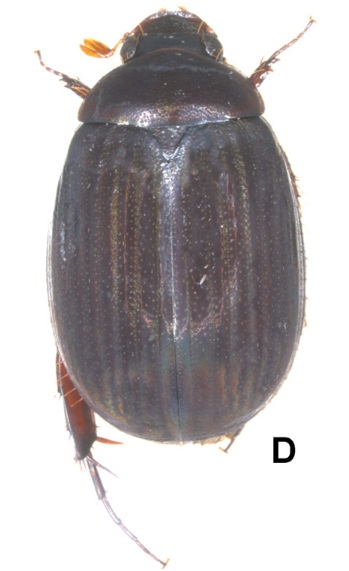

Scientific classification
- Kingdom: Animalia
- Phylum: Arthropoda
- Clade: Pancrustacea
- Class: Insecta
- Order: Coleoptera
- Suborder: Polyphaga
- Infraorder: Scarabaeiformia
- Family: Scarabaeidae
- Genus: Tetraserica
- Species: T. semiruiliensis

Binomial name
- Tetraserica semiruiliensis Fabrizi, Dalstein & Ahrens, 2019

= Tetraserica semiruiliensis =

Species of beetle

Tetraserica semiruiliensis is a species of beetle of the family Scarabaeidae. It is found in Cambodia and Thailand.

== Description ==
Adults reach a length of about 9.5–10 mm. The surface of the labroclypeus and the disc of the frons are glabrous. The smooth area anterior to the eye is twice as wide as long.

== Etymology ==
The species name is derived from Latin semi- (meaning half) and the species name ruiliensis and refers to its similarity to Tetraserica ruiliensis.
