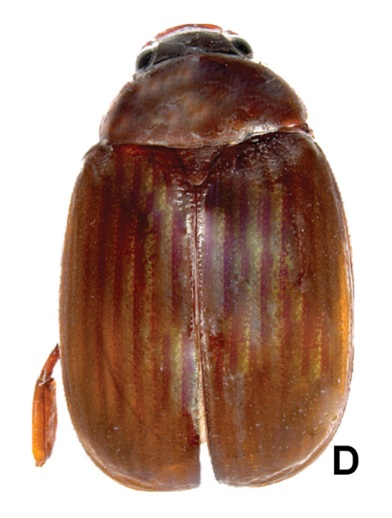

Scientific classification
- Kingdom: Animalia
- Phylum: Arthropoda
- Clade: Pancrustacea
- Class: Insecta
- Order: Coleoptera
- Suborder: Polyphaga
- Infraorder: Scarabaeiformia
- Family: Scarabaeidae
- Genus: Tetraserica
- Species: T. ruiliensis

Binomial name
- Tetraserica ruiliensis Liu, Fabrizi, Bai, Yang & Ahrens, 2014

= Tetraserica ruiliensis =

Species of beetle

Tetraserica ruiliensis is a species of beetle of the family Scarabaeidae. It is found in China (Yunnan), Thailand and Vietnam.

== Description ==
Adults reach a length of about 8.1 mm. The surface of the labroclypeus and the disc of the frons are glabrous. The smooth area anterior to the eye is twice as wide as long.

== Etymology ==
The species is named after its type locality, Ruili.
