= Tetraserica similis =

Scientific classification
- Kingdom: Animalia
- Phylum: Arthropoda
- Class: Insecta
- Order: Coleoptera
- Suborder: Polyphaga
- Infraorder: Scarabaeiformia
- Family: Scarabaeidae
- Genus: Tetraserica
- Species: T. similis

Binomial name
- Tetraserica similis Ahrens, Pacholátko & Pham, 2025

Species of beetle

Tetraserica similis is a species of beetle of the family Scarabaeidae. It is found in Laos and Thailand.

== Description ==
Adults reach a length of about 8.9–10.3 mm. The dorsal surface is dark brown and glabrous, the pronotum with a weak greenish shine. The ventral surface and the legs are reddish brown and the antennae are yellow.

== Etymology ==
The species name is derived from Latin similis (meaning similar) and refers to its strong resemblance with Tetraserica pingjiangensis.
