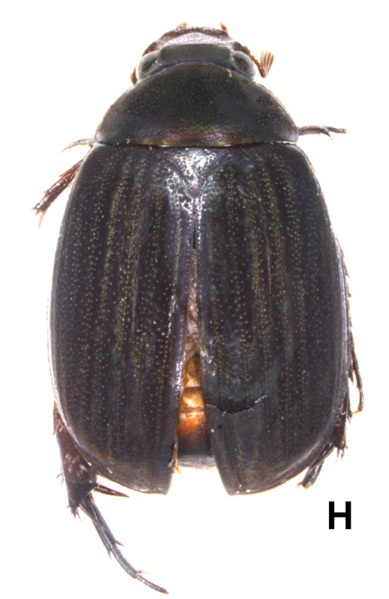

Scientific classification
- Kingdom: Animalia
- Phylum: Arthropoda
- Clade: Pancrustacea
- Class: Insecta
- Order: Coleoptera
- Suborder: Polyphaga
- Infraorder: Scarabaeiformia
- Family: Scarabaeidae
- Genus: Tetraserica
- Species: T. semipingjiangensis

Binomial name
- Tetraserica semipingjiangensis Fabrizi, Dalstein & Ahrens, 2019

= Tetraserica semipingjiangensis =

Species of beetle

Tetraserica semipingjiangensis is a species of beetle of the family Scarabaeidae. It is found in Thailand.

== Description ==
Adults reach a length of about 9.6 mm. The surface of the labroclypeus and the disc of the frons are glabrous. The smooth area anterior to the eye is twice as wide as long.

== Etymology ==
The species name is derived from Latin semi (meaning half) and the species name pingjiangensis and refers to its similarity to Tetraserica pingjiangensis.
