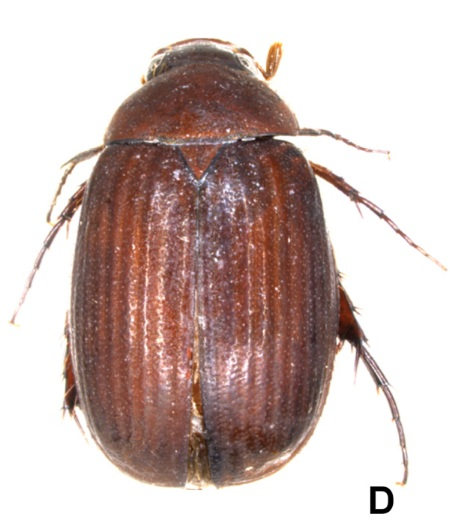

Scientific classification
- Kingdom: Animalia
- Phylum: Arthropoda
- Clade: Pancrustacea
- Class: Insecta
- Order: Coleoptera
- Suborder: Polyphaga
- Infraorder: Scarabaeiformia
- Family: Scarabaeidae
- Genus: Tetraserica
- Species: T. pingjiangensis

Binomial name
- Tetraserica pingjiangensis Liu, Fabrizi, Bai, Yang & Ahrens, 2014

= Tetraserica pingjiangensis =

Species of beetle

Tetraserica pingjiangensis is a species of beetle of the family Scarabaeidae. It is found in China (Guangxi, Hubei, Hunan, Yunnan), Cambodia, Laos, Myanmar, Thailand and Vietnam.

== Description ==
Adults reach a length of about 8.8–10 mm. The surface of the labroclypeus and the disc of the frons are glabrous. The smooth area anterior to the eye is twice as wide as long.

== Etymology ==
The species is named after its type locality, Pingjiang.
