= Tetraserica paraspinicrus =

Scientific classification
- Kingdom: Animalia
- Phylum: Arthropoda
- Class: Insecta
- Order: Coleoptera
- Suborder: Polyphaga
- Infraorder: Scarabaeiformia
- Family: Scarabaeidae
- Genus: Tetraserica
- Species: T. paraspinicrus

Binomial name
- Tetraserica paraspinicrus Ahrens, Pacholátko & Pham, 2025

Species of beetle

Tetraserica paraspinicrus is a species of beetle of the family Scarabaeidae. It is found in Laos.

== Description ==
Adults reach a length of about 7.5–8.5 mm. The dorsal surface is dark brown and glabrous. The pronotum has a weak greenish shine, the ventral surface and legs are reddish brown and the antennae are yellow.

== Etymology ==
The species name is derived from Greek para- (meaning close by) and the species name spinicrus and refers to its similarity to Tetraserica spinicrus.
