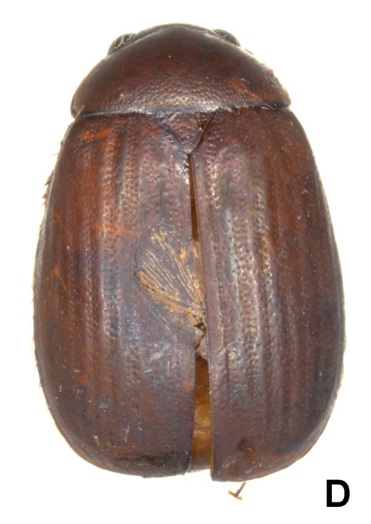

Scientific classification
- Kingdom: Animalia
- Phylum: Arthropoda
- Clade: Pancrustacea
- Class: Insecta
- Order: Coleoptera
- Suborder: Polyphaga
- Infraorder: Scarabaeiformia
- Family: Scarabaeidae
- Genus: Tetraserica
- Species: T. spinicrus

Binomial name
- Tetraserica spinicrus (Frey, 1972)

Synonyms
- Neoserica spinicrus Frey, 1972

= Tetraserica spinicrus =

Species of beetle

Tetraserica spinicrus is a species of beetle of the family Scarabaeidae. It is found in Laos and Vietnam.

== Description ==
Adults reach a length of about 9.1 mm. The surface of the labroclypeus and the disc of the frons are glabrous. The smooth area anterior to the eye is twice as wide as long.
