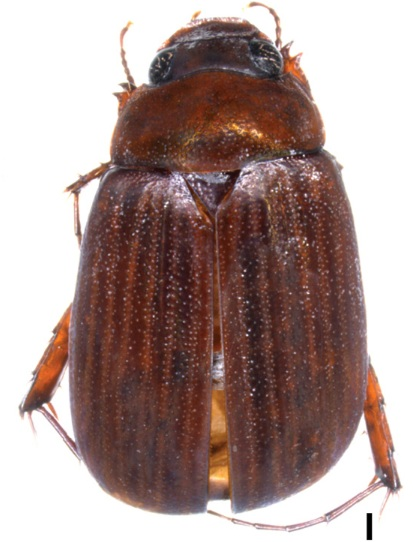

Scientific classification
- Kingdom: Animalia
- Phylum: Arthropoda
- Clade: Pancrustacea
- Class: Insecta
- Order: Coleoptera
- Suborder: Polyphaga
- Infraorder: Scarabaeiformia
- Family: Scarabaeidae
- Genus: Tetraserica
- Species: T. allomengeana

Binomial name
- Tetraserica allomengeana Fabrizi, Dalstein & Ahrens, 2019

= Tetraserica allomengeana =

Species of beetle

Tetraserica allomengeana is a species of beetle of the family Scarabaeidae. It is found in Laos.

== Description ==
Adults reach a length of about 8.1–9.1 mm. The surface of the labroclypeus and the disc of the frons are glabrous. The smooth area anterior to the eye is twice as wide as long.

== Etymology ==
The species name is derived from Greek allo- (meaning other) and the species name mengeana and refers to its similarity to Tetraserica mengeana.
