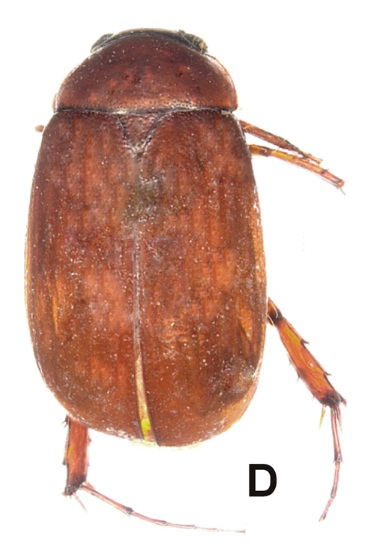

Scientific classification
- Kingdom: Animalia
- Phylum: Arthropoda
- Clade: Pancrustacea
- Class: Insecta
- Order: Coleoptera
- Suborder: Polyphaga
- Infraorder: Scarabaeiformia
- Family: Scarabaeidae
- Genus: Tetraserica
- Species: T. mengeana

Binomial name
- Tetraserica mengeana Liu, Fabrizi, Bai, Yang & Ahrens, 2014

= Tetraserica mengeana =

Species of beetle

Tetraserica mengeana is a species of beetle of the family Scarabaeidae. It is found in China (Yunnan) and Thailand.

== Description ==
Adults reach a length of about 7.4–8.6 mm. The body is reddish brown. The surface of the labroclypeus and the disc of the frons are glabrous. The smooth area anterior to the eye is twice as wide as long.

== Etymology ==
The species is named after its type locality, Meng'e.
