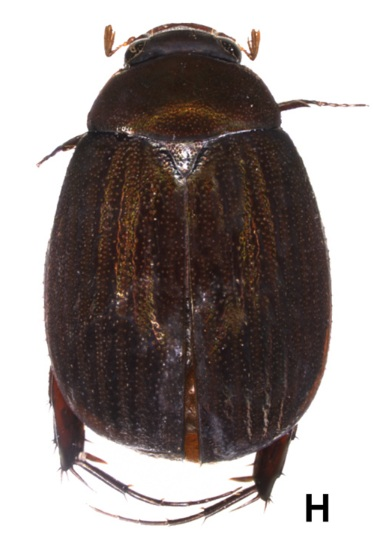

Scientific classification
- Kingdom: Animalia
- Phylum: Arthropoda
- Clade: Pancrustacea
- Class: Insecta
- Order: Coleoptera
- Suborder: Polyphaga
- Infraorder: Scarabaeiformia
- Family: Scarabaeidae
- Genus: Tetraserica
- Species: T. feresiantarensis

Binomial name
- Tetraserica feresiantarensis Fabrizi, Dalstein & Ahrens, 2019

= Tetraserica feresiantarensis =

Species of beetle

Tetraserica feresiantarensis is a species of beetle of the family Scarabaeidae. It is found in Malaysia and Thailand.

== Description ==
Adults reach a length of about 8.9–9.5 mm. The surface of the labroclypeus and the disc of the frons are glabrous. The smooth area anterior to the eye is twice as wide as long.

== Etymology ==
The species name is derived from Latin ''fere- (meaning nearly) and the species name siantarensis and refers to its similarity to Tetraserica siantarensis.
