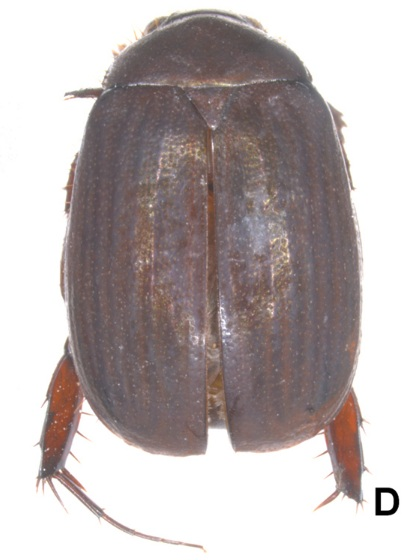

Scientific classification
- Kingdom: Animalia
- Phylum: Arthropoda
- Clade: Pancrustacea
- Class: Insecta
- Order: Coleoptera
- Suborder: Polyphaga
- Infraorder: Scarabaeiformia
- Family: Scarabaeidae
- Genus: Tetraserica
- Species: T. siantarensis

Binomial name
- Tetraserica siantarensis (Moser, 1922)

Synonyms
- Neoserica siantarensis Moser, 1922

= Tetraserica siantarensis =

Species of beetle

Tetraserica siantarensis is a species of beetle of the family Scarabaeidae. It is found in Indonesia (Sumatra) and Malaysia.

== Description ==
Adults reach a length of about 8.8 mm. The surface of the labroclypeus and the disc of the frons are glabrous. The smooth area anterior to the eye is twice as wide as long.
