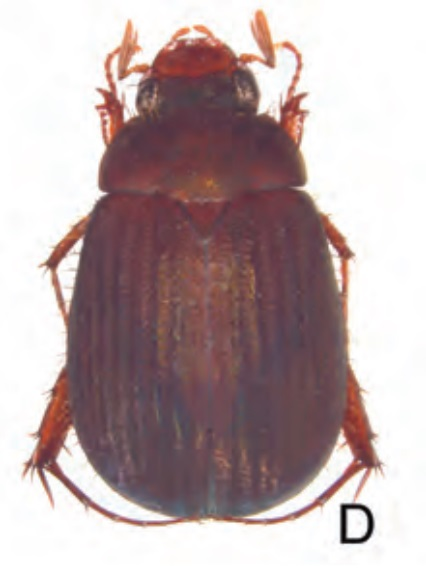

Scientific classification
- Kingdom: Animalia
- Phylum: Arthropoda
- Class: Insecta
- Order: Coleoptera
- Suborder: Polyphaga
- Infraorder: Scarabaeiformia
- Family: Scarabaeidae
- Genus: Tetraserica
- Species: T. impar

Binomial name
- Tetraserica impar Ahrens & Fabrizi, 2016

= Tetraserica impar =

Species of beetle

Tetraserica impar is a species of beetle of the family Scarabaeidae. It is found in India (Assam, Nagaland).

== Description ==
Adults reach a length of about 6.7–7.2 mm. They have a dark brown, oval body. The legs and ventral surface are reddish brown and the antennae are yellowish brown. The dorsal surface is dull and glabrous.

== Etymology ==
The species name is derived from Latin impar (meaning unequal) and refers to being different to its relative Tetraserica miniatula.
