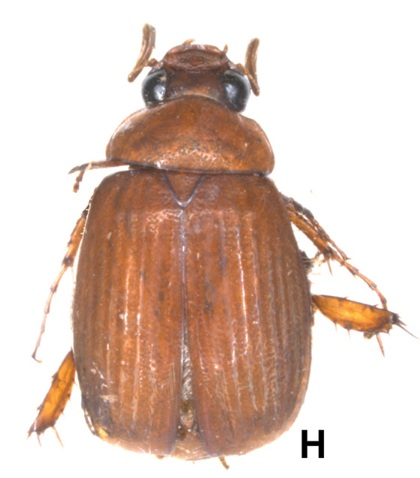

Scientific classification
- Kingdom: Animalia
- Phylum: Arthropoda
- Clade: Pancrustacea
- Class: Insecta
- Order: Coleoptera
- Suborder: Polyphaga
- Infraorder: Scarabaeiformia
- Family: Scarabaeidae
- Genus: Tetraserica
- Species: T. semishanensis

Binomial name
- Tetraserica semishanensis Fabrizi, Dalstein & Ahrens, 2019

= Tetraserica semishanensis =

Species of beetle

Tetraserica semishanensis is a species of beetle of the family Scarabaeidae. It is found in Myanmar and Thailand.

== Description ==
Adults reach a length of about 7.1–7.6 mm. The body is yellowish brown, with a darker head. The surface of the labroclypeus and the disc of the frons are glabrous. The smooth area anterior to the eye is twice as wide as long.

== Etymology ==
The species name is derived from Latin semi- (meaning half) and the species name shanensis and refers to its similarity to Tetraserica shanensis.
