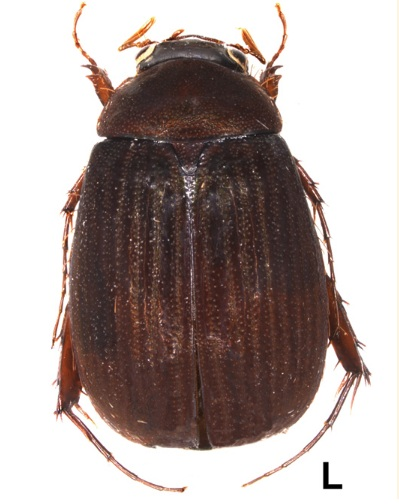

Scientific classification
- Kingdom: Animalia
- Phylum: Arthropoda
- Clade: Pancrustacea
- Class: Insecta
- Order: Coleoptera
- Suborder: Polyphaga
- Infraorder: Scarabaeiformia
- Family: Scarabaeidae
- Genus: Tetraserica
- Species: T. semidamaidiensis

Binomial name
- Tetraserica semidamaidiensis Fabrizi, Dalstein & Ahrens, 2019

= Tetraserica semidamaidiensis =

Species of beetle

Tetraserica semidamaidiensis is a species of beetle of the family Scarabaeidae. It is found in Laos.

== Description ==
Adults reach a length of about 7.8 mm. The surface of the labroclypeus and the disc of the frons are glabrous. The smooth area anterior to the eye is twice as wide as long.

== Etymology ==
The species name is derived from Latin semi- (meaning half) and the species name damadiensis and refers to the similarity to Tetraserica damaidiensis.
