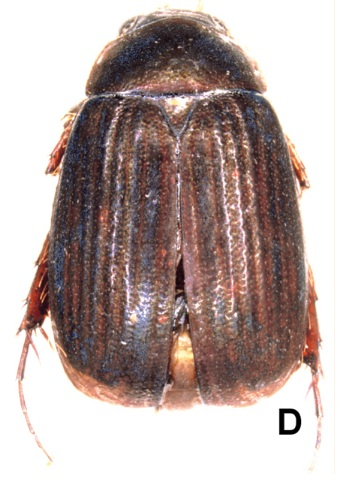

Scientific classification
- Kingdom: Animalia
- Phylum: Arthropoda
- Clade: Pancrustacea
- Class: Insecta
- Order: Coleoptera
- Suborder: Polyphaga
- Infraorder: Scarabaeiformia
- Family: Scarabaeidae
- Genus: Tetraserica
- Species: T. damaidiensis

Binomial name
- Tetraserica damaidiensis Liu, Fabrizi, Bai, Yang & Ahrens, 2014

= Tetraserica damaidiensis =

Species of beetle

Tetraserica damaidiensis is a species of beetle of the family Scarabaeidae. It is found in China (Fujian, Guangxi, Yunnan) and Vietnam.

== Description ==
Adults reach a length of about 6.9–7.6 mm. The surface of the labroclypeus and the disc of the frons are glabrous. The smooth area anterior to the eye is twice as wide as long.

== Etymology ==
The species is named after its type locality, Damaidi.
