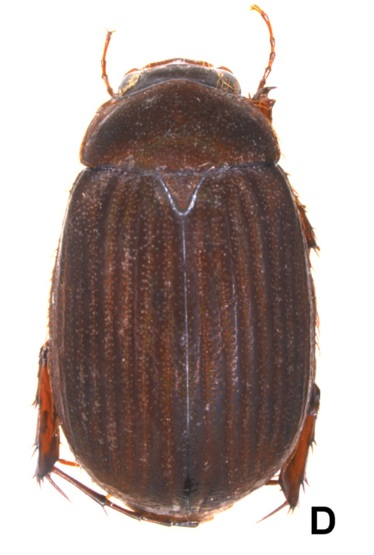

Scientific classification
- Kingdom: Animalia
- Phylum: Arthropoda
- Clade: Pancrustacea
- Class: Insecta
- Order: Coleoptera
- Suborder: Polyphaga
- Infraorder: Scarabaeiformia
- Family: Scarabaeidae
- Genus: Tetraserica
- Species: T. allosejugata

Binomial name
- Tetraserica allosejugata Fabrizi, Dalstein & Ahrens, 2019

= Tetraserica allosejugata =

Species of beetle

Tetraserica allosejugata is a species of beetle of the family Scarabaeidae. It is found in China (Yunnan) and Thailand.

== Description ==
Adults reach a length of about 7.6–8.1 mm. The surface of the labroclypeus and the disc of the frons are glabrous. The smooth area anterior to the eye is twice as wide as long.

== Etymology ==
The species name is derived from Greek allo- (meaning nearly) and the species name sejugata and refers to the similarity to Tetraserica sejugata.
