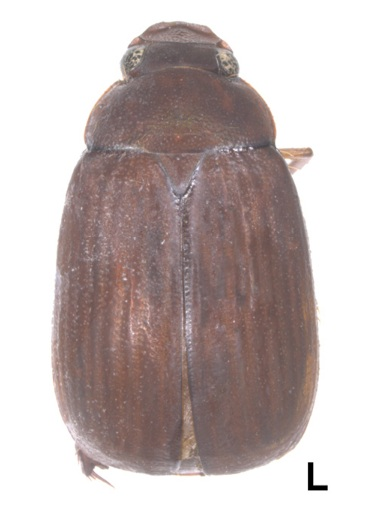

Scientific classification
- Kingdom: Animalia
- Phylum: Arthropoda
- Clade: Pancrustacea
- Class: Insecta
- Order: Coleoptera
- Suborder: Polyphaga
- Infraorder: Scarabaeiformia
- Family: Scarabaeidae
- Genus: Tetraserica
- Species: T. sejugata

Binomial name
- Tetraserica sejugata (Brenske, 1899)

Synonyms
- Serica sejugata Brenske, 1899

= Tetraserica sejugata =

Species of beetle

Tetraserica sejugata is a species of beetle of the family Scarabaeidae. It is found in Myanmar.

== Description ==
Adults reach a length of about 8.4 mm. The surface of the labroclypeus and the disc of the frons are glabrous. The smooth area anterior to the eye is twice as wide as long.
