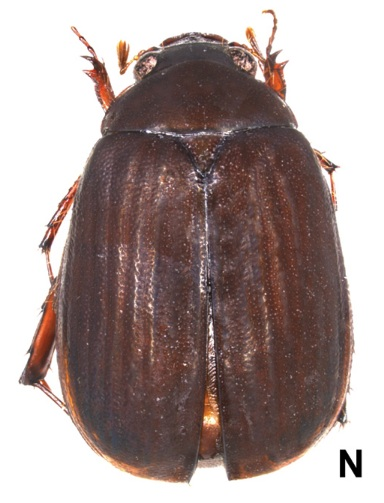

Scientific classification
- Kingdom: Animalia
- Phylum: Arthropoda
- Clade: Pancrustacea
- Class: Insecta
- Order: Coleoptera
- Suborder: Polyphaga
- Infraorder: Scarabaeiformia
- Family: Scarabaeidae
- Genus: Tetraserica
- Species: T. paratonkinensis

Binomial name
- Tetraserica paratonkinensis Fabrizi, Dalstein & Ahrens, 2019

= Tetraserica paratonkinensis =

Species of beetle

Tetraserica paratonkinensis, is a species of beetle of the family Scarabaeidae. It is found in Vietnam.

== Description ==
Adults reach a length of about 9.5–10.2 mm. The surface of the labroclypeus and the disc of the frons are glabrous. The smooth area anterior to the eye is twice as wide as long.

== Etymology ==
The species name is derived from Greek para- (meaning close to) and the species name tonkinensis and refers to its similarity to Tetraserica tonkinensis.
