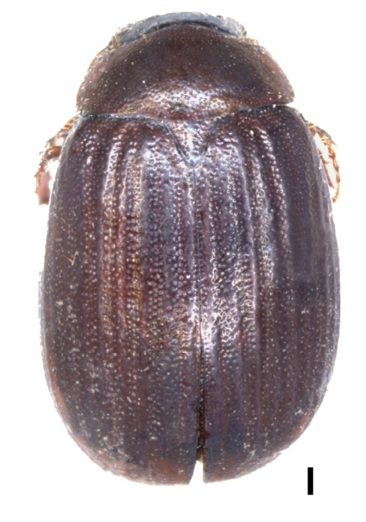

Scientific classification
- Kingdom: Animalia
- Phylum: Arthropoda
- Clade: Pancrustacea
- Class: Insecta
- Order: Coleoptera
- Suborder: Polyphaga
- Infraorder: Scarabaeiformia
- Family: Scarabaeidae
- Genus: Tetraserica
- Species: T. tonkinensis

Binomial name
- Tetraserica tonkinensis (Moser, 1908)

Synonyms
- Neoserica tonkinensis Moser, 1908

= Tetraserica tonkinensis =

Species of beetle

Tetraserica tonkinensis is a species of beetle of the family Scarabaeidae. It is found in Vietnam and China (Guangxi).

== Description ==
Adults reach a length of about 8.7–9 mm. The surface of the labroclypeus and the disc of the frons are glabrous. The smooth area anterior to the eye is twice as wide as long.
