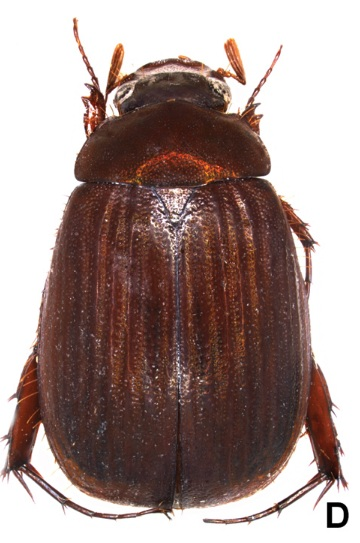

Scientific classification
- Kingdom: Animalia
- Phylum: Arthropoda
- Clade: Pancrustacea
- Class: Insecta
- Order: Coleoptera
- Suborder: Polyphaga
- Infraorder: Scarabaeiformia
- Family: Scarabaeidae
- Genus: Tetraserica
- Species: T. pseudoliangheensis

Binomial name
- Tetraserica pseudoliangheensis Fabrizi, Dalstein & Ahrens, 2019

= Tetraserica pseudoliangheensis =

Species of beetle

Tetraserica pseudoliangheensis is a species of beetle of the family Scarabaeidae. It is found in Laos.

== Description ==
Adults reach a length of about 10.1 mm. The surface of the labroclypeus and the disc of the frons are glabrous. The smooth area anterior to the eye is twice as wide as long.

== Etymology ==
The species name is derived from Latin pseudo- (meaning nearly) and the species name liangheensis and refers to the similarity to Tetraserica liangheensis.
