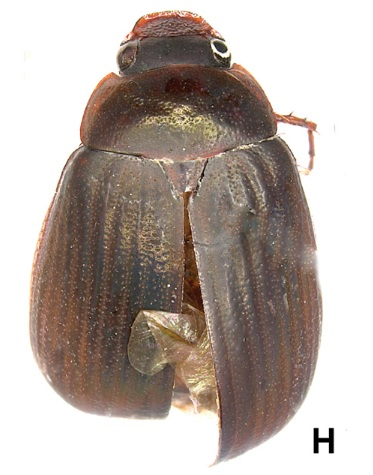

Scientific classification
- Kingdom: Animalia
- Phylum: Arthropoda
- Clade: Pancrustacea
- Class: Insecta
- Order: Coleoptera
- Suborder: Polyphaga
- Infraorder: Scarabaeiformia
- Family: Scarabaeidae
- Genus: Tetraserica
- Species: T. liangheensis

Binomial name
- Tetraserica liangheensis Liu, Fabrizi, Bai, Yang & Ahrens, 2014

= Tetraserica liangheensis =

Species of beetle

Tetraserica liangheensis is a species of beetle of the family Scarabaeidae. It is found in China (Yunnan), Laos and Thailand.

== Description ==
Adults reach a length of about 9.7 mm. The surface of the labroclypeus and the disc of the frons are glabrous. The smooth area anterior to the eye is twice as wide as long.

== Etymology ==
The species name is named after its type locality, Lianghe.
