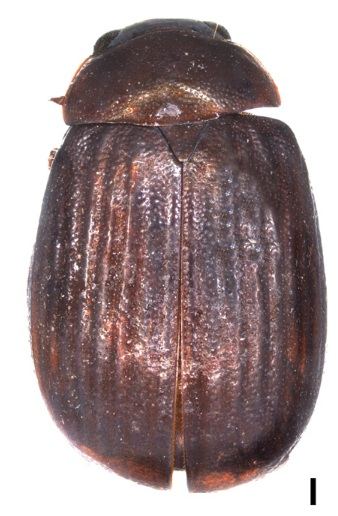

Scientific classification
- Kingdom: Animalia
- Phylum: Arthropoda
- Clade: Pancrustacea
- Class: Insecta
- Order: Coleoptera
- Suborder: Polyphaga
- Infraorder: Scarabaeiformia
- Family: Scarabaeidae
- Genus: Tetraserica
- Species: T. allochangshouensis

Binomial name
- Tetraserica allochangshouensis Fabrizi, Dalstein & Ahrens, 2019

= Tetraserica allochangshouensis =

Species of beetle

Tetraserica allochangshouensis is a species of beetle of the family Scarabaeidae. It is found in Vietnam.

== Description ==
Adults reach a length of about 8.2–8.8 mm. The surface of the labroclypeus and the disc of the frons are glabrous. The smooth area anterior to the eye is twice as wide as long.

== Etymology ==
The species name is derived from Greek allo- (meaning other) and the species name changshouensis and refers to its similarity to Tetraserica changshouensis.
