= Glossary of scientific naming =

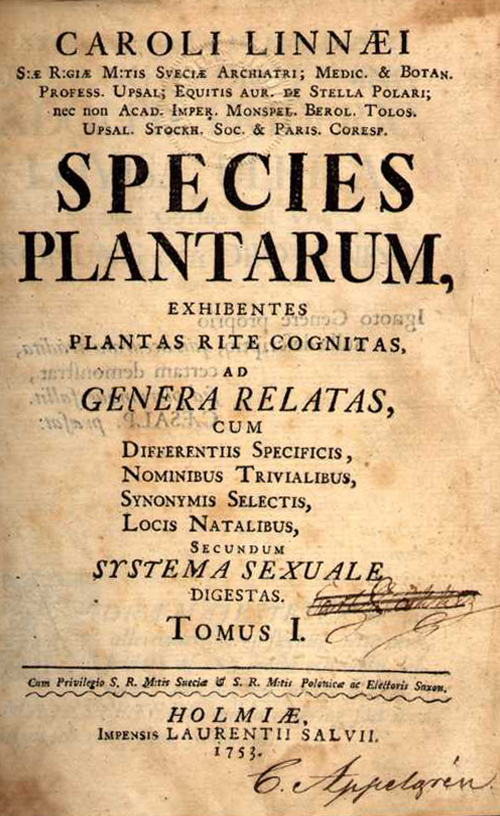
Linnaeus' Species Plantarum (1753)

This is a list of terms and symbols used in scientific names for organisms, and in describing the names. For proper parts of the names themselves, see List of Latin and Greek words commonly used in systematic names. Many of the abbreviations are used with or without a stop.

== Naming standards and taxonomic organizations and their codes and taxonomies ==
- ICTV – International Committee on Taxonomy of Viruses
- ICSP – International Committee on Systematics of Prokaryotes
  - formerly the ICSB – International Committee on Systematic Bacteriology
  - publishes the ICNP – International Code of Nomenclature of Prokaryotes
    - formerly the International Code of Nomenclature of Bacteria (ICNB) or Bacteriological Code (BC)
- ICZN – International Commission on Zoological Nomenclature
  - publishes ICZN – the International Code of Zoological Nomenclature or "ICZN Code"
- IBC – International Botanical Congress
  - publishes ICN – the International Code of Nomenclature for algae, fungi, and plants
    - formerly ICBN or the International Code of Botanical Nomenclature (current version: the Shenzhen Code)
    - Chapter F of this Code covers sections pertaining only to Fungi and can be further revised by the Fungal Nomenclature Session of an International Mycological Congress (IMC). Chapter F was revised as a result of decisions approved on 21 July 2018 by the closing plenary session of the 11th IMC, held in San Juan, Puerto Rico. The resulting San Juan Chapter F was published in the journal IMA Fungus on 27 December 2019 as an open-access article. The San Juan Chapter F supersedes Chapter F of the Shenzhen Code.
  - also publishes ICNCP or the International Code of Nomenclature for Cultivated Plants
- IAPT – International Association for Plant Taxonomy
  - publishes Taxon
  - also publishes Regnum Vegetabile which contains the IBC's ICN, the Index Nominum Genericorum, and the Index Herbariorum

== General terms ==
- clade, cladistics
- phylum, phylogeny
- taxon, taxonomy; Taxon is a journal of the IAPT, where proposals are made
- synonym: a name for a taxon different from the currently accepted name
  - pro parte (abbreviation p.p.; "for part" in Latin)
  - senior synonym, (zoology): the earliest (correctly published) name
  - junior synonym, (zoology): any later name
  - homotypic synonym (botany)
  - heterotypic synonym (botany) (or "taxonomic synonym"): a synonym that comes into being when a taxon is reduced in status ("reduced to synonymy") and becomes part of a different taxon; the zoological equivalent is "subjective synonym"
  - objective synonym (zoology)
  - subjective synonym (zoology): see heterotypic synonym
  - taxonomic synonym (botany): see heterotypic synonym
- basionym or basyonym (botany), or protonym or original combination (zoology): original name on which the current name is based; in bacteriology "basonym"
- combinatio nova (comb. nov.): new combination; when a taxon has been given a new name, preserving one of the previous components
- status novus (abbr. stat. nov.): new status; when a taxon has been given a new rank
- homonym: names spelled identically, but, in some codes, names spelled similarly, as defined by the code
  - senior homonym (zoology): the first legitimate use of the name which generally takes priority
  - junior homonym (zoology), later homonym (botany): a later and generally illegitimate use, though in some circumstances the later name is allowed to stand
  - hemihomonym: a homonym across naming authorities that is permitted because any confusion is improbable
  - parahomonym: names that are similar enough to be likely to be confused
- isonym (botany) an identical name based on the same type, but published later
- tautonym, a repeated name, for example Bubo bubo, Lutra lutra. Permitted in zoology, but not in botany.
- principle of the first reviser
- principle of priority
- principle of typification
- taxonomic authority
- binomial authority
- binomial nomenclature (also "binominal")
- trinomial nomenclature (also "trinominal")
- hybrid name (botany): either two parent binomials, separated by a "×" (q.v.) or a given binomial, with or without an intercalated "×"
- chresonym published usage of a name
  - heterochresonym
  - orthochresonym
- taxon (plural "taxa")
  - wastebasket taxon (also "wastebin taxon", "dustbin taxon" or "catch-all taxon")
  - Elvis taxon
  - form taxon
  - ichnotaxon (ichnogenus (igen.), ichnospecies (isp.), etc.): a taxon (genus, species, etc.) only known by its work, e.g. footprints, nests, or bite marks
  - Lazarus taxon
  - node-based taxon
  - ootaxon (oospecies, etc.): a taxon known from fossil eggs
  - parataxon
  - sciotaxon: a taxon known from partial evidence but believed to be identical to an orthotaxon
  - sister taxon
  - zombie taxon
- polyphyletic taxon
- monophyletic taxon: a taxon consisting of a common ancestor and all its lineal descendants; a clade
- paraphyletic taxon
- species complex: a group of closely related species very similar in appearance, generally constituting a monophyletic taxon
- species aggregate or aggregate species: a grouping of closely related species that are treated like a single species for practical purposes
- alliance: a group of species or genera that have at some time been considered provisionally related
- conspecific: of the same species; e. g. of two taxa previously thought to be different species
- congeners: items of the same genus
- circumscription: the limits of a taxon as made evident by its recognized constituency; a taxon may accordingly be circumscribed differently by different authorities if they recognize different constituents
- sensu ("sense" in Latin): as in sensu stricto (s. s.) (in the strict sense), sensu lato (in a broad sense), etc.; see sensu for more variants and details
- secundum ("following" in Latin): e. g. "secundum Smith"
- form classification

== Types ==
- Type
- Type genus
- Type series
- Type species
- Type specimen
  - Allotype: a designated type of opposite sex to the holotype
  - Clonotype
  - Epitype: an additional or clarifying type
  - Ergatotype
  - Hapantotype
  - Holotype
  - Iconotype: a type that is a picture
  - Isotype: a type identical to the holotype
  - Isolectotype:
  - Lectotype a type specimen selected from a group of syntypes
  - Name-bearing type
  - Neotype: a replacement for the holotype
  - Paralectotype: a remaining syntype once the lectotype and any isolectotypes are excluded (botany)
  - Paratype: a member of a type series apart from the holotype or isotype (zoology); a syntype that is not a member of the type series (botany)
  - Syntype: a specimen cited in the original description of the taxon (botany)
- Type locality or location: where the type specimen was found
- Type host: in parasitology, the host species from which the type specimen was recovered

== Rank names ==
The main ranks are kingdom (regnum), phylum or division (divisio), class (classis), order (ordo), family (familia), genus and species. The ranks of section and series are also used in botany for groups within genera, while section is used in zoology for a division of an order. Further levels in the hierarchy can be made by the addition of prefixes such as sub-, super-, infra-, and so on.

Divisions such as "morph", "form", "variety", "strain", "breed", "cultivar", hybrid (nothospecies) and "landrace" are used to describe various sub-specific groups in different fields.

It is possible for a clade to be unranked, for example Psoroptidia (Yunker, 1955) and the SAR supergroup. Sometimes a rank is described as clade where the traditional hierarchy cannot accommodate it.

== Latin descriptions of names or taxa ==
In zoology the English descriptions, such as "conserved name", for example, are acceptable and generally used. These descriptions can be classified between accepted names (nom. cons., nom. nov., nom. prot.) and unaccepted combinations for different reasons (nom. err., nom. illeg., nom. nud., nom. rej., nom. supp., nom. van.), with some cases in between regarding the use (nom. dub.: used but not fully accepted; nom. obl.: accepted but not fully used, so it yields precedence to a nom. prot). Note that not all of the following terms are recognized under all of the different Nomenclatural Codes.

- Candidatus (Ca.) – a taxon proposed from incomplete information, such as uncultured bacteria known from metagenomics
- ex errore – made in error
- incertae sedis – of uncertain taxonomic placement
- lapsus calami - an error made by an author when writing text, esp. misspelling of a name (contrasted with a printer's error)
- nomen alternativum (nom. alt.; plural: nomina alternativa) – an alternative name, as for certain plant families
- nomen confusum (nom. conf.), a name that is confused due to its description making it difficult to select a type to base the concept upon. It is no longer used in the botanical code and is found less often as such names are rejected.
- nomen conservandum (nom. cons.; plural: nomina conservanda) – a conserved name
- nomen dubium (nom. dub.; plural: nomina dubia) (zoo. bact. bot.(informal)) – a name of questionable application
  - nomen ambiguum (plural: nomina ambigua), (bot.) a name that has been used with more than one meaning
  - nomen confusum (plural: nomina confusa), (bact.) a name based on a mixed bacterial culture
  - nomen perplexum (plural: nomina perplexa), a name confusingly similar to another name or names
  - nomen periculosum (plural: nomina periculosa), a name which can lead to dangerous outcomes, through confusion
- nomen erratum (nom. err.; plural: nomina errata) – a name given in error
- nomen illegitimum (nom. illeg.; plural: nomina illegitima) – an illegitimate name
- nomen invalidum (nom. inval.; plural: nomina invalida) – an invalid name
- nomen manuscriptum – a name that appears in a manuscript
- nomen monstrositatum (nom. monstr.) – a name based on a monstrosity (fasciation, phyllody or similar deformities)
- nomen novum (nom. nov.; plural: nomina nova) – a replacement name
- nomen nudum (nom. nud.; plural: nomina nuda) – a name published without an accompanying description
- nomen oblitum (nom. obl.; plural: nomina oblita) – a name which has been overlooked (literally, forgotten) and is no longer valid
- nomen protectum (nom. prot.; plural: nomina protecta) – a name granted protection
- nomen rejiciendum (nom. rej.; plural: nomina rejicienda) – a name that has been rejected and cannot be used
- nomen subnudum (nom. subnud.; plural nomina subnuda) – A species that was published with a description, but not detailed enough to describe it. Similar to nomen nudum.
- nomen superfluum (nom. superfl.; plural: nomina superflua ) - "superfluous name"
- nomen suppressum (nom. supp.; plural: nomina suppressa) – a name that has been suppressed and cannot be used
- nomen vanum (plural: nomina vana) – not a useful term, has been used to mean either a nomen dubium (see above in this list), or an invalid change in spelling, better called an unjustified emendation
- nomina circumscribentia, a name derived from its circumscription
- partim, indicates that a taxon was split and contains only a part of the original entity.
- sphalmate (sphalm.), erroneously, by mistake
- species inquirenda, a species of doubtful identity requiring further investigation

== Latin abbreviations ==
=== Common Latin abbreviations ===
- cf.: confer; literally 'compare', indicates approximate placement
- f.: forma; 'form' (f.d.: forma domestica)
- nothovar.: nothovarietas; 'bastard variety'; a hybrid variety
- nob.: nobis: 'by us'; indicates the writers are/writer is the authority of a scientific name
- p.p.: pro parte; 'for part'
- pro syn.: pro synonymo; 'as synonym'
- sensu auct.: sensu auctorum; 'in the sense of the [original] author[s]'; generally referring to an invalid usage
- s.l.: sensu lato; 'in the broad/loose sense'
- sp. (plural spp.): species (identical in English)
- sp. nov. (plural spp. nov.): species nova (pl. species novae): 'new species'
- s.s.: sensu stricto; 'in the strict/narrow/precise sense'
- ssp. (plural sspp.): subspecies (identical in English)
- subf.: subforma; 'subform'
- subsp. (plural subspp.): subspecies (identical in English)
- subvar.: subvarietas; 'subvariety'
- var.: varietas; 'variety'

=== Latin abbreviations relating to novelty ===
These abbreviations indicate taxonomic novelty—newly identified or newly classified taxa.

- comb. nov.: combinatio nova: 'new combination' – used when a species is moved to a different genus
- gen. et sp. nov.: genus et species nova: a new genus and a new species described simultaneously (typically for a monotypic genus)
- gen. et comb. nov.: genus et combinatio nova: a new genus and a new combination, often when a species is transferred into a newly erected genus
- gen., sp. et comb. nov.: genus, species et combinatio nova: indicates that a genus is newly described, a species is newly described, and an existing name is reassigned (rare and complex case; usage should be clarified in text)
- gen. nov. (plural genera nova): genus novum (pl. genera nova): 'new genus'
- gen. nov. et 2 [3, 4, etc.] spp. nov.: informal shorthand meaning a new genus and two (three, four, etc.) new species; not standard Latin, but occasionally seen in summaries or abstracts
- nom. nov.: nomen novum: 'new name' – used to replace a preoccupied or otherwise invalid name
- sp. nov. (plural spp. nov.): species nova (pl. species novae): 'new species'
- subsp. nov.: subspecies nova: 'new subspecies'

== English abbreviations ==
- bot. - botany
- zoo. - zoology

== Symbols ==
- × : cross; indicates a hybrid
- † : extinct
- + : graft or chimera; indicates a graft chimera
- - : invalid name
- = : heterotypic synonym
- ≡ : homotypic synonym

== See also ==
- Alpha taxonomy
- Cladistics
- Glossary of botanical terms
- Species description
