= Maladera utacamanda =

Scientific classification
- Kingdom: Animalia
- Phylum: Arthropoda
- Class: Insecta
- Order: Coleoptera
- Suborder: Polyphaga
- Infraorder: Scarabaeiformia
- Family: Scarabaeidae
- Genus: Maladera
- Species: M. utacamanda

Binomial name
- Maladera utacamanda (Brenske, 1899)

Synonyms
- Autoserica utacamanda Brenske, 1899

Species of beetle

Maladera utacamanda is a species of beetle of the family Scarabaeidae. It is found in India (Tamil Nadu).

== Taxonomy ==
The identity of the species and its systematic placement are uncertain. Due to a lack of male specimens, the interpretation of the status of this species is difficult. The syntype is slightly larger than the specimens of Maladera madurensis and Maladera calicutensis, but the punctuation and shape of the labroclypeus is very similar to both taxa.
