= Maladera manipurana =

Scientific classification
- Kingdom: Animalia
- Phylum: Arthropoda
- Class: Insecta
- Order: Coleoptera
- Suborder: Polyphaga
- Infraorder: Scarabaeiformia
- Family: Scarabaeidae
- Genus: Maladera
- Species: M. manipurana

Binomial name
- Maladera manipurana (Brenske, 1899)

Synonyms
- Autoserica manipurana Brenske, 1899

Species of beetle

Maladera manipurana is a species of beetle of the family Scarabaeidae. It is found in India (Manipur).

== Taxonomy ==
The identity of the species and its systematic placement are uncertain. Due to a lack of male specimens, the interpretation of the status of this species is difficult. Syntypes are quite similar to Maladera drescheri.
