= Nomen dubium =

Doubtful name in taxonomy

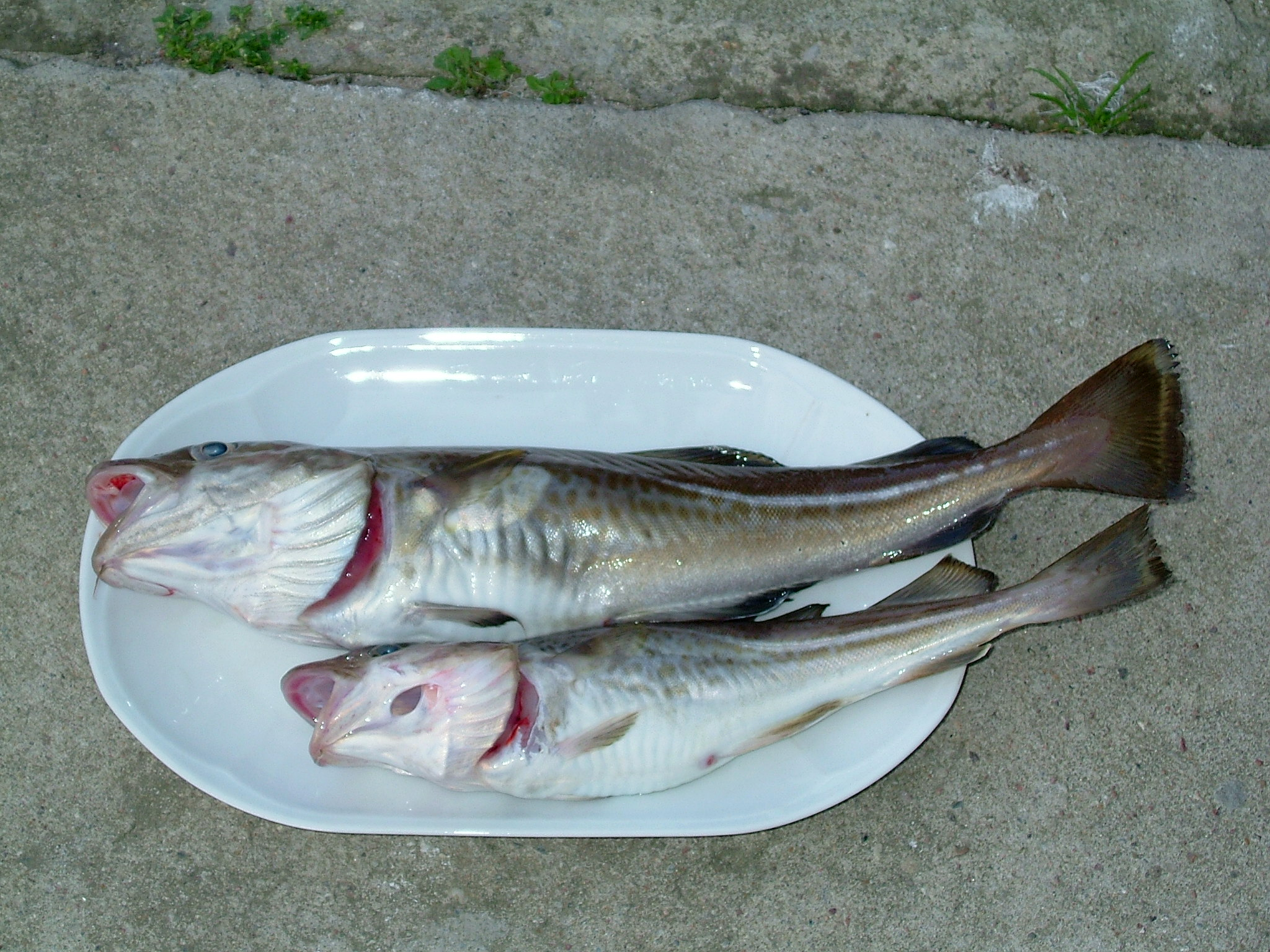
Gadus callarias, an example of nomen dubium, now considered a potential synonym or a subspecies of G. morhua

In binomial nomenclature, a nomen dubium (Latin for "doubtful name", plural nomina dubia) is a scientific name that is of unknown or doubtful application.

== Zoology ==
In case of a nomen dubium, it may be impossible to determine whether a specimen belongs to that group or not. This may happen if the original type series (i.e. holotype, isotype, syntype or paratype) is lost or destroyed. The zoological and botanical codes allow for a new type specimen, or neotype, to be chosen in this case.

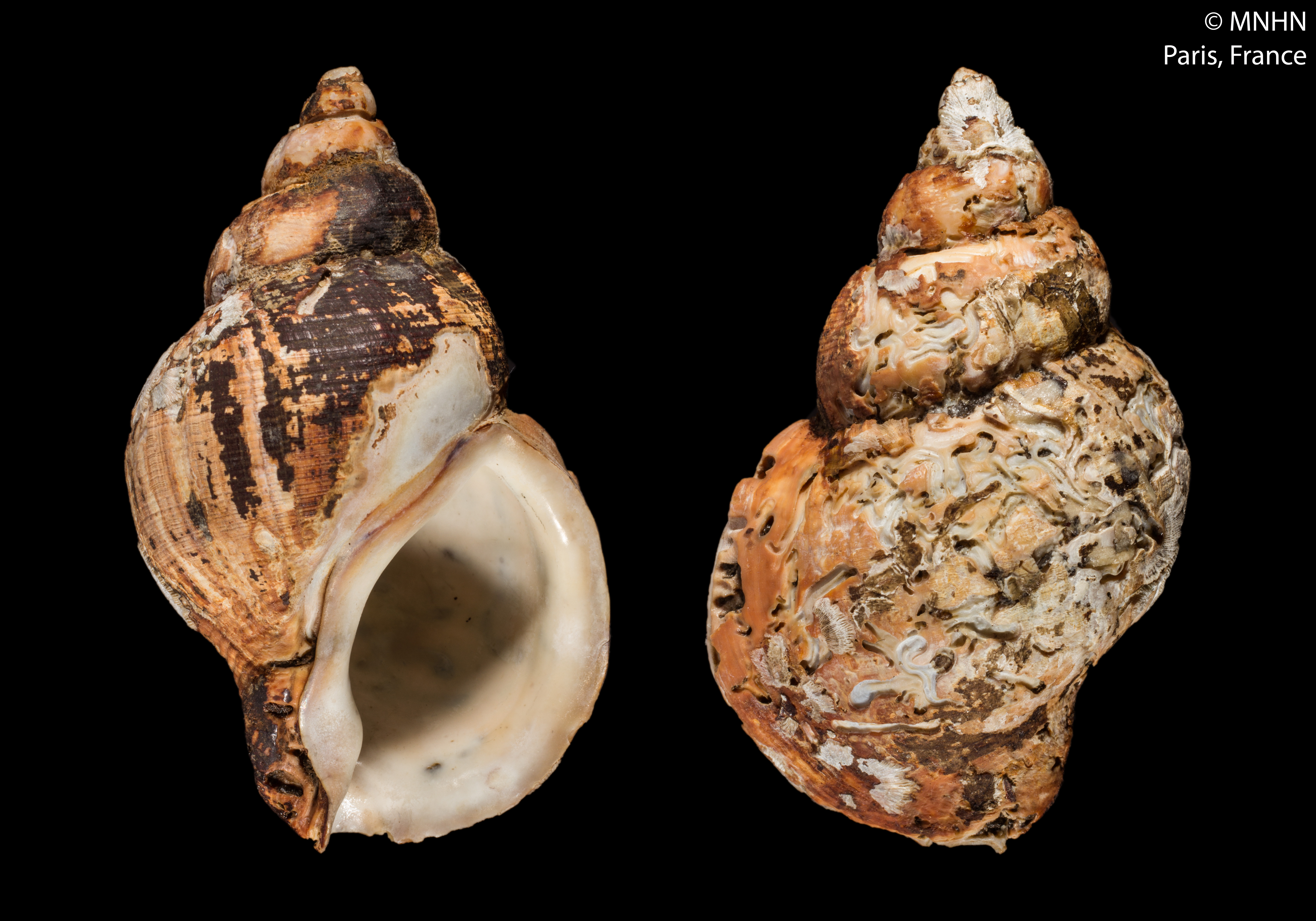
Preserved specimen of Tritonellium barthi Valenciennes, 1858 (nomen dubium)

A name may also be considered a nomen dubium if its name-bearing type is fragmentary or lacking important diagnostic features (this is often the case for species known only as fossils). To preserve stability of names, the International Code of Zoological Nomenclature allows a new type specimen, or neotype, to be chosen for a nomen dubium in this case.

75.5. Replacement of unidentifiable name-bearing type by a neotype. When an author considers that the taxonomic identity of a nominal species-group taxon cannot be determined from its existing name-bearing type (i.e. its name is a nomen dubium), and stability or universality are threatened thereby, the author may request the Commission to set aside under its plenary power [Art. 81] the existing name-bearing type and designate a neotype.

For example, the crocodile-like archosaurian reptile Parasuchus hislopi Lydekker, 1885 was described based on a premaxillary rostrum (part of the snout), but this is no longer sufficient to distinguish Parasuchus from its close relatives. This made the name Parasuchus hislopi a nomen dubium. In 2001 a paleontologist proposed that a new type specimen, a complete skeleton, be designated. The International Commission on Zoological Nomenclature considered the case and agreed in 2003 to replace the original type specimen with the proposed neotype.

== Bacteriology ==
In bacteriological nomenclature, nomina dubia may be placed on the list of rejected names by the Judicial Commission. The meaning of these names is uncertain. Other categories of names that may be treated in this way (rule 56a) are:

- ambiguous names, nomina ambigua, have been used with more than one meaning
- names causing confusion, nomina confusa, are based on a mixed culture
- perplexing names, nomina perplexa, confusingly similar names
- perilous names, nomina periculosa, names that may lead to accidents endangering life or health or with potential serious economic consequences

== Botany ==
In botanical nomenclature the phrase nomen dubium has no status, although it is informally used for names whose application has become confusing. In this regard, its synonym nomen ambiguum is of more frequent use. Such names may be proposed for rejection.

== See also ==
- Glossary of scientific naming
- Species inquirenda, a species of doubtful identity requiring further investigation
- Nomen nudum, a name proposed with no description (or illustration)
- Nomen oblitum, an obsolete name
