= Wastebasket taxon =

Classification of organisms that do not fit in other classifications

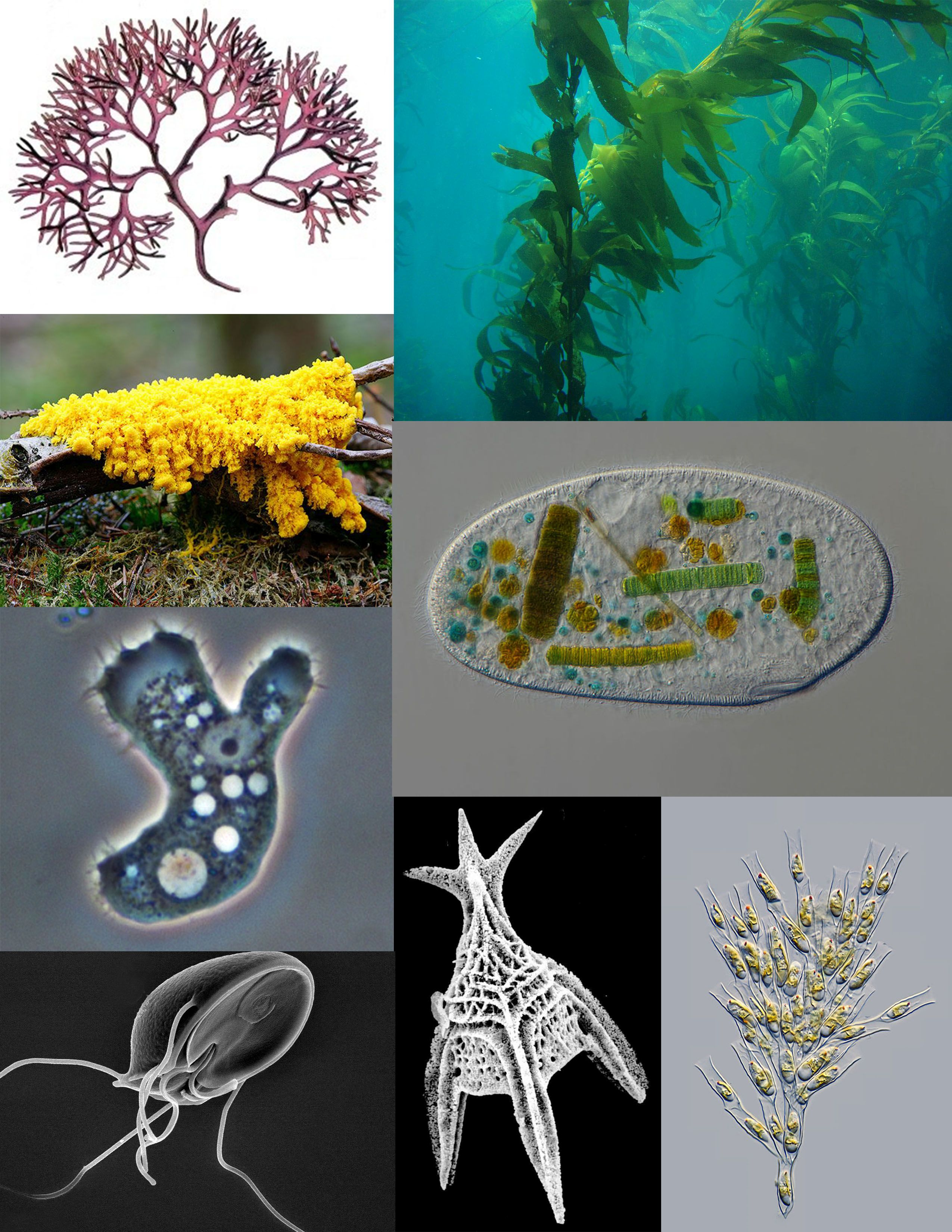
Collage of Protista, one of the best-known [obsolete] wastebasket taxa. The vast majority of its members have little in common apart from being eukaryote lifeforms that are not plants, animals, or fungi.

Wastebasket taxon (also called a waste-bin taxon, dustbin taxon or catch-all taxon) is a term used by some taxonomists to refer to a taxon that has the purpose of classifying organisms that do not fit anywhere else. They are typically defined by either their designated members' often-superficial similarity to each other, or their lack of one or more distinct character states or by their not belonging to one or more other taxa. Wastebasket taxa are by definition either paraphyletic or polyphyletic, and are therefore not considered valid taxa under strict cladistic rules of taxonomy. The name of a wastebasket taxon may in some cases be retained as the designation of an evolutionary grade, however.

== Examples ==
There are many examples of paraphyletic groups, but true "wastebasket" taxa are those that are known not to, and perhaps not intended to, represent natural groups, but are nevertheless used as convenient groups of organisms. The [obsolete] kingdom Protista (see below) is perhaps the most famous example. Wastebasket taxa are often old (and perhaps not described with the systematic rigour and precision that is possible in the light of accumulated knowledge of diversity) and populous.

- In 2022, the Pteromalidae (a Hymenoptera (wasp) family in the superfamily Chalcidoidea long considered polyphyletic) was split into 24 families.
- The Flacourtiaceae, a now-defunct family of flowering plants – the Angiosperm Phylogeny Group has placed its tribes and genera in various other families, especially the Achariaceae and Salicaceae.
- The obsolete kingdom Protista consisted of all eukaryotes that are not animals, plants, or fungi, leaving to the protists all single-celled eukaryotes.
- The Tricholomataceae is a fungal group, at one point composed of the white-, yellow-, or pink-spored genera in the Agaricales not already classified as belonging to the Amanitaceae, Lepiotaceae, Hygrophoraceae, Pluteaceae, or Entolomataceae.
- Carnosauria and Thecodontia are fossil groups, banded together back when the limited fossil record did not allow for a more detailed scheme.
- Condylarthra is an artificial clade into which ungulate mammals not clearly within Perissodactyla or Cetartiodactyla were traditionally shoved. Many of these groups, like Meridiungulata or Protungulatum, may not represent laurasitherian mammals, while others like phenacodontids have been clearly established as early odd-toed ungulates.
- The order Insectivora has traditionally been used as a dumping ground for placental insectivorous mammals (and similar forms such as colugos), usually aligned with carnivorans, ungulates, and bats. While the core components (moles, shrews, hedgehogs, and their close relations) do in fact form a consistent clade, Eulipotyphla, that is part of Laurasiatheria with the aforementioned clades, other mammals historically placed in the order have been found to belong to other branches of the placental tree: tree shrews and colugos are euarchontans related to Primates and sometimes grouped in Sundatheria, while tenrecs, golden moles, and elephant shrews are all afrotheres, probably forming the clade Afroinsectiphilia. Both of these clades have at times been accused of being wastebasket taxa themselves, grouping superficially similar animals in Euarchonta and Afrotheria, respectively, but they have been more strongly supported by genetic studies.
- Vermes is an obsolete taxon of worm-like animals. It was a catch-all term used by Carl Linnaeus and Jean-Baptiste Lamarck for non-arthropod invertebrate animals.
- The genus Mamenchisaurus is sometimes considered a wastebasket taxon for large, long-necked dinosaurs.

== Paleontology ==
Fossil groups that are poorly known due to fragmentary remains are sometimes grouped together on gross morphology or stratigraphy, only later to be found to be wastebasket taxa, such as the crocodile-like Triassic group Rauisuchia.

One of the roles of taxonomists is to identify wastebasket taxa and reclassify the content into more natural units. Sometimes, during taxonomic revisions, a wastebasket taxon can be salvaged after doing thorough research on its members, and then imposing tighter restrictions on what continues to be included. Such techniques "saved" Carnosauria and Megalosaurus. Other times, the taxonomic name contains too much unrelated "baggage" to be successfully salvaged. As such, it is usually dumped in favour of a new, more restrictive name (for example, Rhynchocephalia), or abandoned altogether (for example, Simia).

== Related concepts ==
A related concept is that of form taxon, "wastebasket" groupings that are united by gross morphology. This is often result of a common mode of life, often one that is generalist, leading to generally similar body shapes by convergent evolution.

The term wastebasket taxon is sometimes employed in a derogatory fashion to refer to an evolutionary grade taxon.

== See also ==
- Lazarus taxon
- Elvis taxon
- Incertae sedis
- Glossary of scientific naming
- Not Otherwise Specified
