= Genetypes =

Concept in genetic science

Genetypes is a taxonomic concept proposed in 2010 to describe any genetic sequences from type specimens. This nomenclature integrates molecular systematics and terms used in biological taxonomy. This nomenclature is designed to label, or flag, genetic sequences that were sampled from type specimens. The nomenclature of genetypes proposes that genetic sequences from a holotype should be referred to as a “hologenetype” (from “holotype” and “genetype”), sequences from a topotype should be a “topogenetype”, and so forth. In addition, the genetic marker(s) used should be incorporated into the nomenclature (e.g. paragenetype ND2).

The genetypes nomenclatural system could be used to flag “gold standard” sequences that due to their direct link to type specimens will be more credible than standard sequences whose species identification may be problematic. Misidentifications plague many sequences on GenBank and having some sequences that are linked to type specimens will help locate and manage misidentifications and to create positively identified "gold standard" sequences available for comparison. It is suggested that this nomenclature be used in publications and databases that display or discuss sequences from type specimens.

Examples of genetypes include:

- Leptoderma macrophthalmum hologenetype mitogenome - AP011500
- Milyeringa brooksi paragenetype COI - HM590595
- Milyeringa brooksi paragenetype NDI - HM590607

The genetypes concept was superseded by the GenSeq concept, proposed in 2013 due to some confusion among researchers that genetypes were equivalent to name-bearing types.

== See also ==
- DNA barcoding
- Type species
- Holotype
