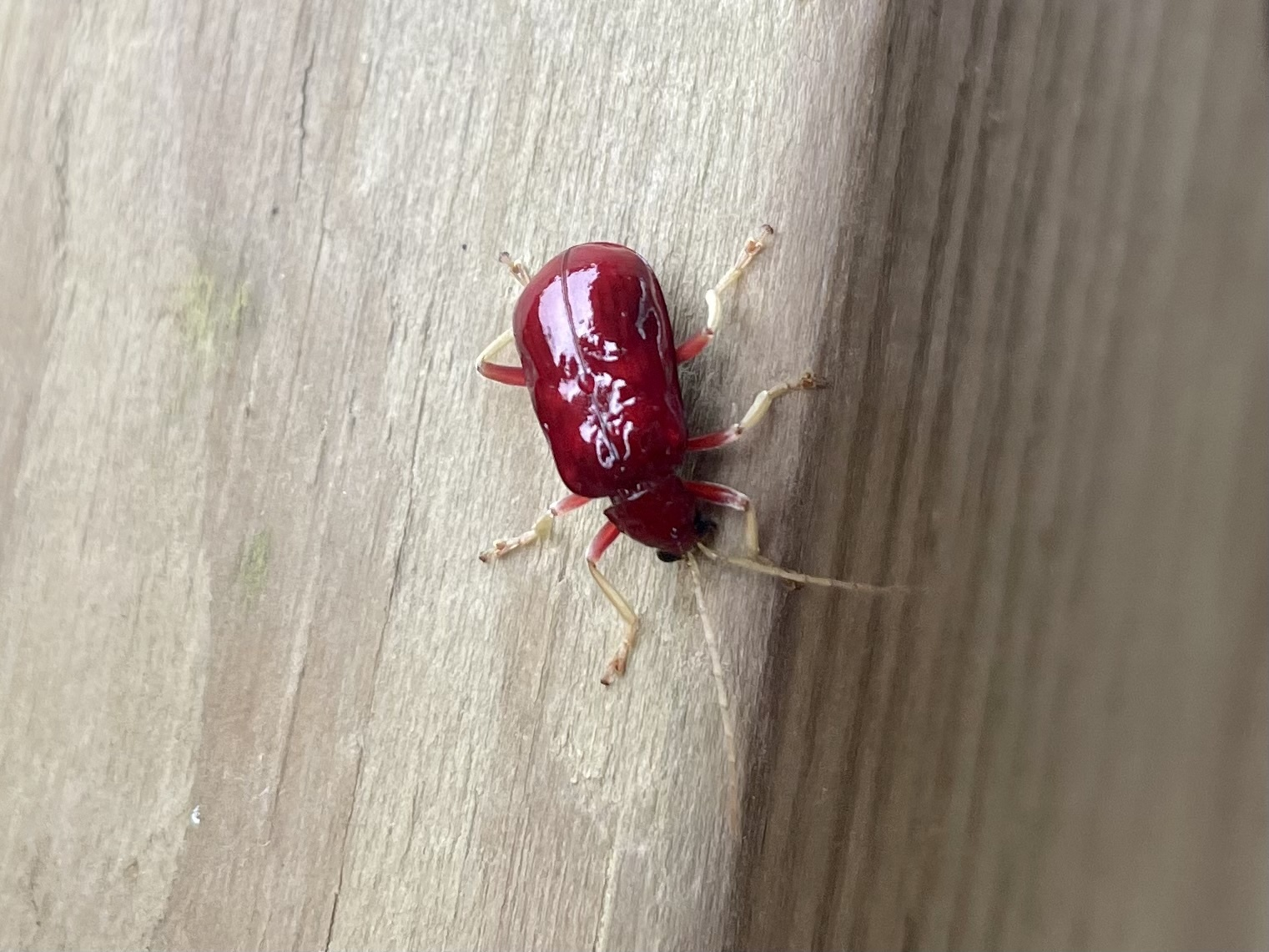

Scientific classification
- Kingdom: Animalia
- Phylum: Arthropoda
- Clade: Pancrustacea
- Class: Insecta
- Order: Coleoptera
- Suborder: Polyphaga
- Infraorder: Cucujiformia
- Family: Chrysomelidae
- Genus: Paratriarius
- Species: P. coccineus

Binomial name
- Paratriarius coccineus (Baly, 1865)

= Paratriarius coccineus =

Species of beetle

Paratriarius coccineus is a species of skeletonizing leaf beetle in the family Chrysomelidae. It was first described as Diabrotica coccinea by Joseph Sugar Baly in 1865. It was later treated as a Synbrotica species by Bechyné in 1956, and subsequently listed under genus Paratriarius in the last world catalogue of Galerucinae. A syntype of the species is held in the collections of the Natural History Museum in London.
