= Type species =

Term used in biological nomenclature

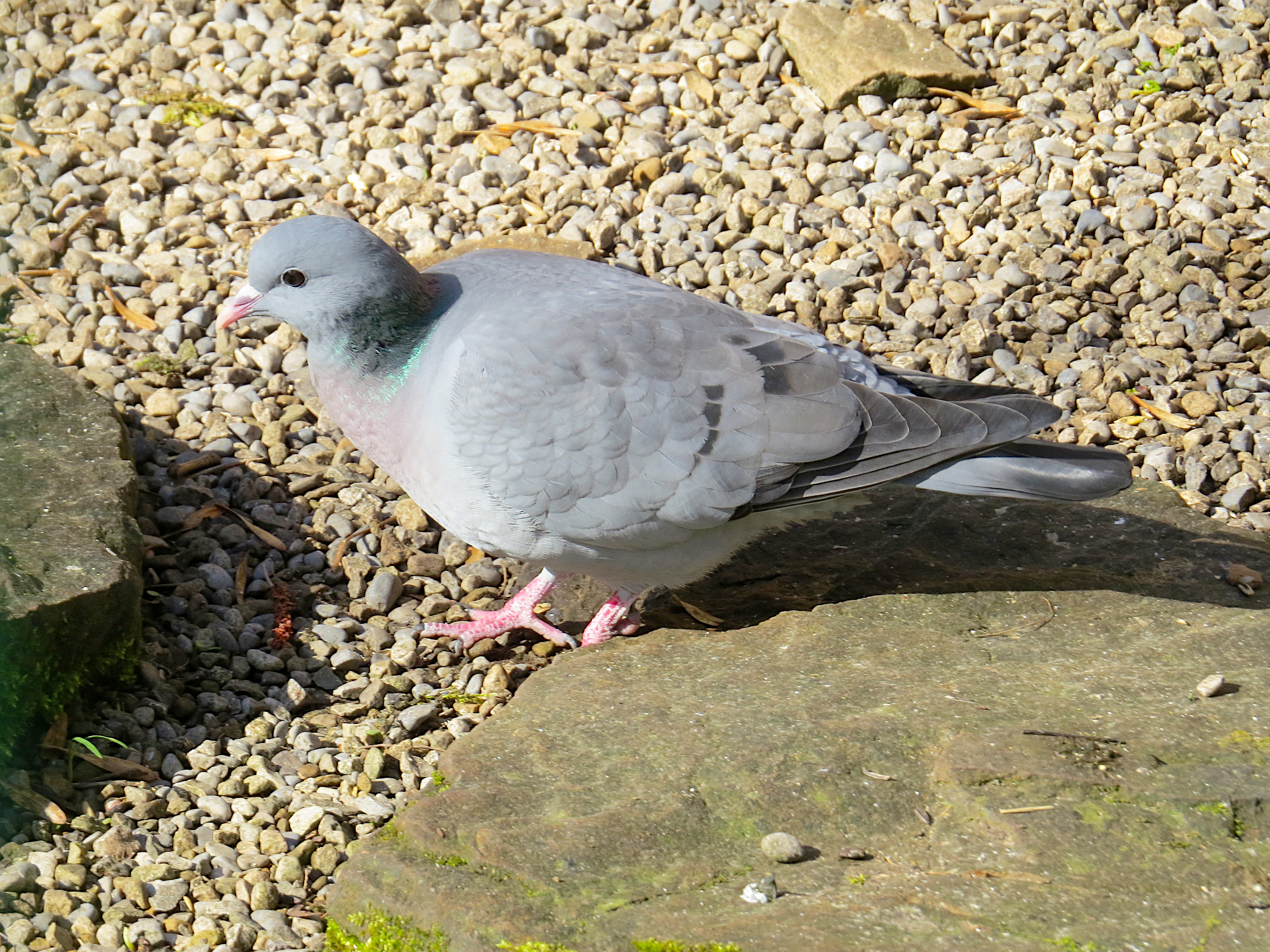
Columba oenas, the stock dove, is the type species of the genus Columba.

A type species (species typica) is the species considered to be permanently taxonomically associated with the name of a genus or subgenus, and that is used to identify it and distinguish it from others. In modern times, it is normally assigned when the genus or subgenus is first named. Any taxonomic revisions must be done in such a way that the genus or subgenus retains the type species if the genus is to keep its name.

== Principles ==
The type species acts as a fixed reference point for its genus and will not usually be changed. It serves to anchor the name of the genus such that it stays linked to the same species. This system provides consistency and stability to the group's identity in the face of future taxonomic revisions. In exceptional circumstances, taxonomists may choose to conserve the name of a genus or other taxon, which will change that group's type species to one that better fits the taxon concept. The type species does not need to represent the most characteristic or average member of the group, as long as it allows its genus to be distinguished from the others. A similar concept is used for other taxonomic ranks: the type specimen is the sole representative of a species, while the type genus represents a family.

== In zoology ==
A type species is both a concept and a practical system that is used in the classification and nomenclature (naming) of animals. The "type species" represents the reference species and thus "definition" for a particular genus name. Whenever a taxon containing multiple species must be divided into more than one genus, the type species automatically assigns the name of the original taxon to one of the resulting new taxa, the one that includes the type species.

The term "type species" is regulated in zoological nomenclature by article 42.3 of the International Code of Zoological Nomenclature, which defines a type species as the name-bearing type of the name of a genus or subgenus (a "genus-group name"). In the Glossary, type species is defined as

The nominal species that is the name-bearing type of a nominal genus or subgenus.

The type species permanently attaches a formal name (the generic name) to a genus by providing just one species within that genus to which the genus name is permanently linked (i.e. the genus must include that species if it is to bear the name). The species name in turn is fixed, in theory, to a type specimen.

For example, the type species for the land snail genus Monacha is Helix cartusiana, the name under which the species was first described (the original combination), subsequently known as Monacha cartusiana when placed in the genus Monacha. That genus is currently placed within the family Hygromiidae. The type genus for that family is the genus Hygromia.

The original combination of a type species is known as a basionym.

The concept of the type species in zoology was introduced by Pierre André Latreille.

== Other disciplines ==
In botanical nomenclature, scientific names also must be associated with a type according to the International Code of Nomenclature for algae, fungi, and plants for the same referential purpose.

In bacteriology, a type species is assigned for each genus. Whether or not currently recognized as valid, every named genus or subgenus in zoology is theoretically associated with a type species. In practice, however, there is a backlog of untypified names defined in older publications, when it was not required to specify a type.

The rule of genus typification was also included in the nomenclature of viruses; since 2021 it is not applied.

== Citing ==
The International Code of Zoological Nomenclature states that the original name (binomen) of the type species should always be cited. It gives an example in Article 67.1. Astacus marinus Fabricius, 1775 was later designated as the type species of the genus Homarus, thus giving it the name Homarus marinus (Fabricius, 1775). However, the type species of Homarus should always be cited using its original name, i.e. Astacus marinus Fabricius, 1775, even though that is a junior synonym of Cancer gammarus Linnaeus, 1758.

Although the International Code of Nomenclature for algae, fungi, and plants does not contain the same explicit statement, examples make it clear that the original name is used, so that the "type species" of a genus name need not have a name within that genus. Thus in Article 10, Ex. 3, the type of the genus name Elodes is quoted as the type of the species name Hypericum aegypticum, not as the type of the species name Elodes aegyptica. (Elodes is not now considered distinct from Hypericum.)

== See also ==
- Glossary of scientific naming
- Genetypes – genetic sequence data from type specimens.
- Holotype
- Paratype
- Principle of typification
- Type (and type specimen)
- Type genus
