= Holotype =

Example of an organism used to describe its species

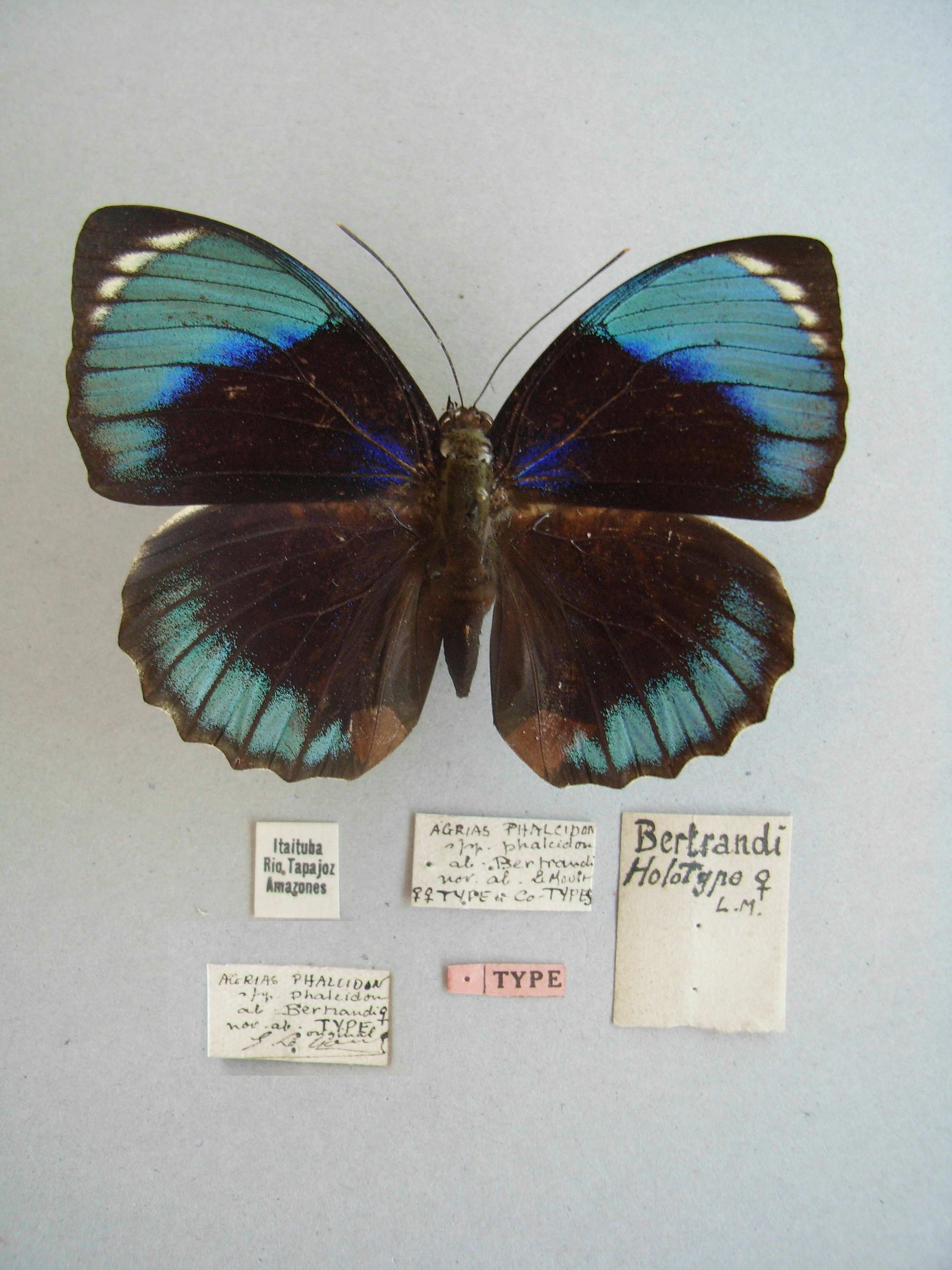
Holotype with red type label affixed

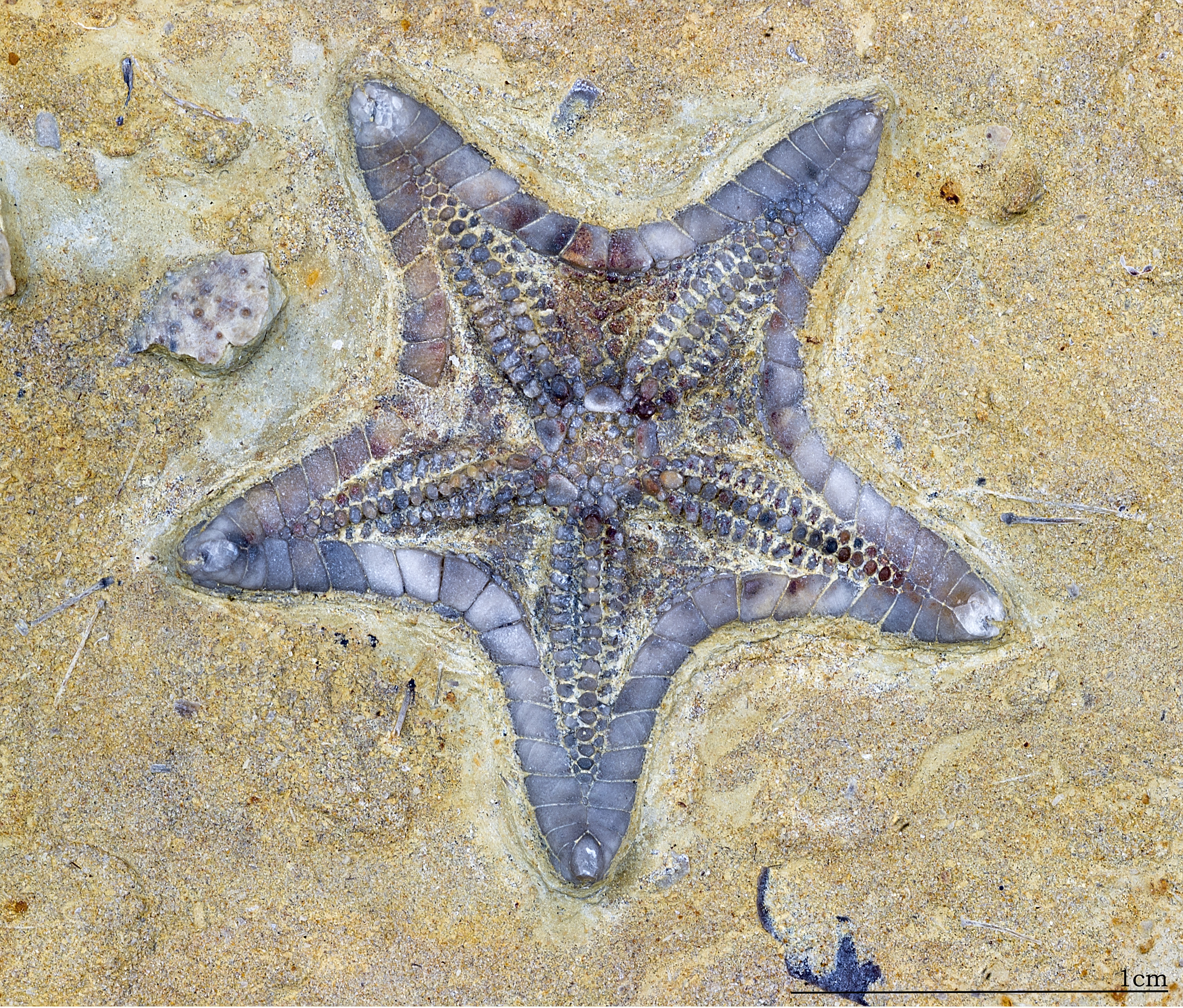
Holotype of Marocaster coronatus, MHNT

Live holotype of Eupolybothrus cavernicolus

Video of the capture of the holotype for the jellyfish species Santjordia pagesi, as recorded by a remotely operated underwater vehicle

A holotype is the single physical example (or illustration) of an organism that was used when the species (or lower-ranked taxon) was formally described. It may be the only such physical example (or illustration), or it may have been explicitly designated as the holotype from among several examples. Under the International Code of Zoological Nomenclature (ICZN), there are several kinds of name-bearing types, and a holotype is one of them.

In botany and mycology, an isotype is a duplicate of the holotype, generally pieces from the same individual plant or samples from the same genetic individual. Between the International Code of Nomenclature for algae, fungi, and plants (ICN) and the ICZN, the definitions of types are similar in intent but not identical in terminology or underlying concept. For example, the holotype for the butterfly Plebejus idas longinus is a preserved specimen of that subspecies, held by the Museum of Comparative Zoology at Harvard University.

A holotype is not necessarily "typical" of that taxon, although ideally it is. Sometimes just a fragment of an organism is the holotype, particularly in the case of a fossil. For example, the holotype of Pelorosaurus humerocristatus (Duriatitan), a large herbivorous dinosaur from the early Cretaceous, is a fossil leg bone stored at the Natural History Museum in London. Even if a better specimen is subsequently found, the holotype is not superseded.

== Replacements for lost or faulty holotypes ==
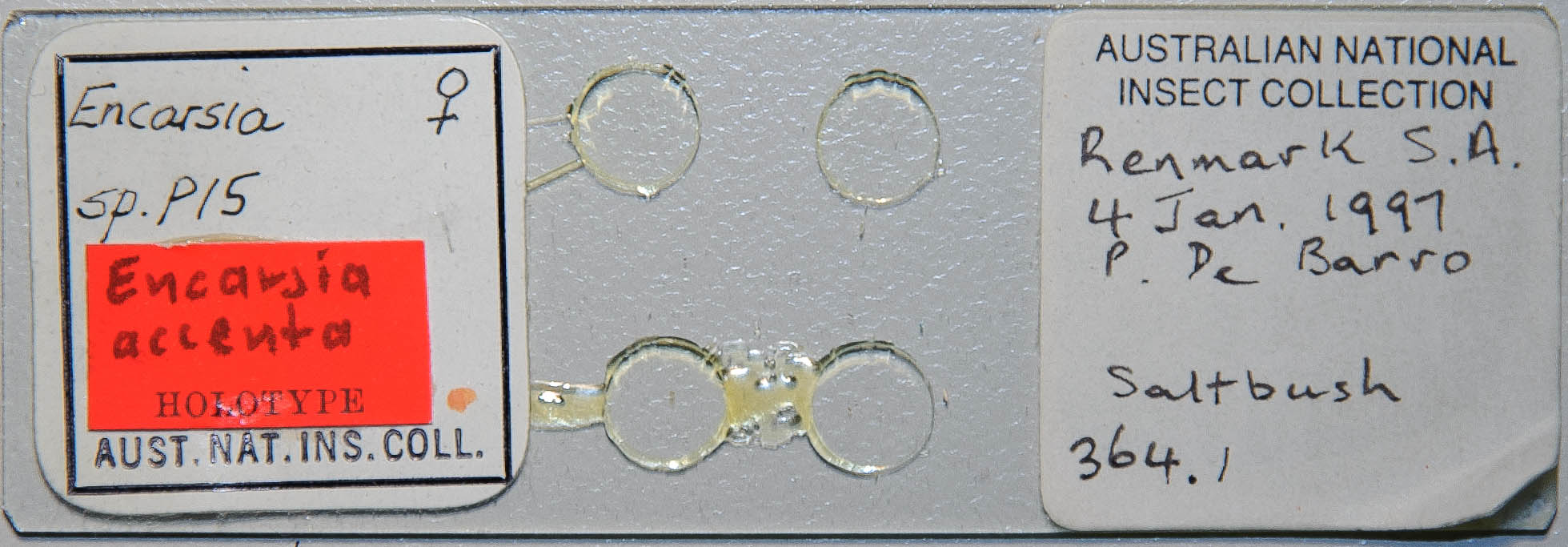
Modern holotype label for Encarsia accenta

Under the ICN, an additional and clarifying type could be designated an epitype under article 9.8, where the original material is demonstrably ambiguous or insufficient.

A conserved type (ICN article 14.3) is sometimes used to correct a problem with a name which has been misapplied; this specimen replaces the original holotype.

In the absence of a holotype, another type may be selected, out of a range of different kinds of type, depending on the case, a lectotype or a neotype.

For example, in both the ICN and the ICZN a neotype is a type that was later appointed in the absence of the original holotype. Additionally, under the ICZN the commission is empowered to replace a holotype with a neotype, when the holotype turns out to lack important diagnostic features needed to distinguish the species from its close relatives. For example, the crocodile-like archosaurian reptile Parasuchus hislopi Lydekker, 1885 was described based on a premaxillary rostrum (part of the snout), but this is no longer sufficient to distinguish Parasuchus from its close relatives. This made the name Parasuchus hislopi a nomen dubium. Indian-American paleontologist Sankar Chatterjee proposed that a new type specimen, a complete skeleton, be designated. The International Commission on Zoological Nomenclature considered the case and agreed to replace the original type specimen with the proposed neotype.

The procedures for the designation of a new type specimen when the original is lost come into play for some recent, high-profile species descriptions in which the specimen designated as the holotype was a living individual that was allowed to remain in the wild (e.g. a new species of capuchin monkey, genus Cebus, the bee fly species Marleyimyia xylocopae, or the Arunachal macaque Macaca munzala). In such a case, there is no actual type specimen available for study, and the possibility exists that—should there be any perceived ambiguity in the identity of the species—subsequent authors can invoke various clauses in the ICZN Code that allow for the designation of a neotype. Article 75.3.7 of the ICZN requires that the designation of a neotype must be accompanied by "a statement that the neotype is, or immediately upon publication has become, the property of a recognized scientific or educational institution, cited by name, that maintains a research collection, with proper facilities for preserving name-bearing types, and that makes them accessible for study", but there is no such requirement for a holotype.

== See also ==
- Allotype (zoology)
- Genetypes – Genetic sequence data from type specimens
- Paratype
- Principle of typification
- Syntype
- Type (biology)
- Type species
