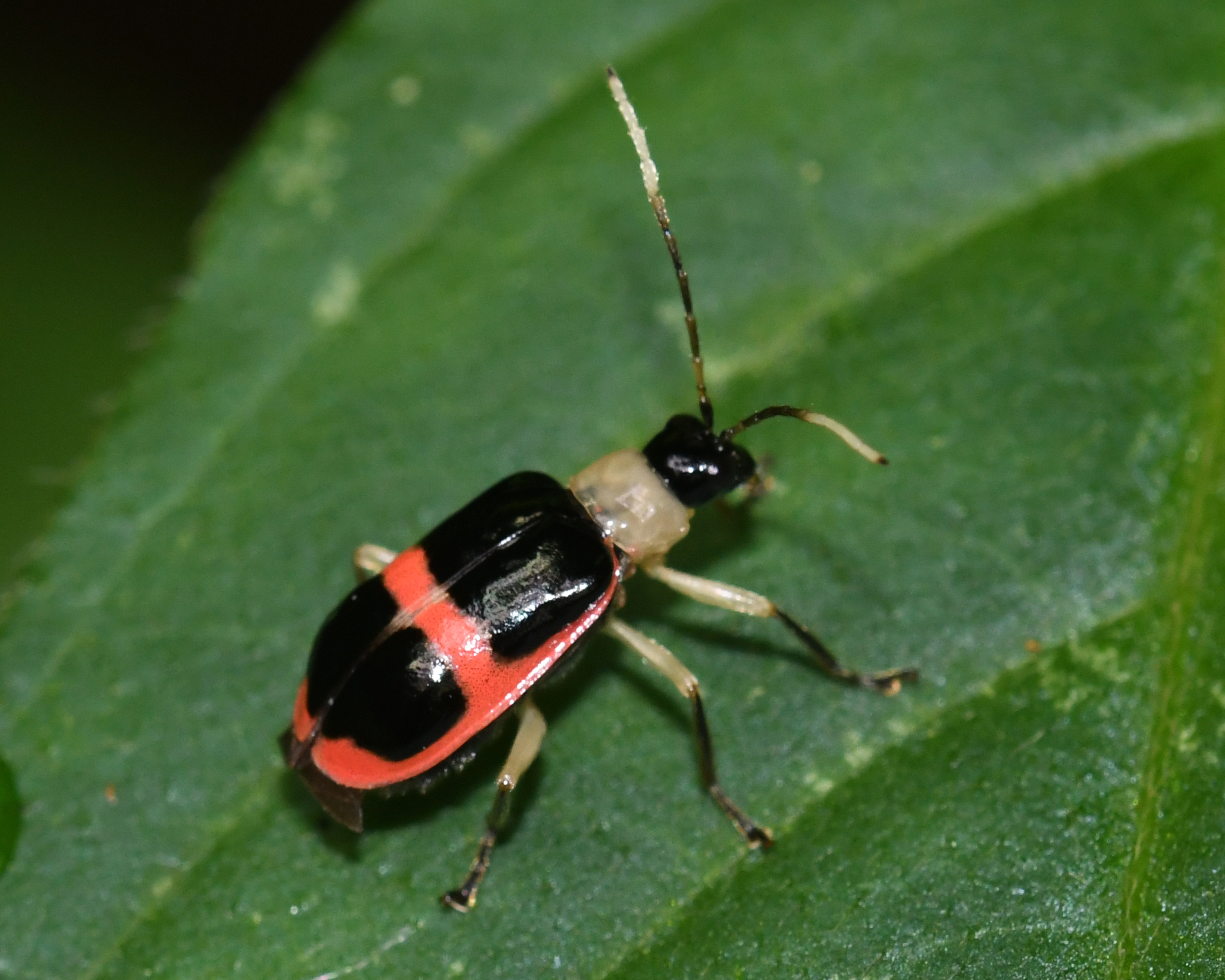
- Paratriarius adonis

Scientific classification
- Kingdom: Animalia
- Phylum: Arthropoda
- Clade: Pancrustacea
- Class: Insecta
- Order: Coleoptera
- Suborder: Polyphaga
- Infraorder: Cucujiformia
- Family: Chrysomelidae
- Subfamily: Galerucinae
- Tribe: Luperini
- Subtribe: Diabroticina
- Genus: Paratriarius; Schaeffer, 1906

Synonyms
- Chanchamayia Bechyné, 1956

= Paratriarius =

Genus of beetles

Paratriarius is a genus of skeletonizing leaf beetles in the family Chrysomelidae. There are more than 20 described species in Paratriarius. They are found in North America and the Neotropics.

== Species ==
There are 52 species recognised in the genus Paratriarius including:

- Paratriarius azureipennis Gahan, 1891
- Paratriarius bipartitus (Baly, 1889)
- Paratriarius coccineus (Baly, 1865)
- Paratriarius cognatus (Baly, 1889)
- Paratriarius coryphaea (Baly, 1886)
- Paratriarius cruciatus (Jacoby, 1887)
- Paratriarius curtisii (Baly, 1886)
- Paratriarius denotatus (Gahan, 1891)
- Paratriarius difformis (Jacoby, 1887)
- Paratriarius dorsatus (Say, 1824)
- Paratriarius flavifrons (Jacoby, 1886)
- Paratriarius flavocinctus (Baly, 1886)
- Paratriarius flavomarginatus (Baly, 1886)
- Paratriarius limbatipennis (Baly, 1889)
- Paratriarius longitarsis (Jacoby, 1887)
- Paratriarius nicaraguensis (Jacoby, 1887)
- Paratriarius ornatus (Baly, 1859)
- Paratriarius pulcher (Baly, 1865)
- Paratriarius rugatus (Baly, 1879)
- Paratriarius smaragdinus (Jacoby, 1887)
- Paratriarius staudingeri (Baly, 1889)
- Paratriarius subimpressus (Jacoby, 1886)
- Paratriarius suturalis (Baly, 1865)
- Paratriarius triplagiatus (Baly, 1859)
- Paratriarius tropica Weise, 1916
- Paratriarius unifasciatus (Baly, 1889)
- Paratriarius zonula (Baly, 1889)
