= Paratriarius dorsatus =

Scientific classification
- Kingdom: Animalia
- Phylum: Arthropoda
- Clade: Pancrustacea
- Class: Insecta
- Order: Coleoptera
- Suborder: Polyphaga
- Infraorder: Cucujiformia
- Family: Chrysomelidae
- Genus: Paratriarius
- Species: P. dorsatus

Binomial name
- Paratriarius dorsatus (Say, 1824)

Species of beetle

Paratriarius dorsatus is a species of skeletonizing leaf beetle in the family Chrysomelidae. It is found in North America.
