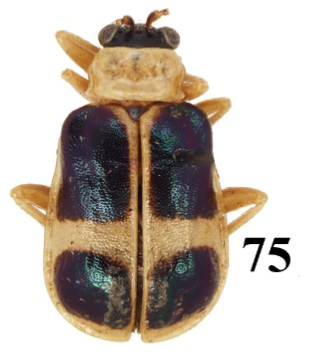

Scientific classification
- Kingdom: Animalia
- Phylum: Arthropoda
- Clade: Pancrustacea
- Class: Insecta
- Order: Coleoptera
- Suborder: Polyphaga
- Infraorder: Cucujiformia
- Family: Chrysomelidae
- Genus: Paratriarius
- Species: P. cruciatus

Binomial name
- Paratriarius cruciatus (Jacoby, 1887)

Synonyms
- Diabrotica cruciata Jacoby, 1887

= Paratriarius cruciatus =

Species of beetle

Paratriarius cruciatus is a species of beetle of the family Chrysomelidae. It is found in Argentina.
