= Kleptotype =

Type of specimen

In taxonomy, a kleptotype is an unofficial term referring to a stolen, unrightfully displaced type specimen or part of a type specimen.

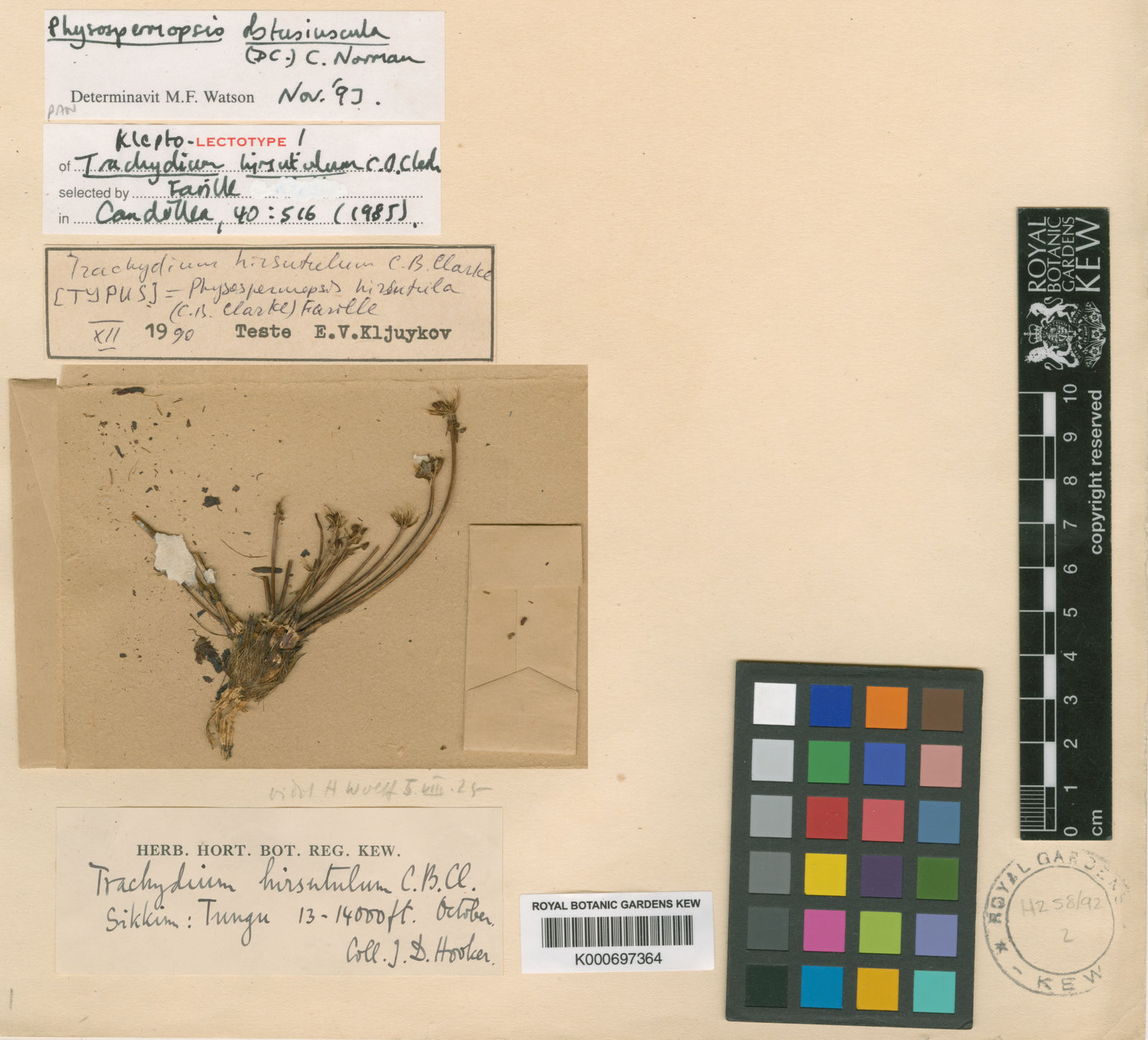
Kleptotype of Physospermopsis obtusiuscula (DC.) C.Norman

== Etymology ==
The term is composed of klepto-, from the Ancient Greek κλέπτω (kléptō) meaning "to steal", and -type referring to type specimens. It translates to "stolen type".

== History ==
During the Second World War biological collections, like the herbarium in Berlin have been destroyed. This led to the loss of type specimens. In some cases only kleptotypes have survived the destruction, as the type material had been removed from their original collections. For instance, the type of Taxus celebica was thought to be destroyed during the Second World War, but a kleptotype has survived the war in Stockholm.

Kleptotypes have been taken by researchers, who subsequently added their unauthorised type duplicates to their own collections.

== Consequences ==
Taking kleptotypes has been criticised as destructive, wasteful, and unethical. The displacement of type material complicates the work of taxonomists, as species identities may become ambiguous due to the lacking type material. It can cause problems, as researchers have to search in multiple collections to get a complete perspective on the displaced material. To combat this issue it has been proposed to weigh specimens before loaning types, and to identify loss of material through comparing the types weight upon return. Also, in some herbaria, such as the herbarium Kew, specimens are glued to the herbarium sheets to hinder the removal of plant material. However, this also makes it difficult to handle the specimens.

== Rules concerning type specimens ==
The International Code of Nomenclature for algae, fungi, and plants (ICN) does not explicitly prohibit the removal of material from type specimens, however it strongly recommends to conserve the type specimens properly. It is paramount that types remain intact, as they are an irreplaceable resource and point of reference.
