= Principle of typification =

Guiding principle in biological nomenclature

In biological nomenclature, the principle of typification is one of the guiding principles.

The International Code of Zoological Nomenclature provides that any named taxon in the family group, genus group, or species group have a name-bearing type which allows the name of the taxon to be objectively applied. The type does not define the taxon: that is done by a taxonomist; and an indefinite number of competing definitions can exist side by side. Rather, a type is a point of reference. A name has a type, and a taxonomist (having defined the taxon) can determine which existing types fall within the scope of the taxon. They can then use the rules in the Code to determine the valid name for the taxon.

== See also ==
- Type (biology)
- Type species
- Type genus
