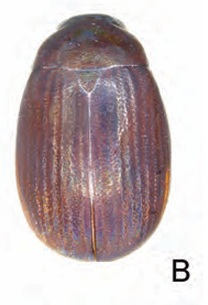

Scientific classification
- Kingdom: Animalia
- Phylum: Arthropoda
- Class: Insecta
- Order: Coleoptera
- Suborder: Polyphaga
- Infraorder: Scarabaeiformia
- Family: Scarabaeidae
- Genus: Maladera
- Species: M. calicutensis

Binomial name
- Maladera calicutensis (Frey, 1972)

Synonyms
- Autoserica calicutensis Frey, 1972

= Maladera calicutensis =

Species of beetle

Maladera calicutensis is a species of beetle of the family Scarabaeidae. It is found in India (Karnataka, Kerala, Tamil Nadu).

== Description ==
Adults reach a length of about 8.7 mm. They have a dark brown, oval body. The dorsal surface is mostly dull and nearly glabrous, except for the lateral setae of the elytra and pronotum.
