= Maladera madurensis =

Scientific classification
- Kingdom: Animalia
- Phylum: Arthropoda
- Clade: Pancrustacea
- Class: Insecta
- Order: Coleoptera
- Suborder: Polyphaga
- Infraorder: Scarabaeiformia
- Family: Scarabaeidae
- Genus: Maladera
- Species: M. madurensis

Binomial name
- Maladera madurensis (Moser, 1915)

Synonyms
- Autoserica madurensis Moser, 1915

Species of beetle

Maladera madurensis is a species of beetle of the family Scarabaeidae. It is found in India (Tamil Nadu).

== Description ==
Adults reach a length of about 10.1 mm. They have a dark brown, oval body. The dorsal surface is mostly dull and nearly glabrous, except for the lateral setae of the elytra and pronotum.
