= Zombie taxon =

Type of fossil

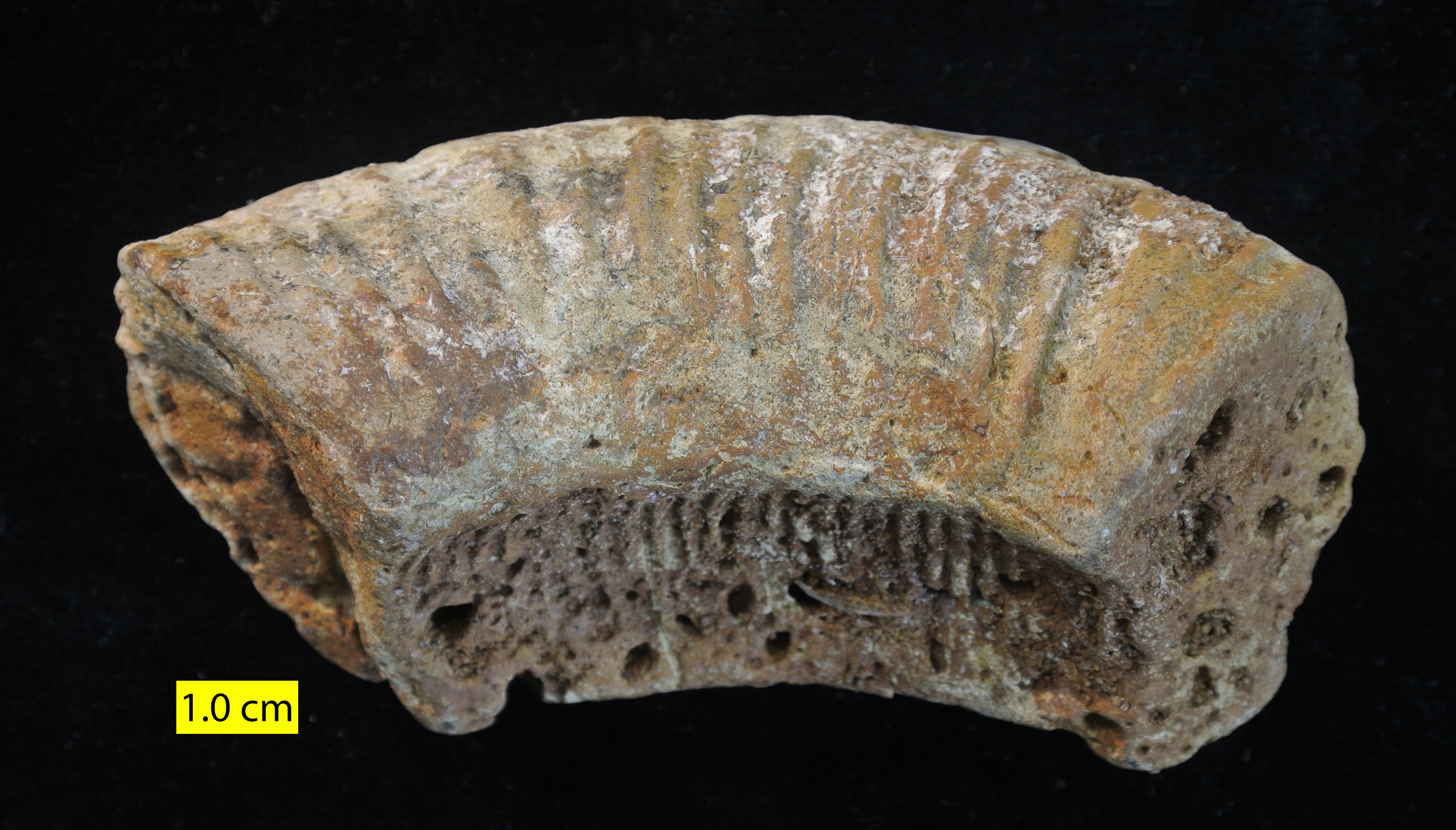
Jurassic ammonite internal mold redeposited (and bored) in a Cretaceous sediment, thus a zombie taxon or remanié; Faringdon Sponge Gravel, England.

In paleontology, a zombie taxon (plural zombie taxa) is a fossil that was washed out of sediments and re-deposited in rocks and/or sediments millions of years younger. That basic mistake in the interpretation of the age of the fossil leads to its title, in that the discovered fossil was at some point mobile (or "walking") despite the original organism having been long dead. When that occurs, the fossil is described as a "reworked fossil".

The phenomenon of zombie taxa is called the zombie effect.

== See also ==
- Convergent evolution
- Dead clade walking
- Extinction
- Elvis taxon
- Lazarus taxon
- Living fossil
