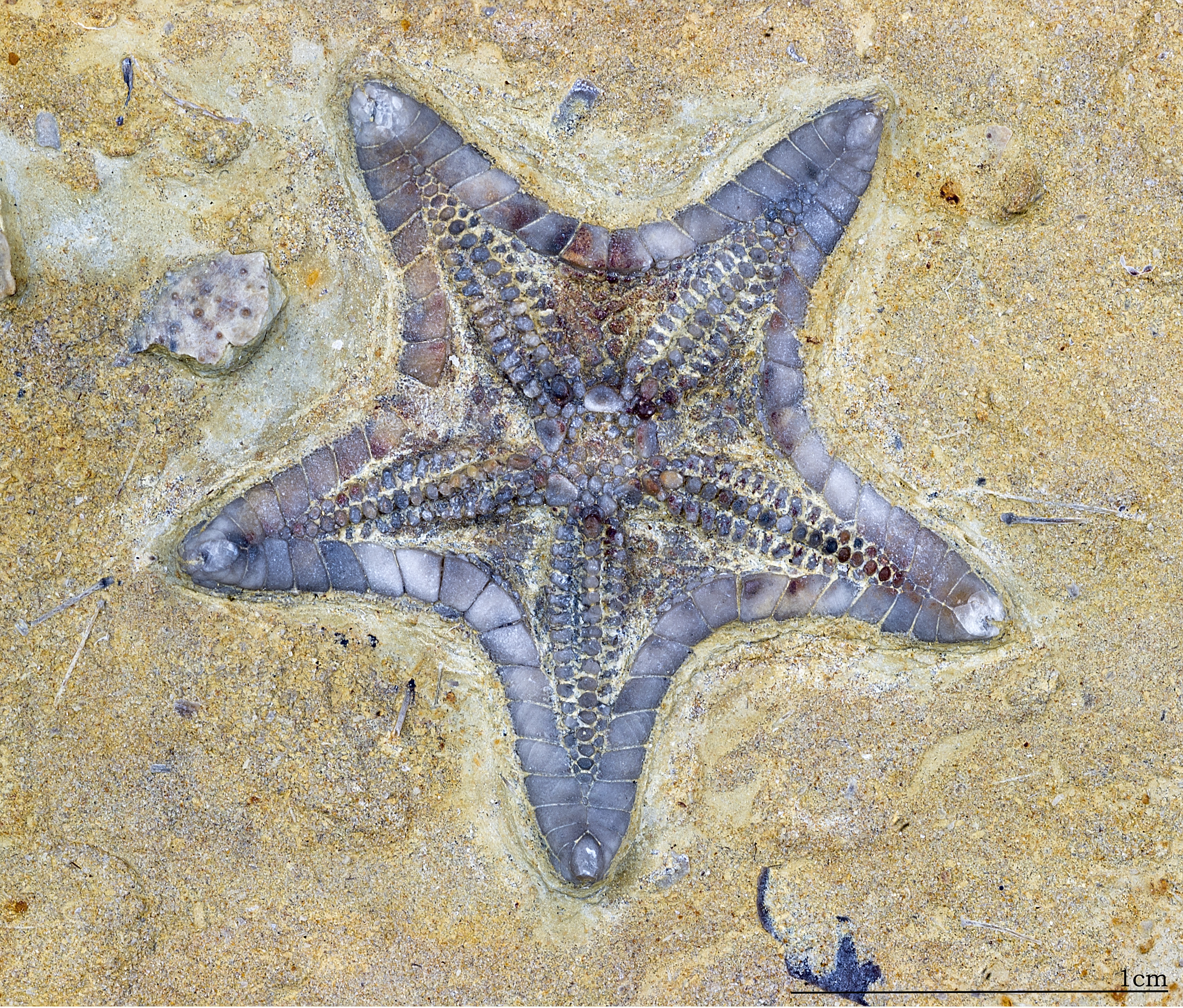
- Marocaster coronatus – Holotype- Muséum de Toulouse

Scientific classification
- Kingdom: Animalia
- Phylum: Echinodermata
- Class: Asteroidea
- Order: Valvatida
- Family: Goniasteridae
- Genus: †Marocaster; Blake & Reboul, 2011
- Species: †M. coronatus

Binomial name
- †Marocaster coronatus Blake & Reboul, 2011

= Marocaster =

Marocaster Temporal range: 130–125.45 Ma

Extinct genus of starfishes

Marocaster is an extinct genus of sea stars in the family Goniasteridae. It existed in what is now Morocco during the early Cretaceous period. It was described by Daniel B. Blake and Roland Reboul in 2011, and the type species (and only species) is Marocaster coronatus.
