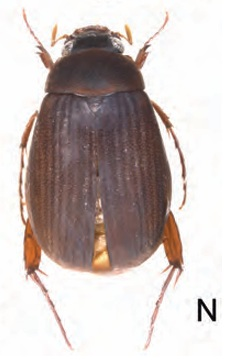

Scientific classification
- Kingdom: Animalia
- Phylum: Arthropoda
- Clade: Pancrustacea
- Class: Insecta
- Order: Coleoptera
- Suborder: Polyphaga
- Infraorder: Scarabaeiformia
- Family: Scarabaeidae
- Genus: Maladera
- Species: M. drescheri

Binomial name
- Maladera drescheri (Moser, 1913)

Synonyms
- Autoserica drescheri Moser, 1913; Autoserica dalatensis Frey, 1969

= Maladera drescheri =

Species of beetle

Maladera drescheri is a species of beetle of the family Scarabaeidae. It is found in India (Assam, Manipur, Meghalaya, Mizoram, West Bengal), Indonesia (Java), Laos, Malaysia (including Sabah, Sarawak), Sri Lanka, Thailand, Vietnam and China (Guangdong, Yunnan).

== Description ==
Adults reach a length of about 9.8–11 mm. They have a dark brown, oval body. The upper surface is mostly dull and glabrous, except for some setae on the head and the lateral cilia of the pronotum and elytra.
