= Name-bearing type =

Under the International Code of Zoological Nomenclature (Code), the name-bearing type or onomatophore is the biological type that determines the application of a name. Each animal taxon regulated by the Code at least potentially has a name-bearing type. The name-bearing type can be either a type genus (family group), type species (genus group), or one or more type specimens (species group). For example, the name Mabuya maculata (Gray, 1839) has often been used for the Noronha skink (currently Trachylepis atlantica), but because the name-bearing type of the former, a lizard preserved in the Muséum national d'histoire naturelle in Paris, does not represent the same species as the Noronha skink, the name maculata cannot be used for the latter.

== Effect on synonymy ==
Under the ICZN, two names of the same rank that have the same name-bearing type are objective synonyms, as are two whose name-bearing types are themselves objectively synonymous names; for example, the names Didelphis brevicaudata Erxleben, 1777, and Didelphys brachyuros Schreber, 1778, were both based on a specimen (now in the British Museum of Natural History) described by Seba in 1734 and are therefore objective synonyms (the species they refer to, a small South American opossum, is currently known as Monodelphis brevicaudata). In contrast, a subjective synonym is based on a different name-bearing type, but is regarded as representing the same taxon; for example, the name Viverra touan Shaw, 1800, is based on a different name-bearing type (a specimen in the Field Museum of Natural History), but is currently regarded as representing the same species as Didelphis brevicaudata and Didelphys brachyuros.

== Family group ==
"Family-group" ranks include the superfamily and all other ranks below it and above the genus, including the family and tribe. The name of a family-group taxon is based on the stem of a designated type genus; for example, the Central American rodent tribe Nyctomyini has Nyctomys as its type genus and its name consists of the stem of the type genus, Nyctomy-, and the appropriate ending for a tribe, -ini.

== Genus group ==
"Genus group" ranks consist of the genus and subgenus. The name-bearing type for a genus-group taxon is the type species, which must be one of the species included when that taxon ("genus" hereafter for brevity) was first formally named or, when no species were included when the genus was named, one of the first species that were subsequently included in it. A genus described after 1930 (1999 for ichnotaxa) must have its type species fixed when first named; in taxa described earlier without such an explicit designation, the type species can be fixed subsequently. For example, the skink genus Euprepis contained nine species when first described by Wagler in 1830, but no type species was designated. In 2002, Mausfeld and others used the name for a mainly African group of skinks, designating Lacerta punctata Linnaeus, 1758, as the type species (currently Lygosoma punctatum), but in 2003, Bauer noted that Loveridge had already fixed the type species of Euprepis in 1957 as Scincus agilis (currently Mabuya agilis), invalidating the later fixation by Mausfeld and others. Accordingly, Euprepis is now a subjective synonym of Mabuya and the mostly African group Mausfeld and others incorrectly called Euprepis is known as Trachylepis.

== Species group ==
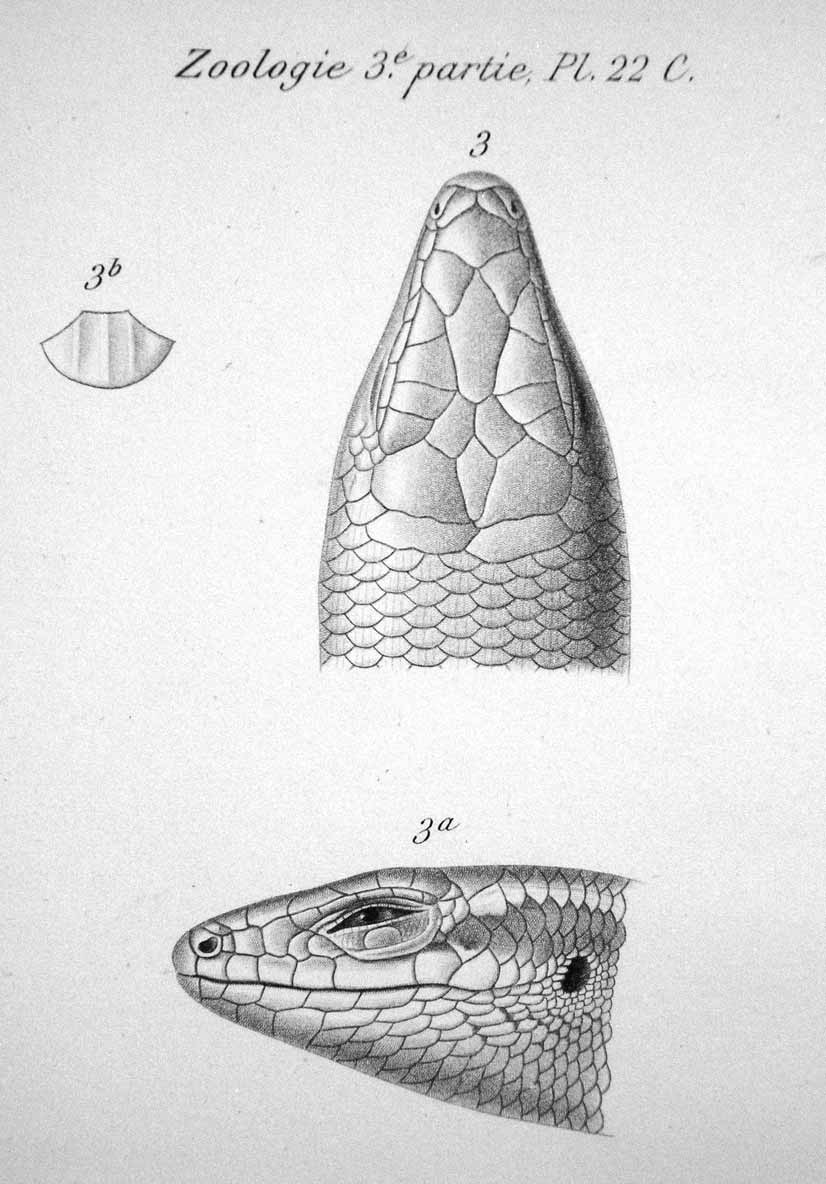
The lectotype of Trachylepis maculata.

Official "species-group" ranks consist of just the species and subspecies. (Note: a species group defined as a taxon, rather than as a category of ranks, has an unofficial rank, one of several such ranks between the subgenus and species levels sometimes used by zoologists in taxa with many species; see Taxonomic rank.) The name-bearing type of a species-group taxon (hereafter "species" for brevity) is an actual specimen or set of specimens; the Code recommends that great care should be exercised to ensure the preservation of such specimens. It can either be designated in the publication establishing the name or designated later. In the former case, there is either a single name-bearing type, a holotype, or a set of syntypes. In species named before 2000 without explicit designation of a holotype, all specimens in the type series are considered as syntypes. Name-bearing types designated after the original publication include lectotypes and neotypes. If a taxon has syntypes, one of those can be selected as the lectotype, upon which act the others lose the status of syntype. A neotype may be designated to replace the previous name-bearing type when the original type is lost or by application to the Commission when the previous name-bearing type cannot be identified. For example, Shaw's name Viverra touan was based on a description of "Le Touan" by Georges-Louis Leclerc, Comte de Buffon, which left the identity of the name uncertain, and in 2001 Voss and others selected as the neotype a specimen in the Field Museum of Natural History, which thereby becomes the name-bearing type.

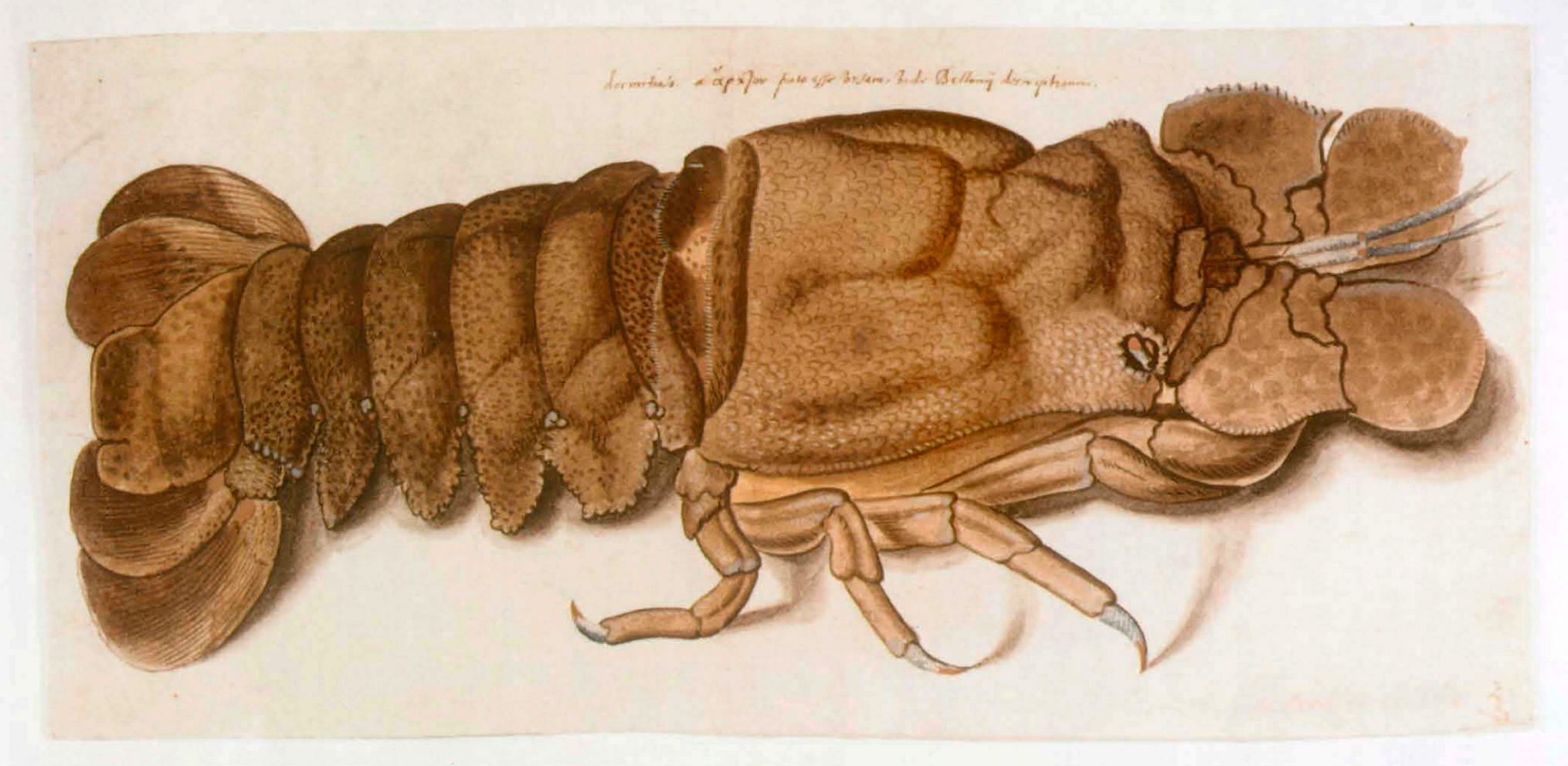
This watercolor painting illustrates the lectotype of the slipper lobster Scyllarides latus.

The name-bearing type is usually an individual animal in a museum collection; for example, the name-bearing type (in this case, lectotype) of the skink species currently known as Trachylepis maculata (Gray, 1839) is a lizard preserved in the collections of the French Muséum national d'histoire naturelle. Other kinds of name-bearing types are also allowed by the Code, including colonies of asexually reproducing animals, natural casts of fossils, a series of stages of the life cycle of a living protistan (a hapantotype), and some others. If an illustration or description is used as the basis of a species, the specimen or group of specimens illustrated or described is the name-bearing type (not the illustration or description itself), even if no longer in existence.

== See also ==
- Glossary of scientific naming

== Notes ==
References to "Code" refer to the International Code for Zoological Nomenclature (International Commission on Zoological Nomenclature, 1999).

== Literature cited ==
- Bauer, A.M. 2003. "On the identity of Lacerta punctata (Linnaeus 1758), the type species of the genus Euprepis (Wagler 1830), and the generic assignment of Afro-Malagasy skinks." African Journal of Herpetology 52:1–7.
- Groves, C.P. 2005. "Order Primates." Pp. 111–184 in Wilson, D.E. & Reeder, D.M. (eds.). Mammal Species of the World: a taxonomic and geographic reference, 3rd ed. Baltimore: Johns Hopkins University Press, 2 vols., 2142 pp. ISBN 978-0-8018-8221-0
- Holthuis, L.B. 1996. "Original watercolours donated by Cornelius Sittardus to Conrad Gesner, and published by Gesner in his (1558–1670) works on aquatic animals". Zoologische Mededelingen 70:169–196.
- International Commission on Zoological Nomenclature. 1999. International Code of Zoological Nomenclature, 4th ed. London: International Trust for Zoological Nomenclature. ISBN 0-85301-006-4
- Mausfeld, P. and Vrcibradic, D. 2002. On the nomenclature of the skink (Mabuya) endemic to the western Atlantic archipelago of Fernando de Noronha, Brazil (subscription only). Journal of Herpetology 36(2):292–295.
- Miralles, A., Chaparro, J.C. and Harvey, M.B. 2009. "Three rare and enigmatic South American skinks" (first page only). Zootaxa 2012:47–68.
- Musser, G.G. and Carleton, M.D. 2005. "Superfamily Muroidea." Pp. 894–1531 in Wilson, D.E. and Reeder, D.M. (eds.). "Mammal Species of the World: a taxonomic and geographic reference, 3rd ed." Baltimore: Johns Hopkins University Press, 2 vols., 2142 pp. ISBN 978-0-8018-8221-0
- Voss, R.S., Lunde, D.P. and Simmons, N.B. 2001. "The mammals of Paracou, French Guiana: a Neotropical lowland rainforest fauna. Part 2. Nonvolant species." Bulletin of the American Museum of Natural History 263:1–236.
