= Type genus =

Term in biological taxonomy

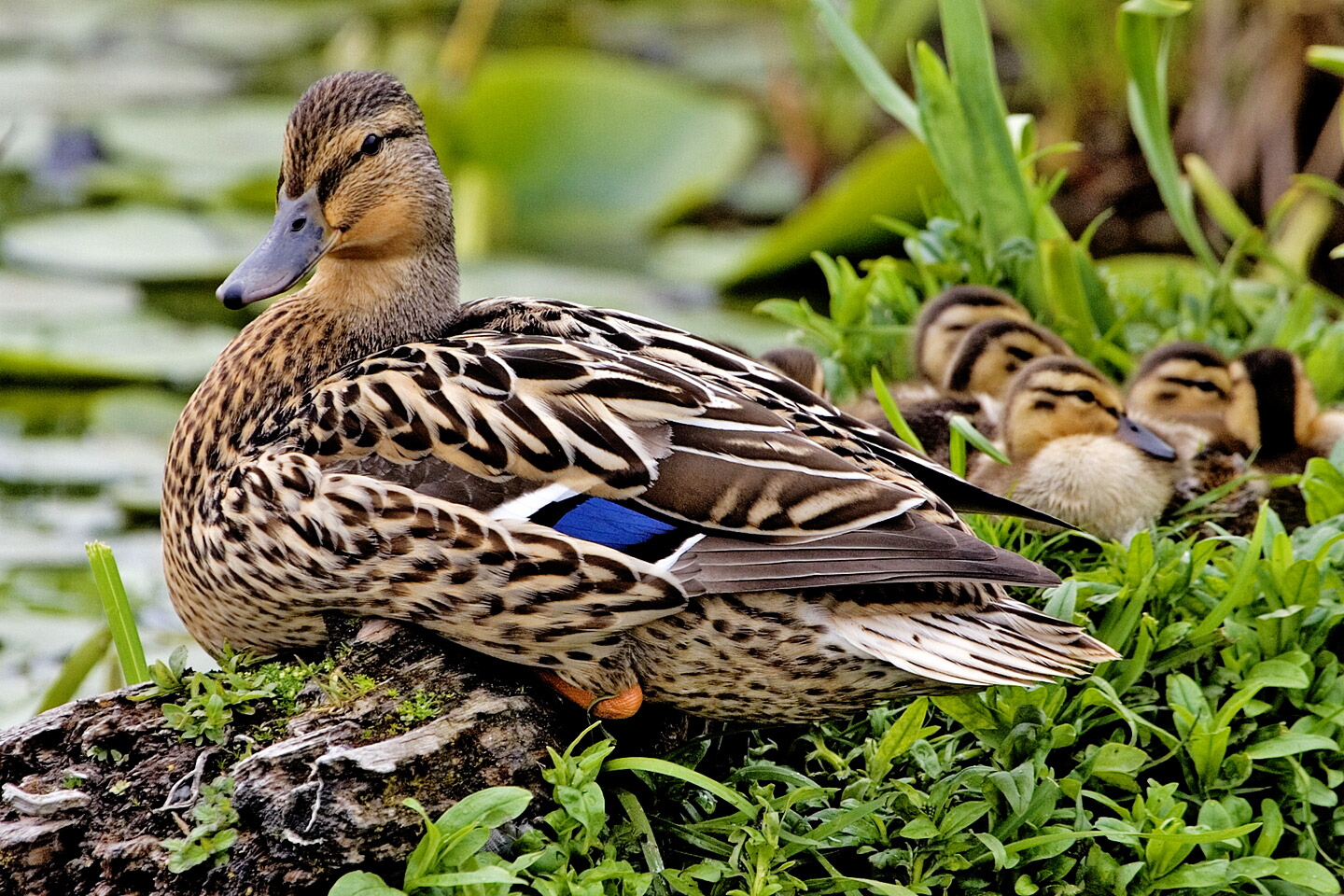
A female mallard (Anas platyrhynchos) and her clutch of ducklings. Anas is the type genus for the family Anatidae.

In biological taxonomy, the type genus (genus typica) is the genus which defines a biological family and the root of the family name.

== Zoological nomenclature ==
According to the International Code of Zoological Nomenclature, "The name-bearing type of a nominal family-group taxon is a nominal genus called the 'type genus'; the family-group name is based upon that of the type genus."

Any family-group name must have a type genus (and any genus-group name must have a type species, but any species-group name may, but need not, have one or more type specimens). The type genus for a family-group name is also the genus that provided the stem to which was added the ending -idae (for families).

Example: The family name Formicidae has as its type genus the genus Formica Linnaeus, 1758.

== Botanical nomenclature ==
In botanical nomenclature, the phrase "type genus" is used, unofficially, as a term of convenience. In the ICN this phrase has no status. The code uses type specimens for ranks up to family, and types are optional for higher ranks. The Code does not refer to the genus containing that type as a "type genus".

Example: "Poa is the type genus of the family Poaceae and of the order Poales" is another way of saying that the names Poaceae and Poales are based on the generic name Poa

== Bacteriological nomenclature ==
The 2008 Revision of the Bacteriological Code states, "The nomenclatural type […] of a taxon above genus, up to and including order, is the legitimate name of the included genus on whose name the name of the relevant taxon is based. One taxon of each category must include the type genus. The names of the taxa which include the type genus must be formed by the addition of the appropriate suffix to the stem of the name of the type genus[…]." In 2019, it was proposed that all ranks above genus should use the genus category as the nomenclatural type. This proposal was subsequently adopted for the rank of phylum.

Example: Pseudomonas is the type genus of the family Pseudomonadaceae, the order Pseudomonadales, and the phylum Pseudomonadota.

== See also ==
- Principle of Typification
- Type (biology)
- Type species
