= Elvis taxon =

Misidentification of later taxon superficially resembling earlier extinct taxon

In paleontology, an Elvis taxon (plural Elvis taxa) is a taxon that has been misidentified as having re-emerged in the fossil record after a period of presumed extinction, but is not actually a descendant of the original taxon, instead having developed a similar morphology by convergent evolution. This implies that the extinction of the original taxon is real, and one taxon containing specimens from before and after the extinction would be polyphyletic.

== Etymology ==
The term "Elvis taxon" was coined by D. H. Erwin and M. L. Droser in a 1993 paper to distinguish descendant from non-descendant taxa:

Rather than continue the biblical tradition favored by Jablonski [for Lazarus taxa], we prefer a more topical approach and suggest that such taxa should be known as Elvis taxa, in recognition of the many Elvis impersonators who have appeared since the death of The King.

== Related but distinctive concepts ==
By contrast, a Lazarus taxon is one that really is a descendant of the original taxon, and highlights transitional fossil records, which might be found later.

A zombie taxon has been considered a Lazarus taxon because it has been collected from younger strata, but it later turns out to be a fossil that was freed from the original seam and was refossilized in a sediment of a younger age. An example is a trilobite that gets eroded out of its Cambrian-aged limestone matrix and reworked into Miocene-aged siltstone.

== Examples ==
- Rhaetina gregaria, one of the most common Late Triassic brachiopod species, has been regarded as a survivor that ranges across the Triassic-Jurassic boundary into the Early Jurassic. The external morphology of specimens from before and after the Triassic–Jurassic extinction event were initially thought to be identical. Study of the internal features of the early Jurassic material showed that it was actually quite distinct from the Triassic specimens, and should be assigned to the genus Lobothyris as L. subgregaria.
- The flightless bird Aldabra rail became extinct approximately 136,000 years ago following sea level rise and the total inundation of the island of Aldabra it inhabited. Fossil evidence suggests this species reappeared approximately 100,000 years ago when sea levels dropped and related species reinhabited the island, from which the modern white-throated rail evolved, where it is found to the present day.

== See also ==
- Iterative evolution
- Living fossil
- Sightings of Elvis Presley
