= Syntype =

Taxonomic term

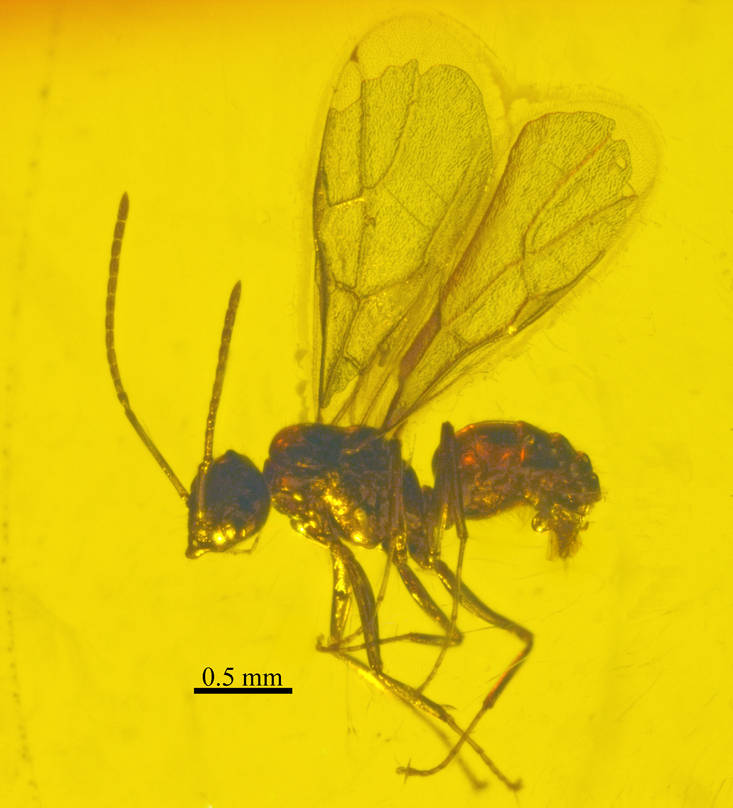
Close-up profile view of a Nylanderia pygmaea syntype male preserved in Baltic amber at the Natural History Museum, Vienna

In biological nomenclature, a syntype is any one of two or more biological specimens, or types, used to scientifically describe a taxon, where no single type has been given primacy. It is different from a holotype, a single specimen used to define a species. Precise definitions of this and related terms for types have been established as part of the International Code of Zoological Nomenclature and the International Code of Nomenclature for algae, fungi, and plants.

== In zoology ==
In zoological nomenclature, a syntype is defined as "Each specimen of a type series (q.v.) from which neither a holotype nor a lectotype has been designated [Arts. 72.1.2, 73.2, 74]. The syntypes collectively constitute the name-bearing type." (Glossary of the zoological Code).

Historically, it was common to describe a new species or subspecies from several syntypes without designating a holotype, but this practice is generally frowned upon by modern taxonomists, and most are gradually being replaced by lectotypes. Those that still exist are still considered name-bearing types. A lectotype may be designated from among the syntypes, reducing the other specimens to the status of paralectotype. They are no longer name-bearing types, though if the lectotype is lost or destroyed, it is generally preferable to use a paralectotype as a replacement (neotype). Where specimens in a syntype series are found to belong to different taxa, this may cause nomenclatural instability, since the nominal species can be interpreted in different ways.

== In botany ==
In botanical nomenclature, a syntype can be made in the description of a species or an infraspecific taxon. It is defined as "any specimen cited in the protologue when there is no holotype, or any one of two or more specimens simultaneously designated as types." (Art. 9.5).

== See also ==
- Type (biology)
