= Trachylepis tschudii =

Scientific classification
- Kingdom: Animalia
- Phylum: Chordata
- Class: Reptilia
- Order: Squamata
- Family: Scincidae
- Genus: Trachylepis
- Species: T. tschudii

Binomial name
- Trachylepis tschudii Miralles, Chaparro, and Harvey, 2009

Synonyms
- Trachylepis (Xystrolepis) punctata Tschudi, 1845 (Note: Preoccupied by Lacerta punctata Linnaeus, 1758 (=Lygosoma punctatum) and Tiliqua punctata Gray, 1839 (=Trachylepis atlantica).); Mabuia punctata: Roux, 1907; Trachylepis tschudii Miralles et al., 2009 (Note: Nomen novum (replacement name) for punctata Tschudi, 1845, not Linnaeus, 1758, or Gray, 1839.)

Species of lizard

Trachylepis tschudii is an enigmatic skink, purportedly from Peru. First described in 1845 on the basis of a single specimen, it may be the same as the Noronha skink (T. atlantica) from Fernando de Noronha, off northeastern Brazil. T. tschudii represents one of two doubtful records of the otherwise African genus Trachylepis on mainland South America; the other is T. maculata from Guyana.

The only specimen, the holotype, is mostly brownish above, with dark and light spots, and white below. The snout-to-vent length is 83 mm (3.3 in). Several features of the scales align it with Trachylepis over the related American genus Mabuya.

== Taxonomy ==
In 1845, Swiss zoologist Johann Jakob von Tschudi described the new species Trachylepis (Xystrolepis) punctata among other species he had collected in Peru. The species was recorded as being from the "forest region" (Amazonia) of Peru and was known from a single specimen, the holotype. In 1887, G.A. Boulenger placed it at an uncertain position within the genus Mabuia, which included Tschudi's Trachylepis. In a 1907 reappraisal of some of Tschudi's reptiles and amphibians, J. Roux redescribed punctata under the name "Mabuia punctata", but did not comment on its affinities. In 1935, E.R. Dunn reviewed some American Mabuya and commented that he was unable to tell the identity of punctata, but that it probably was not a true Mabuya.

Writing in 1946, H. Travassos considered Tschudi's punctata to be identical to the Noronha skink (then known as Mabuya punctata), a species otherwise known only from Fernando de Noronha, a small archipelago off northeastern Brazil. On the basis of its geographic origin, J. Peters and R. Donoso-Barros preferred to place it with one of the Mabuya species of Amazonia and classified it as a junior synonym of Mabuya mabouya. In reviewing the nomenclature of the Noronha skink, P. Mausfeld and D. Vrcibradic noted in 2002 that Tschudi's name punctata was preoccupied within Mabuya, making it unavailable for use as a valid name. They were unable to examine the holotype and therefore did not comment on its affinities. In the same year, Mausfeld and others split the genus Mabuya, retaining most American species in Mabuya but placing the African species and the Noronha skink in a separate genus Euprepis; the latter name was later corrected to Trachylepis.

In 2009, A. Miralles and others reviewed Tschudi's species and re-examined the holotype. Like Mausfeld and Vrcibradic, they noted that the name punctata is preoccupied; earlier uses of the name in Trachylepis include Lacerta punctata Linnaeus, 1758, which they consider a synonym of Trachylepis homalocephala from South Africa, and Tiliqua punctata J.E. Gray, 1839, an earlier name for the Noronha skink. (The former was assigned to Lygosoma punctatum, a member of another skink genus, by Bauer in 2003.) Miralles and coworkers proposed a new name, Trachylepis tschudii, to replace Tschudi's name punctata; the new name honors Tschudi, who first described the animal. They assigned it to the genus Trachylepis, rather than Mabuya, on the basis of several characters of the external anatomy which it shares with the former, but were unable to resolve its placement within Trachylepis. It is distinct from T. maculata, a species recorded from Guyana that represents another doubtful mainland South American record of Trachylepis. They considered three hypotheses: (1) T. tschudii is a real, but very rare species from Amazonia; (2) T. tschudii is actually from somewhere in the Old World, but its origin was wrongly recorded; and (3) T. tschudii represents the same species as the Noronha skink, and it either represents an otherwise unknown Amazonian population of that species or actually comes from Fernando de Noronha and was mislabeled. Considering the close similarity between T. tschudii and the Noronha skink, they considered the third hypothesis to be most likely.

== Description ==
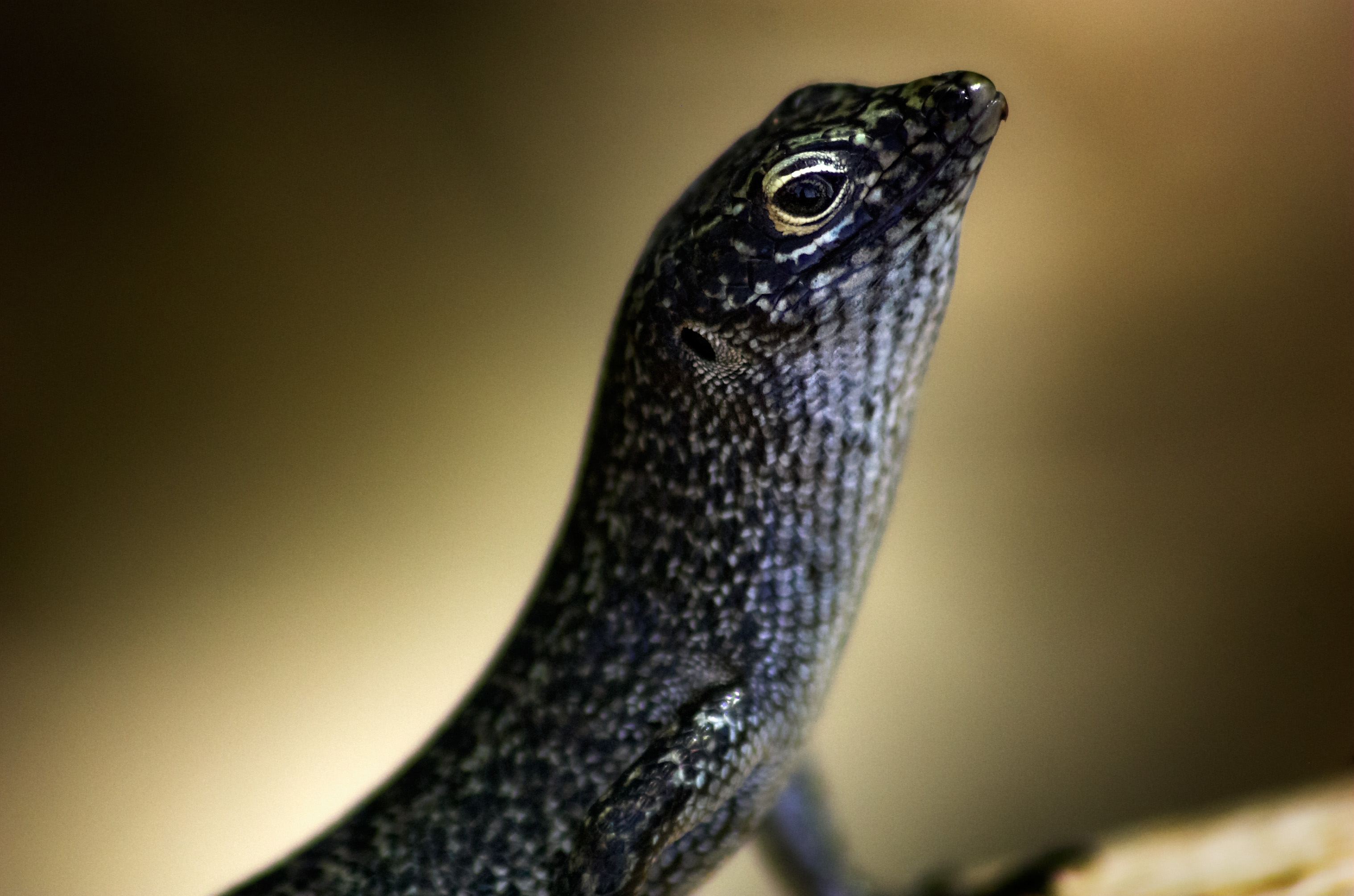
The Noronha skink may be the same species as Trachylepis tschudii.

The holotype and only known specimen, which is in very poor condition, is preserved in the Museum d'Histoire Naturel de Neuchâtel as specimen MHNN 91.2426. It has five auricular lobules in front of the ears on each side of the head, 39 rows of scales around the midbody, keels on its dorsal scales, and the third supraocular scale in contact with the frontal scale, all characters which align it with Trachylepis rather than Mabuya. The other putative mainland South American Trachylepis, T. maculata, has five instead of three keels, 32 to 34 midbody scales, and separated parietal scales. T. tschudii agrees with the Noronha skink in size, coloration, numbers of scales, and discrete characters, such as having the supranasal, parietal, and prefrontal scales all in contact.

The muzzle is narrow and long. The lower eyelid contains a large, transparent disk. The head is olive-brown. There are black scales with a white border between the eyes and the ears. The body is somewhat darker than the head and covered with irregular black and white spots above and is bluish white below. The limbs are yellowish white below. The tail is light brown above, but has two rows of darker spots, and yellowish white below. Snout-to-vent length is 83 mm (3.3 in), head length 10 mm (0.39 in), head width 6.5 mm (0.26 in), length of the body 33 mm (1.3 in), length of the forelimb 15 mm (0.59 in), length of the hindlimb 23 mm (0.91 in), and length of the (incomplete) tail 40 mm (1.6 in).

== Literature cited ==
- Bauer AM (2003). "On the identity of Lacerta punctata Linnaeus 1758, the type species of the genus Euprepis Wagler 1830, and the generic assignment of Afro-Malagasy skinks". African Journal of Herpetology 52: 1–7.
- Boulenger GA (1887). Catalogue of the Lizards in the British Museum (Natural History). Second Edition. Vol. III. Lacertidæ, Gerrosauridæ, Scincidæ, Anelytropidæ, Dibamidæ, Chamaeleonidæ . London: Trustees of the British Museum (Natural History). (Taylor and Francis, printers). xii + 575 pp. + Plates I–XL.
- Dunn ER (1935). "Notes on American Mabuyas" (subscription required). Proceedings of the Academy of Natural Sciences of Philadelphia 87: 533–557.
- Mausfeld P, Vrcibradic D (2002). "On the nomenclature of the skink (Mabuya) endemic to the western Atlantic archipelago of Fernando de Noronha, Brazil" (subscription required). Journal of Herpetology 36 (2): 292–295.
- Mausfeld P, Schmitz A, Böhme W, Misof B, Vrcibradic D, Duarte CF (2002). "Phylogenetic affinities of Mabuya atlantica Schmidt, 1945, endemic to the Atlantic Ocean archipelago of Fernando de Noronha (Brazil): Necessity of partitioning the genus Mabuya Fitzinger, 1826 (Scincidae: Lygosominae)" (subscription required). Zoologischer Anzeiger 241: 281–293.
- Miralles A, Chaparro JC, Harvey MB (2009). "Three rare and enigmatic South American skinks" (first page only). Zootaxa 2012: 47–68.
- Roux J (1907). "Revision de quelques espèces de reptiles et amphibiens du Pérou décrites par Tschudi en 1844–1846 ". Revue suisse de Zoologie 15: 293–302 (in French).
- Travassos H (1946). "Estudo da variação de Mabuya punctata (Gray, 1839) ". Boletim do Museu Nacional (Zoologia) 60: 1–56 (in Portuguese).
