= Mabuya maculata =

Mabuya maculata may refer to:

- Mabuya maculata (Demerara), a Guyanese skink
- Mabuya maculata (Fernando de Noronha), a Brazilian skink
