= Euprepius =

Euprepius is the given name of:

Ordered chronologically

- Euprepius of Verona (died end of 1st century or beginning of 2nd), Roman Catholic and Eastern Orthodox saint and first bishop of Verona
- Euprepius (died c. 287 or c. 303), martyr along with his brothers saints Cosmas and Damian
- Euprepius of Egypt, 4th-5th century Egyptian Orthodox Christian monk, ascetic, and saint

== See also ==
- Euprepis, an obsolete skunk genus
