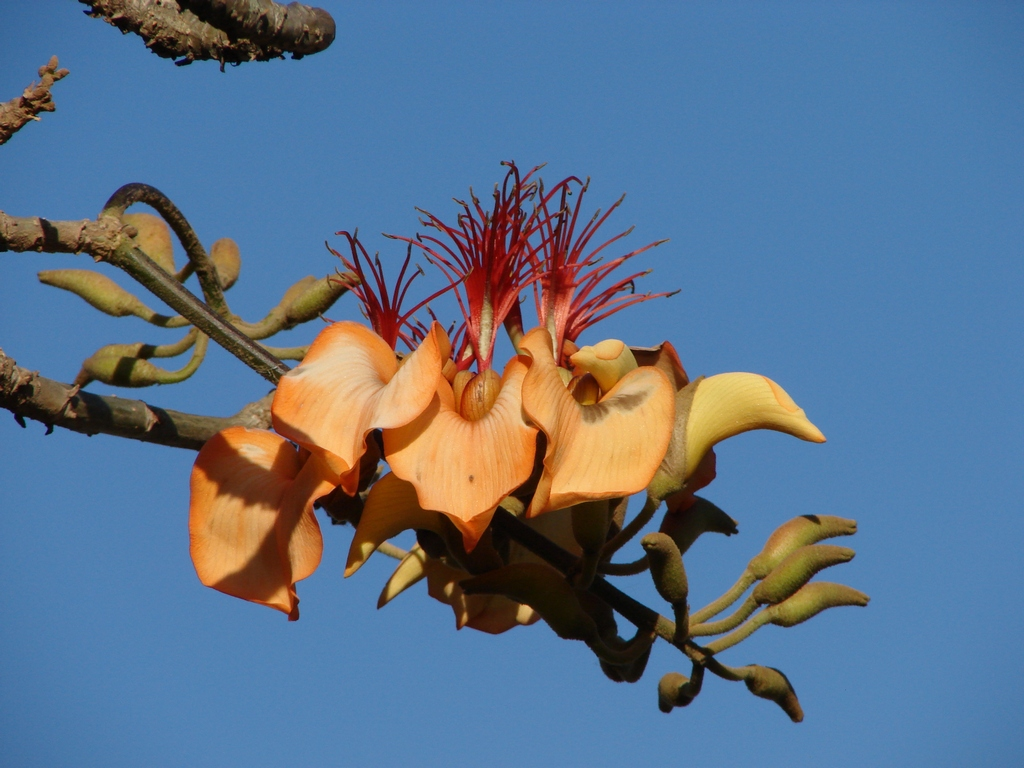
- Flower in Brisbane, Australia
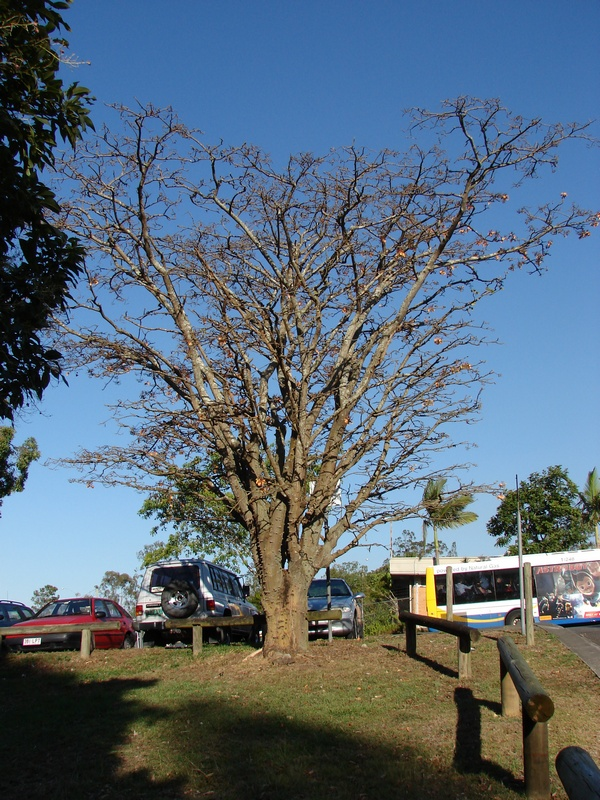
- Tree in Brisbane, Australia

Scientific classification
- Kingdom: Plantae
- Clade: Tracheophytes
- Clade: Angiosperms
- Clade: Eudicots
- Clade: Rosids
- Order: Fabales
- Family: Fabaceae
- Subfamily: Faboideae
- Genus: Erythrina
- Species: E. velutina

Binomial name
- Erythrina velutina Willd.

Synonyms
- Chirocalyx velutinus Wallp.; Corallodendron velutinum (Willd.) Kuntze; Erythrina aculeatissima Desf.; Erythrina aurantica Ridl.; Erythrina splendida Diels

= Erythrina velutina =

Species of legume

Erythrina velutina is a species of leguminous tree. It is indigenous to Brazil, Peru, Ecuador, Colombia, Venezuela, and Hispaniola and has been introduced to much of the Caribbean, Uganda, and Sri Lanka. It also occurs on the Galápagos Islands, but whether it is indigenous or introduced there is unclear. In Brazil, it occurs on plains and near rivers in the arid parts of the northeast of the country and is commonly known as "mulungu". Erythrina velutina grows as a large tree to around 10 m (30 ft) high and has short spines on the stem. It is perennial.

== Taxonomy ==
The species was first described in 1801 by Carl Ludwig Willdenow. Henry Nicholas Ridley described Erythrina aurantiaca as a species from Fernando de Noronha off the northeastern coast of Brazil, but this tree is now seen as only a form of E. velutina, Erythrina velutina f. aurantiaca.

== Blooming ==
On Fernando de Noronha, it flowers in the dry season. There are 10 to 26 flowers per inflorescence, of which one to eight open each day. Flowers open early in the morning, between 6 and 6:30 am. They remain open for two days, but produce nectar only the first day. All native land vertebrates of the island, including the Noronha dove (Zenaida auriculata noronha), vireo (Vireo gracilirostris), elaenia (Elaenia ridleyana), and skink (Trachylepis atlantica), pollinate the species on Fernando de Noronha. No other Erythrina species is pollinated by doves or lizards.

== Uses ==
In northeastern Brazil, the bark of E. velutina is used in traditional medicine against insomnia, convulsions, nervous coughs, and nervous excitation. Harvesting of bark for medicinal purposes poses a threat to the survival of the species; for this reason, several scientific studies of the medicinal effects of tree have used extract from the leaves instead. In laboratory mice and rats, E. velutina extract prolongs sleep, inhibits motorial activity, and inhibits memory.

Erythrina velutina contains the indole based alkaloid Hypaphorine which has shown sleep promoting effects in mice

== Toxicity ==
Its seeds are similar to beans, but are red and toxic. The seeds should not be ingested by the risk of death.

== Gallery ==
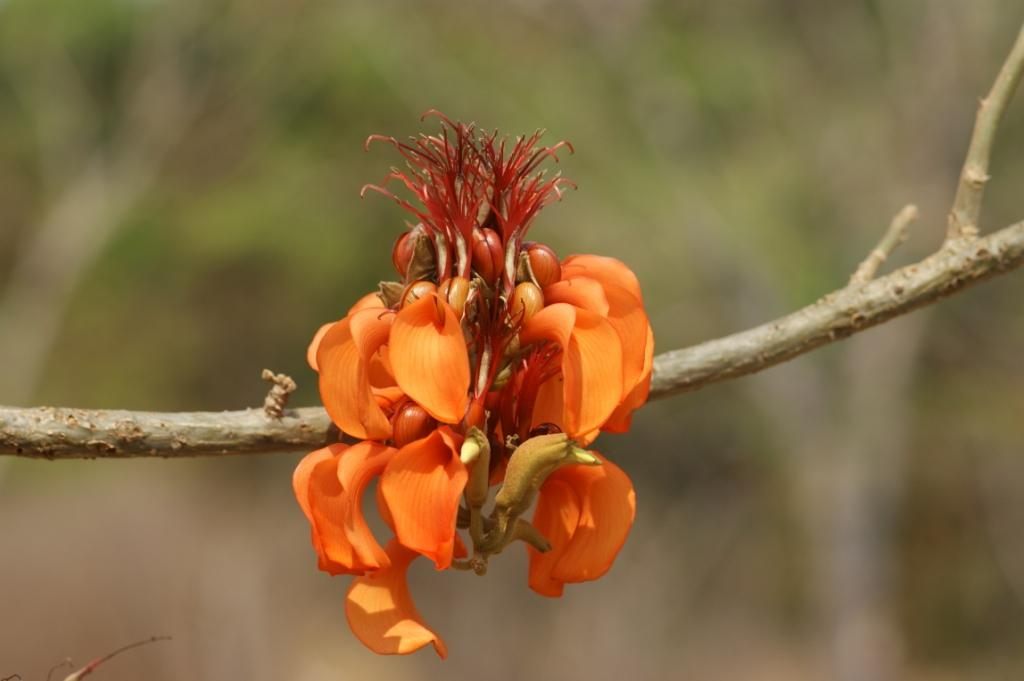
Flower

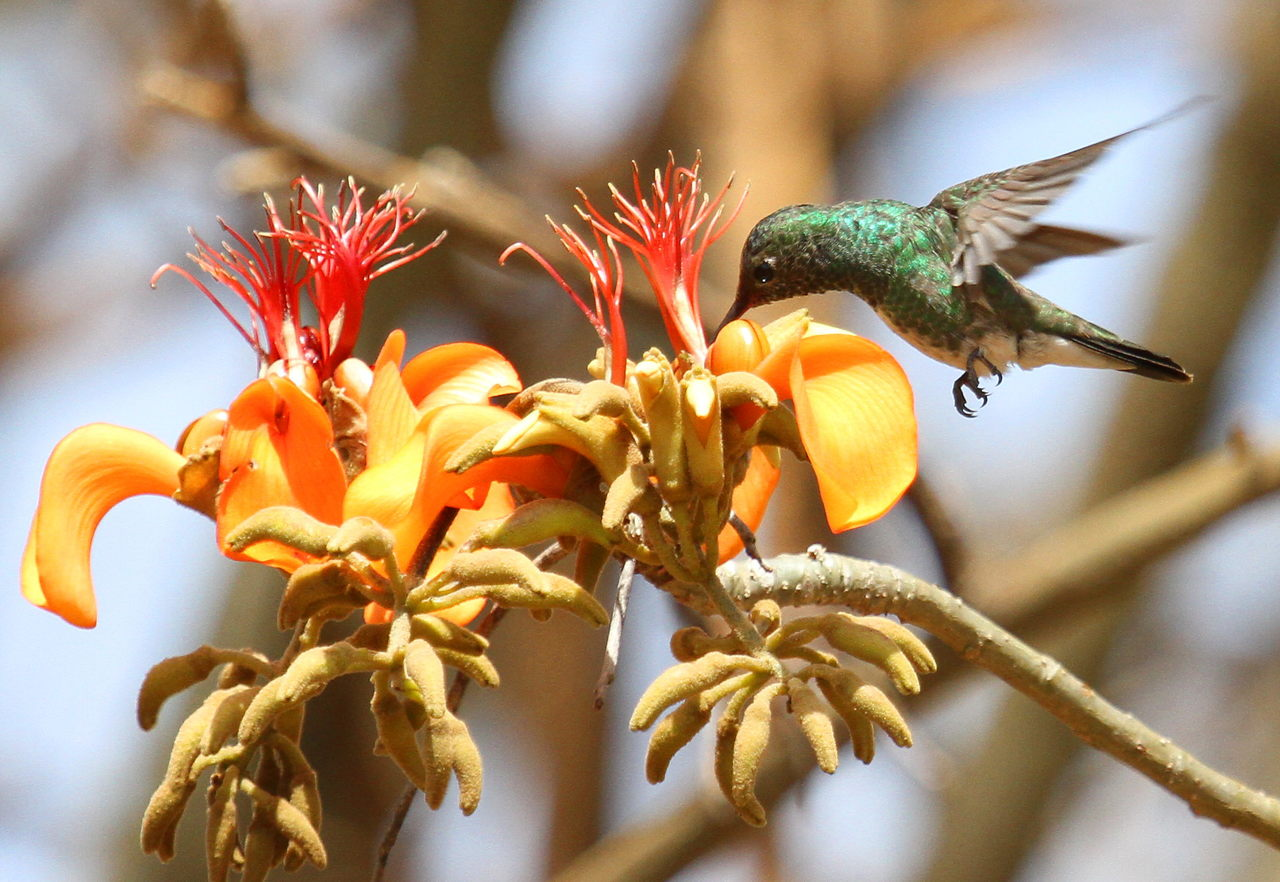
Hummingbird on flower

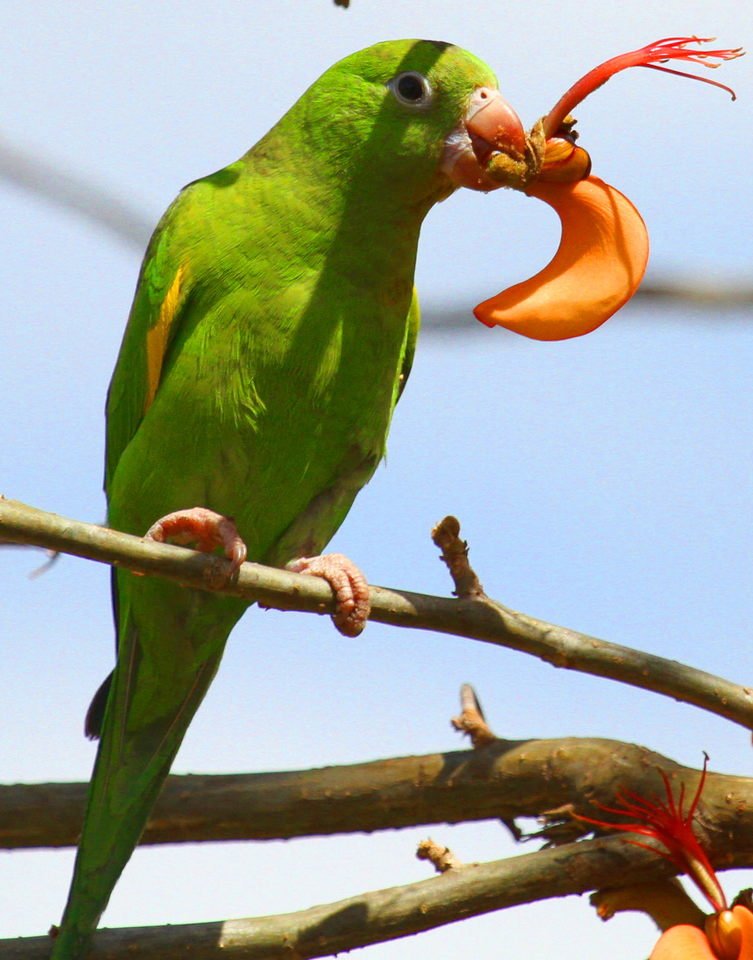
Yellow-chevroned parakeet eating flower

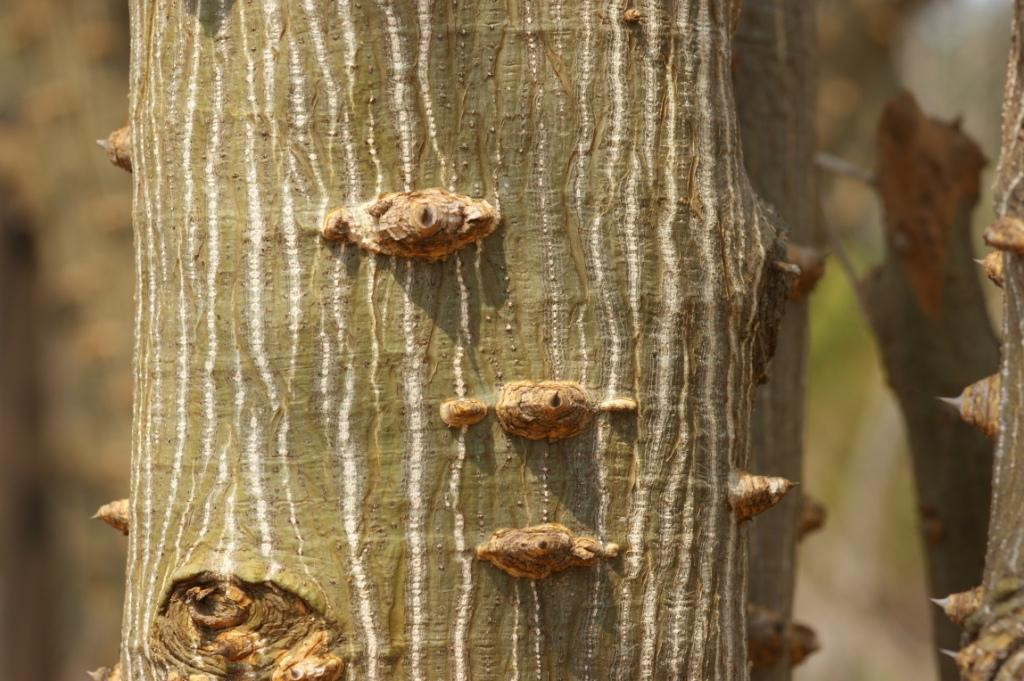
Trunk detail

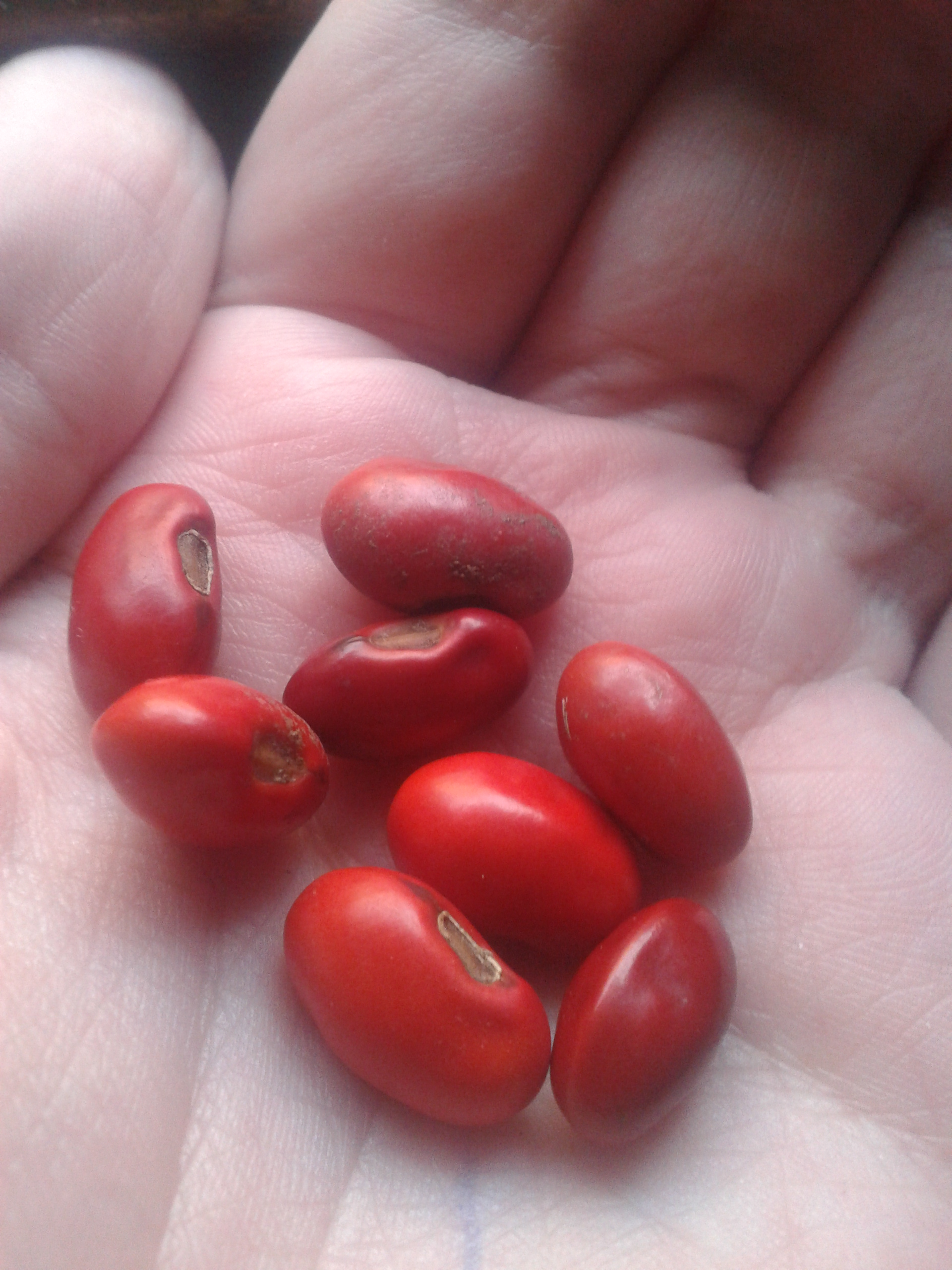
Seed

== Literature cited ==
- 2010. Erythrina velutina. LegumeWeb, International Legume Database & Information Service, version 10.01. Retrieved March 20, 2010.
- Carvalho, Ana Carla C.S.; Almeida, Dayse S.; Melo, Marcélia G.D.; Cavalcanti, Sócrates C.H.; Marçal, Rosilene M. (March 2009). "Evidence of the mechanism of action of Erythrina velutina Willd (Fabaceae) leaves aqueous extract". Journal of Ethnopharmacology. 122 (2): 374–378. doi:10.1016/j.jep.2008.12.019. PMID 19146942.
- Dantas, M.C; De Oliveira, F.S; Bandeira, S.M; Batista, J.S; Silva, C.D; Alves, P.B; Antoniolli, A.R; Marchioro, M (September 2004). "Central nervous system effects of the crude extract of Erythrina velutina on rodents". Journal of Ethnopharmacology. 94 (1): 129–133. doi:10.1016/j.jep.2004.05.007.
- Fawcett, William (1910). "Erythrina L". Flora of Jamaica, containing descriptions of the flowering plants known from the island. Vol. 4. Printed by order of the Trustees of the British Museum. pp. 50–51.
- Krukoff, B. A. (1979). "Notes on the Species of Erythrina. XII". Annals of the Missouri Botanical Garden. 66 (3): 422–445. doi:10.2307/2398836. JSTOR 2398836.
- Rabelo, Luiza Antas; de Fátima Agra, Maria; da-Cunha, Emidio Vasconcelos Leitão; da Silva, Marcelo Sobral; Maria Barbosa-Filho, José (1 May 2001). "Homohesperetin and phaseollidin from Erythrina velutina". Biochemical Systematics and Ecology. 29 (5): 543–544. doi:10.1016/S0305-1978(00)00077-6.
- Sazima, Ivan; Sazima, Cristina; Sazima, Marlies (2009). "A catch-all leguminous tree: Erythrina velutina visited and pollinated by vertebrates at an oceanic island". Australian Journal of Botany. 57 (1): 26–30. doi:10.1071/BT08179.
