= Oochoristica gymnophthalmicola =

Scientific classification
- Kingdom: Animalia
- Phylum: Platyhelminthes
- Class: Cestoda
- Order: Cyclophyllidea
- Family: Linstowiidae
- Genus: Oochoristica
- Species: O. gymnophthalmicola

Binomial name
- Oochoristica gymnophthalmicola Bursey, Goldberg & Telford, 2007

Species of flatworm

Oochoristica gymnophthalmicola is a species of gastrointestinal cestodes that completes its life cycle in lizards, first found in Panama.
