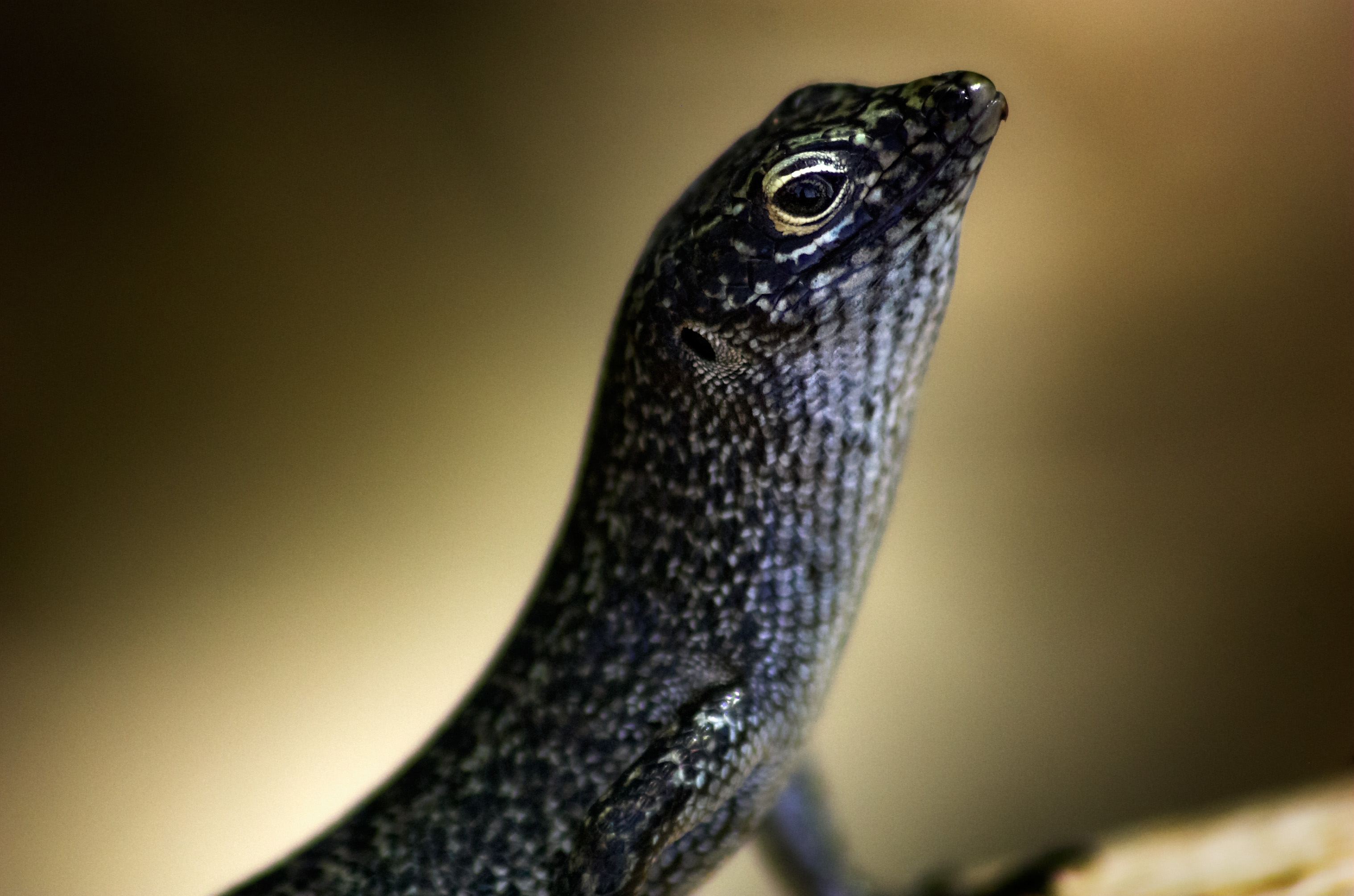

Conservation status
- Least Concern (IUCN 3.1)

Scientific classification
- Kingdom: Animalia
- Phylum: Chordata
- Class: Reptilia
- Order: Squamata
- Family: Scincidae
- Genus: Trachylepis
- Species: T. atlantica

Binomial name
- Trachylepis atlantica (Schmidt, 1945)
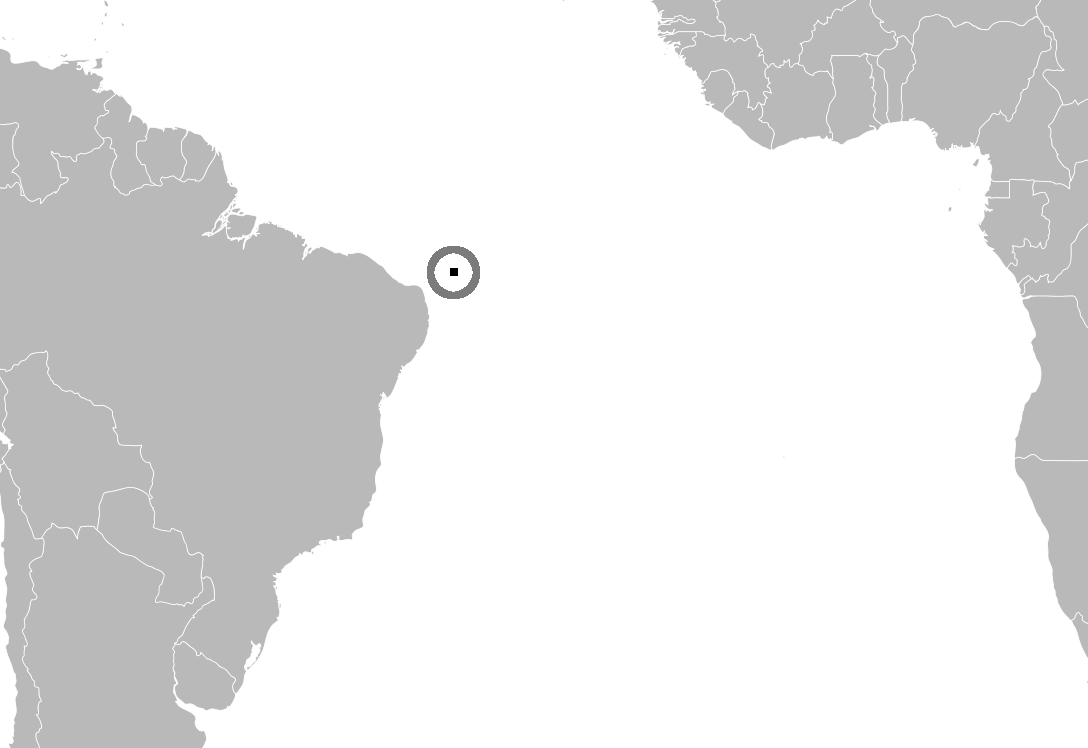
- Location of Fernando de Noronha, the island to which the Noronha skink is endemic.

Synonyms (Note: In this list of synonyms, new combinations (the first use of a given combination of a genus and species name) are indicated by a dash between the name combination and the authority which first used the combination. No dash is used when the name is entirely new.)
- Tiliqua punctata Gray, 1839 (Note: Preoccupied by Lacerta punctata Linnaeus, 1758 (=Lygosoma punctatum).); Euprepis punctatus — Gray, 1845; ?Trachylepis (Xystrolepis) punctata Tschudi, 1845 (Note: Preoccupied by Lacerta punctata Linnaeus, 1758 (=Lygosoma punctatum) and Tiliqua punctata Gray, 1839 (=Trachylepis atlantica).); Mabouya punctatissima O'Shaughnessy, 1874; Mabuia punctata — Boulenger, 1887 (Note: Sic. Included maculata Gray and Mabouya punctatissima O'Shaughnessy, 1872, as junior synonyms.); Mabuya maculata Andersson, 1900 (Note: In error; Mabuya maculata (currently Trachylepis maculata) is a species distinct from Trachylepis atlantica.); Mabuya punctata — C. Burt & M. Burt, 1931; Mabuya atlantica Schmidt, 1945 (Note: Nomen novum (replacement name) for punctata Gray, 1839, not Linnaeus, 1758.); Euprepis atlanticus — Mausfeld et al., 2002; Trachylepis atlantica — Ananjeva et al., 2006 (Note: Bauer, 2003, p. 5, corrected the generic name from Euprepis to Trachylepis, but did not explicitly use the name combination Trachylepis atlantica, which was first used by Ananjeva et al., 2006, p. 76.); ?Trachylepis tschudii Miralles et al., 2009 (Note: Nomen novum for punctata Tschudi, 1845, not Linnaeus, 1758, or Gray, 1839; identity uncertain (see text).)

= Noronha skink =

Species of skink

The Noronha skink (Trachylepis atlantica) is a species of skink from the island of Fernando de Noronha off northeastern Brazil. It is covered with dark and light spots on the upperparts and is usually about 7 to 10 cm (3 to 4 in) in length. The tail is long and muscular, but breaks off easily. Very common throughout Fernando de Noronha, it is an opportunistic feeder, eating both insects and plant material, including nectar from the Erythrina velutina tree, as well as other material ranging from cookie crumbs to eggs of its own species. Introduced predators such as feral cats prey on it and several parasitic worms infect it.

Perhaps seen by Amerigo Vespucci in 1503, it was first formally described in 1839. Its subsequent taxonomic history has been complex, riddled with confusion with Trachylepis maculata and other species, homonyms, and other problems. The species is classified in the otherwise mostly African genus Trachylepis and is thought to have reached its island from Africa by rafting. The enigmatic Trachylepis tschudii, supposedly from Peru, may well be the same species.

== Discovery and taxonomy ==
In an early account of what may be Fernando de Noronha, purportedly based on a voyage by Amerigo Vespucci in 1503, the island was said to be inhabited by "lizards with two tails", which is thought be a reference to the Noronha skink. The tail is long and fragile, and it breaks easily, like that of many skinks and other lizards, following which it may regenerate. However, when it does not completely break off, a new tail may nevertheless grow out of the broken part, so that the tail appears forked.

=== 19th century ===
The species was first formally described by John Edward Gray in 1839, based on two specimens collected by HMS Chanticleer before 1838. He introduced the names Tiliqua punctata, for the Noronha skink, and Tiliqua maculata, for a species from Guyana, among many others. Six years later, he transferred both to the genus Euprepis. In 1887, George Boulenger placed both in the genus Mabuya (misspelled "Mabuia") and considered them identical, using the name "Mabuia punctata" for the species, which was said to occur both on Fernando de Noronha and in Guyana. He also included Mabouya punctatissima O'Shaughnessy, 1874, purportedly from South Africa, as a synonym. In 1874, A.W.E. O'Shaughnessy described the new species Mabouya punctatissima on the basis of a specimen, purchased from a Mr. Parzudaki, which had been labeled as coming from the Cape of Good Hope, a location O'Shaughnessy considered "very doubtful". G.A. Boulenger, in 1887 synonymized it under Mabuia punctata (the Noronha skink) without comment, a position followed by H. Travassos with some doubt. The latter wrote that the description of punctatissima suggested to him that punctatissima and the Noronha skink are morphologically different, but that Boulenger's examination of the type and the uncertainty of the type locality inclined him to favor the synonymy. In 2002, P. Mausfeld and D. Vrcibradic re-examined the holotype, which is the only known specimen. It is similar to T. atlantica, but larger, and lacks well-developed keels on its dorsal scales. Therefore, they suggested that it was not the same as T. atlantica and that its original locality may have been correct. Although it may represent a valid species of southern African Trachylepis, the name Trachylepis punctatissima is preoccupied by Euprepes punctatissimus A. Smith, 1849, also currently placed in Trachylepis.

=== 20th century ===
In 1900, L.G. Andersson claimed that Gray's name punctata was preoccupied by Lacerta punctata Linnaeus, 1758, which he identified as Mabuya homalocephala. He therefore replaced the name punctata with its junior synonym maculata, using the name Mabuya maculata for the skink of Fernando de Noronha. Linnaeus's Lacerta punctata in fact refers to the Asian species Lygosoma punctatum, not to Mabuya homalocephala, but Gray's name punctata remains invalid regardless. In 1931, C.E. and M.D. Burt resurrected the name Mabuya punctata (now spelled correctly) for the Noronha skink, noting that it was "apparently a very distinct species", but did not mention maculata, and in 1935, E.R. Dunn disputed Boulenger's conclusion as to the synonymy of punctata and maculata and, in apparent ignorance of Andersson's work, restored the name Mabuya punctata for the Noronha skink. He wrote that the Noronha skink was very distinct from other American Mabuya and more similar in some respects to African species.

Karl Patterson Schmidt, in 1945, agreed with Dunn's conclusion that maculata and punctata of Gray were not the same, but he noted Andersson's point that punctata was preoccupied and therefore introduced the new name Mabuya atlantica to replace punctata. The next year, H. Travassos, disagreeing with Dunn and unaware of Andersson's and Schmidt's contributions, considered both of Gray's names to be synonymous and restored the name Mabuya punctata for the Noronha skink. He also considered Mabouya punctatissima and Trachylepis (Xystrolepis) punctata Tschudi, 1845, described from Peru, as synonyms of this species. In 1948, he acknowledged the preoccupation of punctata noted by Andersson and accordingly retired Mabuya punctata in favor of Mabuya maculata, as Andersson had done. The name Mabuya maculata remained in general usage for the Noronha skink in subsequent decades, though some have used Mabuya punctata, "not ... aware of the last nomenclatural changes."

=== 21st century ===
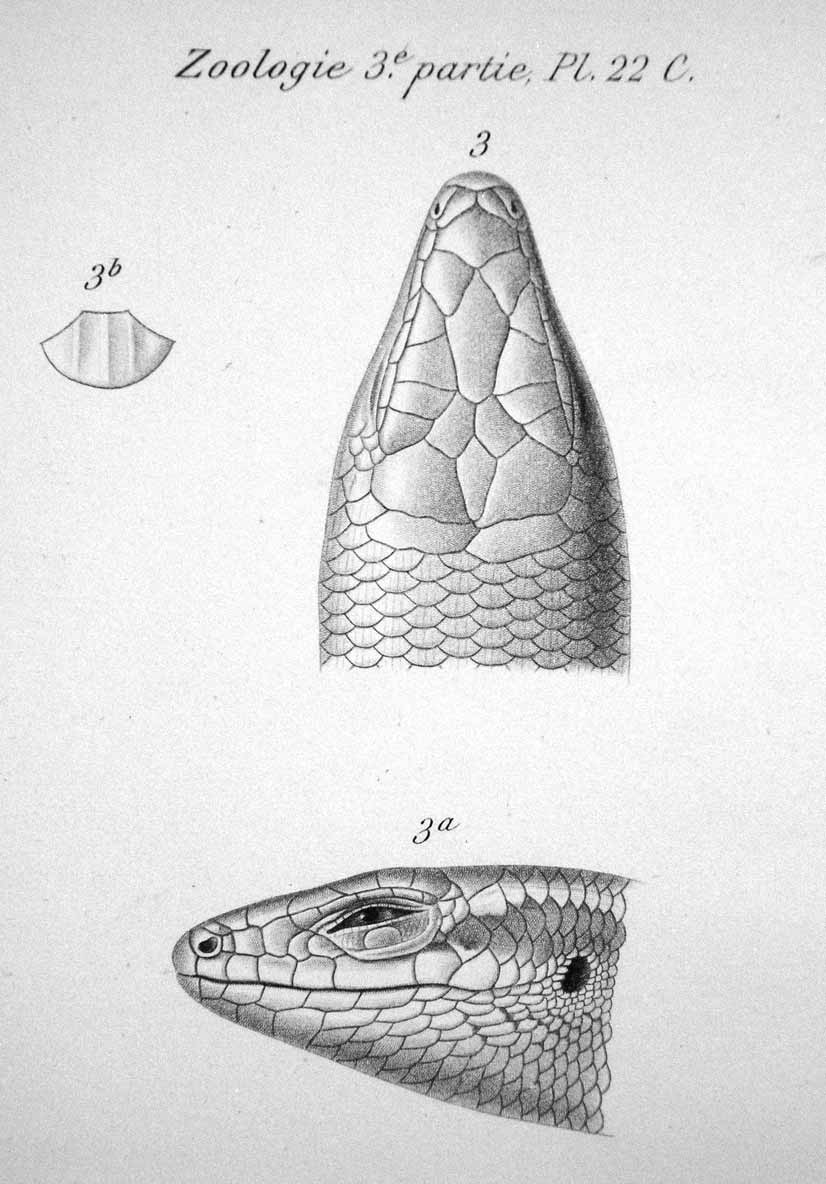
Trachylepis maculata has long been confused with the Noronha skink.

In 2002, P. Mausfeld and D. Vrcibradic published a note on the nomenclature of the Noronha skink informed by a re-examination of Gray's original type specimens; despite extensive attempts to correctly name the species, they were apparently the first to do so since Boulenger in 1887. Based on differences in the number of scales, subdigital lamellae (lamellae on the lower sides of the digits), and keels (longitudinal ridges) on the dorsal scales (located on the upperparts), as well as the separation of the parietal scales (on the head behind the eyes) in maculata, they concluded that the two were not, after all, identical, and that Schmidt's name Mabuya atlantica should therefore be used. Mausfeld and Vrcibradic considered Mabouya punctatissima to represent a different species on the basis of morphological differences, but were unable to resolve the status of Trachylepis (Xystrolepis) punctata.

In the same year, Mausfeld and others conducted a molecular phylogenetic study on the Noronha skink, using the mitochondrial 12S and 16S rRNA genes, and showed that the species is more closely related to African than to South American Mabuya species, as previously suggested on the basis of morphological similarities. They split the old genus Mabuya into four genera for geographically discrete clades, including Euprepis for the African–Noronha clade, thus renaming the Noronha species to Euprepis atlanticus. In 2003, A.M. Bauer found that the name Euprepis had been incorrectly applied to this clade and that Trachylepis was correct instead, so that the Noronha skink is currently referred to as Trachylepis atlantica. Additional molecular phylogenetic studies published in 2003 and 2006 confirmed the relationship between the Noronha skink and African Trachylepis.

In 2009, Miralles and others reviewed the taxon maculata and concluded that the animal now known as Trachylepis maculata also belongs in the African clade, but they were unable to determine whether or not it is indigenous to Guyana. They also reviewed Trachylepis (Xystrolepis) punctata and replaced it with Trachylepis tschudii because the older name was preoccupied by Linnaeus's and Gray's punctata. Although they were unable to resolve the identity of T. tschudii, which is still known from a single specimen, they believed that it is most likely the same species as the Noronha skink; it may be either a representative of an undiscovered Amazonian population of the latter or simply a mislabeled animal from Fernando de Noronha.

== Description ==
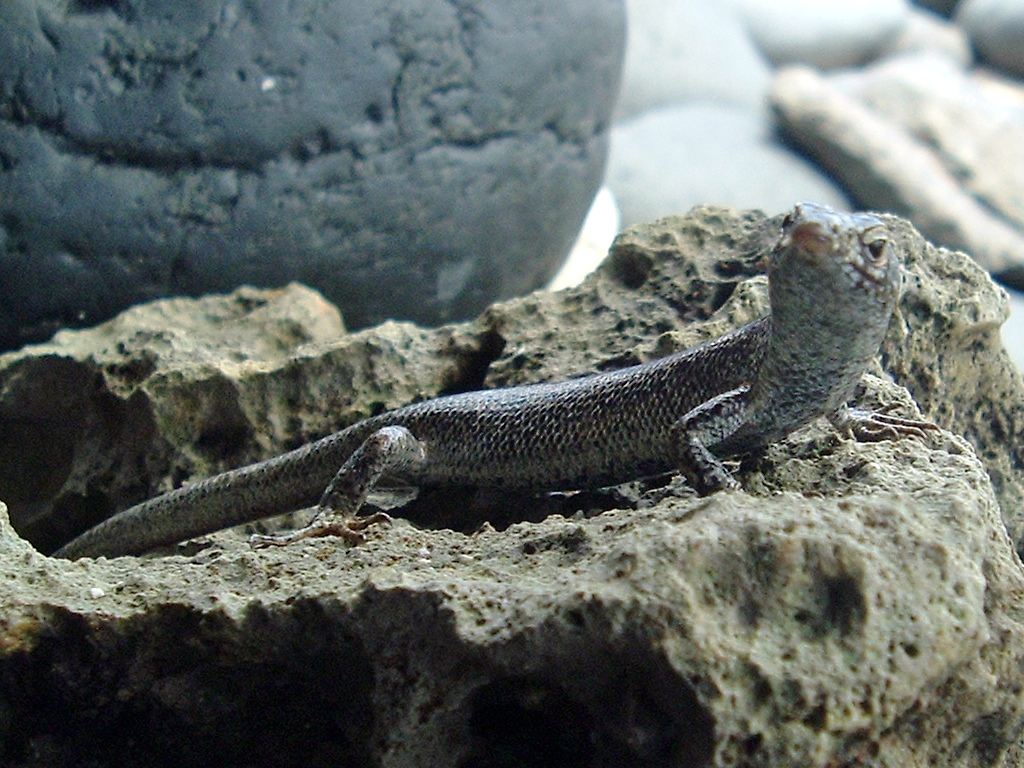
Noronha skinks are very common on Fernando de Noronha.

The Noronha skink is covered with light and dark spots above, but there is substantial variation in the precise colors. There are no longitudinal stripes. The scales on the underparts are yellowish or grayish. The eyelids are white to yellow. It has a small head with small nostrils, which are placed far to the front at the sides of the head. The mouth contains small and conical teeth and a thin but well-developed tongue. The eyes are small and placed laterally and contain dark, rounded irises. There are three to five well-developed auricular lobules (small projections) in front of the ears; these lobules are absent in true Mabuya. The hindlimbs are longer and stronger than the forelimbs, which are small. The tail is longer than the body and is muscular but very brittle. It is nearly cylindrical in form and tapers towards the end.

In reptiles, features of the scales are important in distinguishing among species and groups of species. In the Noronha skink, the supranasal scales (located above the nose) are in contact, as are the prefrontal scales (behind the nose) in most individuals. The two frontoparietal scales (above and slightly behind the eyes) are not fused. Unlike in T. maculata, the parietal scales (behind the frontoparietals) are in contact with each other. There are four supraocular scales (above the eyes) in almost all specimens and five supraciliary scales (immediately above the eyes, below the supraoculars). The dorsal scales (on the upperparts) have three keels, two fewer than in T. maculata. There are 34 to 40 (mode 38) midbody scales (counted around the body midway between the fore- and hindlimbs), 58 to 69 (mode 63–64) dorsal, and 66 to 78 (mode 70) ventral scales (on the underparts). Mabuya species and T. maculata generally have fewer midbody scales (up to 34). There are 21 to 29 subdigital lamellae under the fourth toe, more than in T. maculata, which has 18. The Noronha skink has 26 presacral vertebrae (located before the sacrum), similar to most Trachylepis, but unlike American Mabuya, which have at least 28.

Although there is substantial variation in measurements within the species, no discrete groups can be detected and it is not possible to separate the sexes unambiguously using measurements alone. Among 15 male and 21 female T. atlantica collected in 2006, snout to vent length was 80.6 to 103.1 mm (3.17 to 4.06 in), averaging 95.3 mm (3.75 in), in males and 65.3 to 88.1 mm (2.57 to 3.47 in), averaging 78.3 mm (3.08 in), in females and body mass was 10.2 to 26.0 g (0.36 to 0.92 oz), averaging 19.0 g (0.67 oz), in males and 6.0 to 15.0 g (0.21 to 0.53 oz), averaging 10.0 g (0.35 oz), in females. Males are significantly larger than females. In 100 specimens collected in 1876, head length was 12.0 to 18.9 mm (0.47 to 0.74 in), averaging 14.8 mm (0.58 in); head width was 7 to 14.4 mm (0.28 to 0.57 in), averaging 9 mm (0.35 in), and tail length was 93 to 170 mm (3.7 to 6.7 in), averaging 117 mm. (Note: Mausfeld and Vrcibradic, 2002, table 1, list the average tail length as 11 mm, an obvious error. The actual average tail length in Travassos's dataset is 117 mm.)

== Ecology and behavior ==
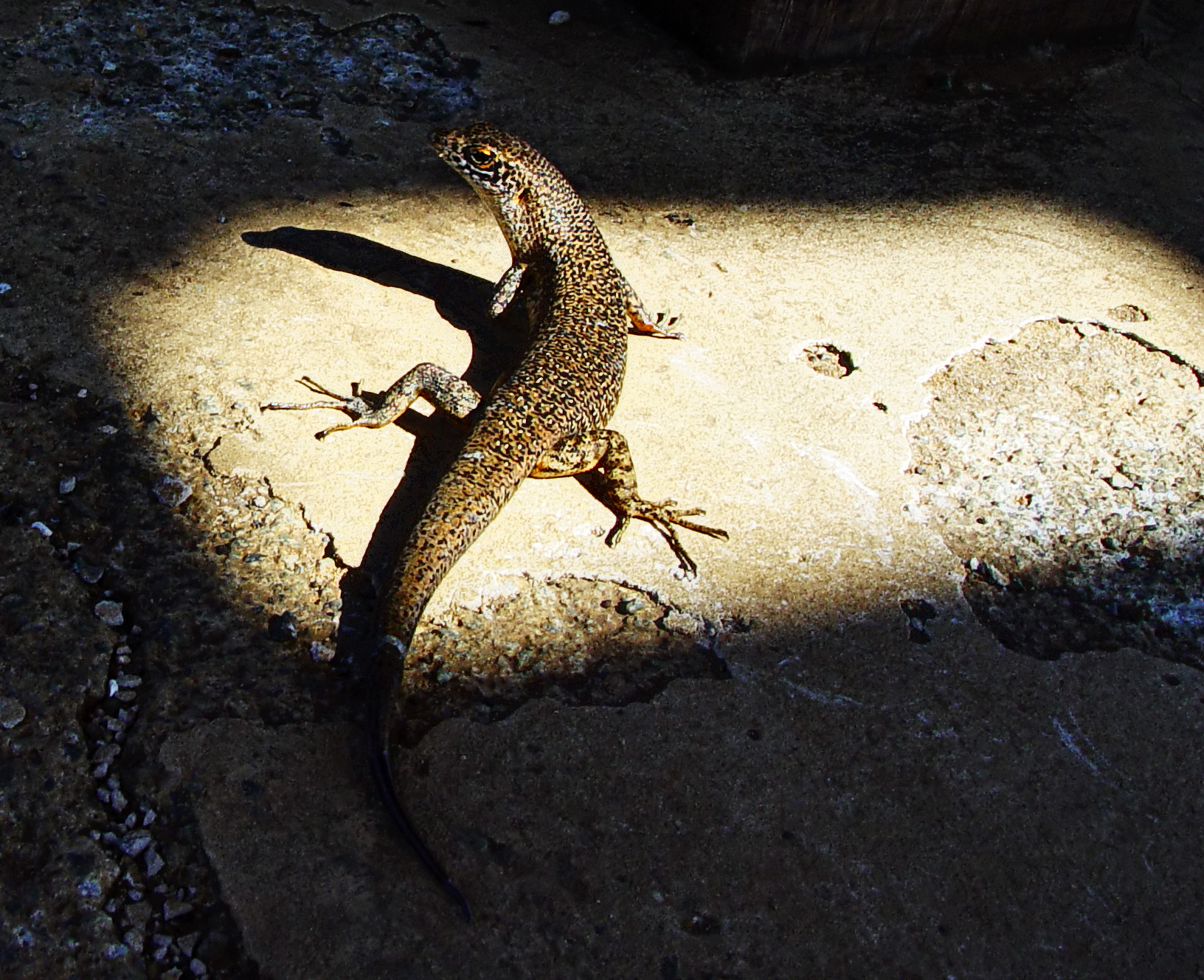
Noronha skinks bask in the sun for thermoregulation.

The Noronha skink is very abundant throughout Fernando de Noronha, even occurring commonly in houses, and also occurs on the smaller islands that surround the main island of the archipelago. Its abundance may be a result of the absence of ecologically similar competitors. Apart from T. atlantica, the reptile fauna of Fernando de Noronha consists of the indigenous amphisbaenian Amphisbaena ridleyi and two introduced lizards, the gecko Hemidactylus mabouia and the tegu Tupinambis merianae.

The species is found in several microhabitats, but most often on rocks. Although predominantly ground-dwelling, it is a good climber. Nothing is known about its reproduction except that skinks studied in late October and early November, during the dry season, showed little evidence of reproductive activity. The Noronha skink is oviparous (egg-laying), like many Trachylepis, but unlike Mabuya, which are all viviparous (giving live birth).

Trachylepis atlantica is active during the day. Its body temperature averages 32 °C (90 °F), a few degrees higher than the environment temperature. During the day, body temperature peaks at up to 38 °C (100 °F) around midday and is lower earlier and later. In the early morning, the lizard may bask in the sun. During foraging, it spends about 28.4% of its time moving on average, a relatively high value for Trachylepis.

A geologist who visited the island in 1876 noted that the skink is curious and bold:

While seated upon the bare rocks I have often observed these little animals watching me, apparently with as much curiosity as I watched them, turning their heads from side to side as if in an effort to be wise. If I kept quiet for a few minutes they would creep up to me and finally upon me; if I moved, they ran down the faces of the rocks, and turning, stuck their heads above the edges to watch me.

=== Diet ===
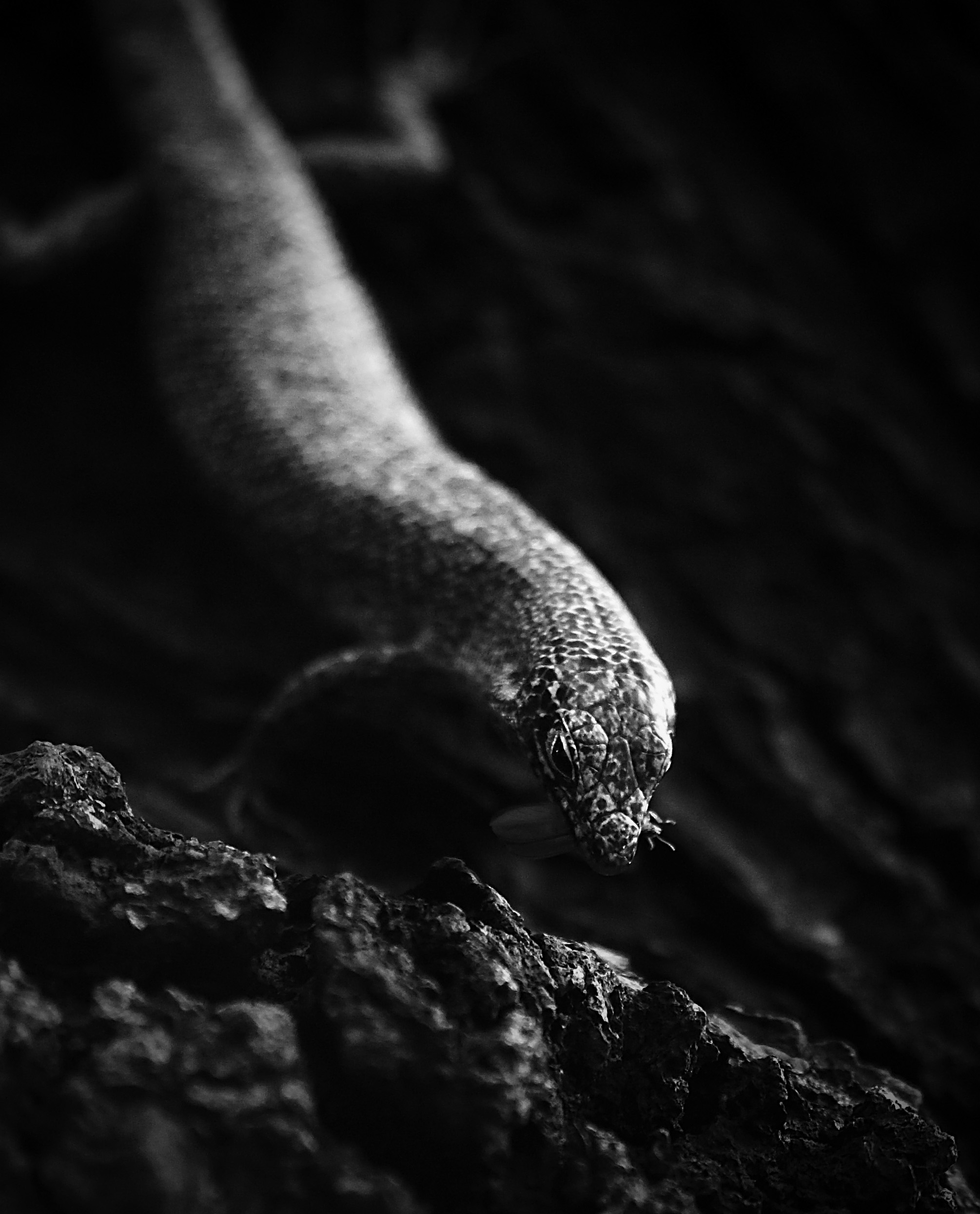
Insects form an important part of the diet of the Noronha skink.

The Noronha skink is an opportunistic omnivore and "thrives on anything edible". Analysis of stomach contents indicates that it mainly eats plant material, at least during the dry period, but it also feeds on insects, including larvae, termites (Isoptera), ants (Formicidae), and beetles (Coleoptera). Its prey is mostly mobile, rather than sedentary, which is consistent with the relatively high proportion of time it spends moving. Related skink species eat mostly insects, but island populations may often be more herbivorous. Animal prey averages 6.9 mm^{3} in volume, less than in most other Trachylepis.

When the mulungu tree Erythrina velutina blooms during the dry season, Noronha skinks climb up to 12 m (39 ft) to reach the inflorescences of the tree and to eat the nectar by inserting their heads into the flowers. They probably use the nectar both for its sugar and water content. In this way, the skinks aid in pollinating the tree, as they acquire pollen on their scales and leave pollen on stigmas when visiting a flower. Pollination is rare behavior among lizards, but occurs most frequently in island species. Humans have introduced additional food sources to the island, including Acacia seeds, feces of the rock cavy (Kerodon rupestris), carrion flies, juvenile Hemidactylus mabouya, and even cookie crumbs given by tourists. The availability of these additional food sources may increase the abundance of the skink. In 1887, H. N. Ridley observed Noronha skinks eating banana skins and yolk from doves' eggs. Several cases of cannibalism have been reported, involving skinks eating eggs, juveniles, and the tail of an adult.

=== Relationships with other species ===
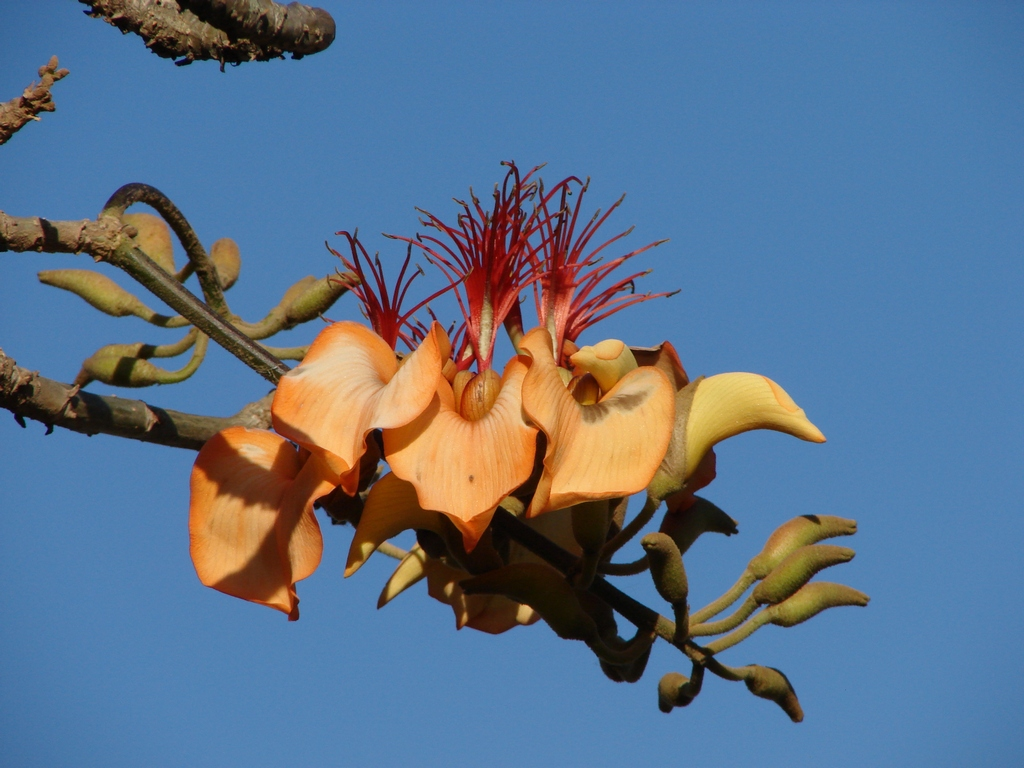
The Noronha skink feeds on nectar from the tree Erythrina velutina.

The Noronha skink probably lacked predators before Fernando de Noronha was discovered by humans, but several species that arrived since do prey on it, most commonly the cat (Felis catus) and cattle egret (Bubulcus ibis). These may negatively affect skink abundance at some localities on the island. The Argentine black and white tegu lizard, Tupinambis merianae, and three introduced rodents, the house mouse (Mus musculus), brown rat (Rattus norvegicus) and black rat (Rattus rattus), have also been observed to eat Noronha skinks, but the rodents, particularly the house mouse, may have been scavenging on already dead skinks.

According to a 2006 study, the Noronha skink is infected by several parasitic worms, most frequently by the nematode Spinicauda spinicauda. Another nematode, Moaciria alvarengai, is much rarer. Other rare parasites include two trematodes—Mesocoelium monas and an undetermined species of Platynossomum—and an undetermined species of Oochoristica, a cestode. S. spinicauda is usually only found in teiid lizards; it may have entered the archipelago when Tupinambis merianae, a teiid, was introduced to the island in 1960. Among nematodes, previous studies in 1956 and 1957 had only reported M. alvarengai and Thelandros alvarengai from the skink; the presence of S. spinicauda could explain the rarity of M. alvarengai and absence of T. alvarengai in Noronha skinks observed in 2006.

== Origin ==
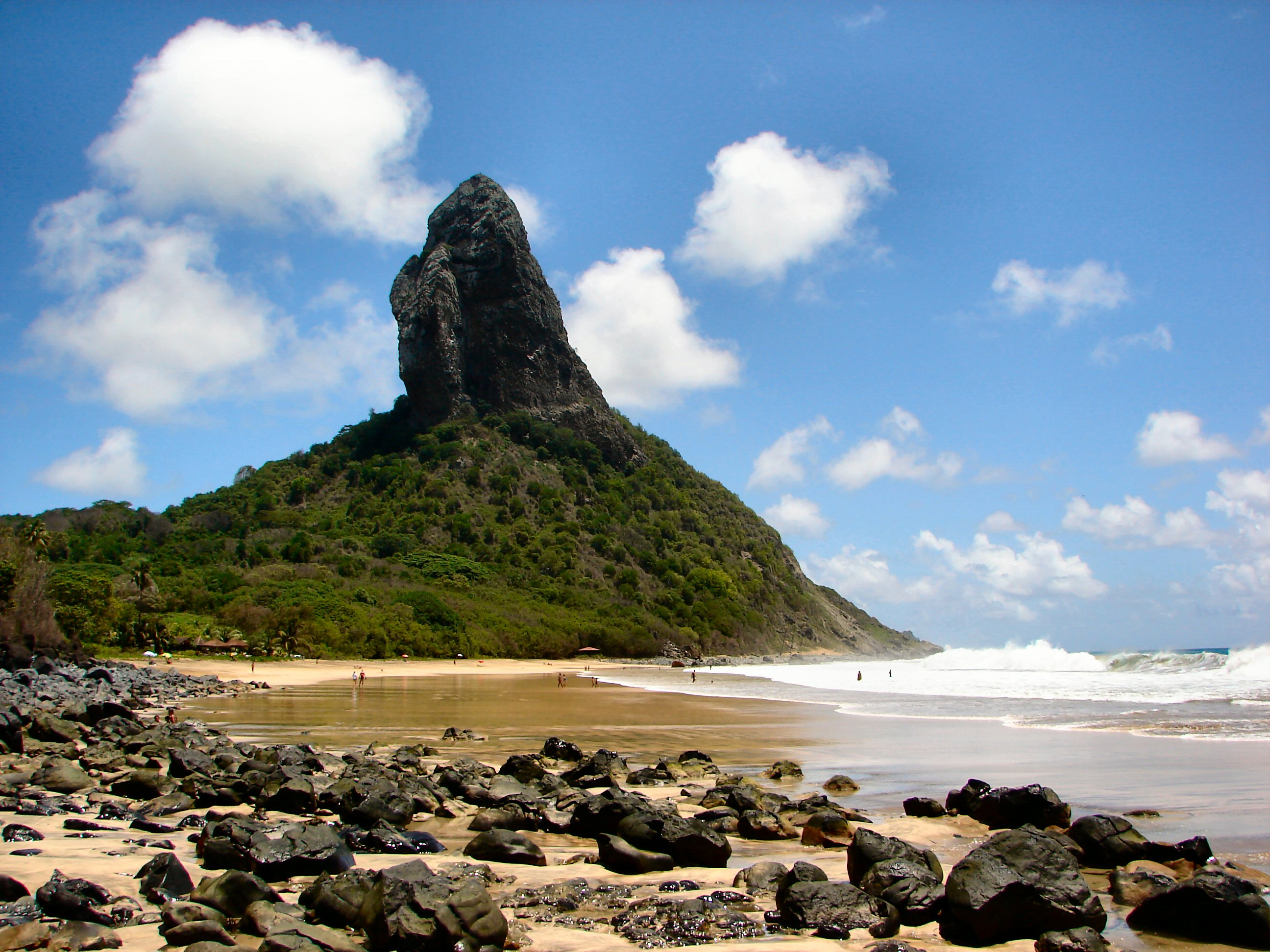
View of Morro do Pico on Fernando de Noronha

Phylogenetic analyses using a variety of mitochondrial and nuclear genes places the Noronha skink among the tropical African species of Trachylepis, a position also supported by morphological similarities. It may have arrived on its island on rafting vegetation from southwestern Africa via the Benguela Current and the South Equatorial Current, which passes Fernando de Noronha. This possibility was first suggested by Alfred Russel Wallace before 1888. Mausfeld and coworkers calculated that the journey from Africa to Fernando de Noronha would take 139 days. Because this period seemed too long for the skink to survive, they proposed that the Noronha skink instead arrived via Ascension Island, where a skink may have persisted into historical times.

The South American and Caribbean Mabuya skinks form a clade that appears to be derived from a separate colonization from Africa. Both transatlantic colonization events are believed to have occurred within the last 9 million years.

== Conservation status ==
The reptile is thought to be stable in terms of population trends and not under any threat of extinction. However, the climate is rapidly changing, so this could change at any point in time. Although environmental changes do not affect the species in particular, the density of the species is at risk of decreasing should the environment change drastically as well as if tourism trends or more invasive animals are introduced. Additionally, the urbanization of surrounding areas to the lizards habitat could be detrimental, therefore International Union for Conservation of Nature evaluated it as least concern.

== Literature cited ==
- Ananjeva, N. B.; Orlov, N. L.; Khalikov, R. G.; Darevsky, I. S.; and Barabanov, A.; 2006. The reptiles of northern Eurasia: taxonomic diversity, distribution, conservation status. Series faunistica 47. Pensoft Publishers, 245 pp. ISBN 978-954-642-269-9
- Avila-Pires, T. C. S.; 1995. Lizards of Brazilian Amazonia (Reptilia: Squamata). Zoologische Verhandelingen 299:1–706
- Bauer, A. M.; 2003. On the identity of Lacerta punctata Linnaeus 1758, the type species of the genus Euprepis Wagler 1830, and the generic assignment of Afro-Malagasy skinks. African Journal of Herpetology 52:1–7
- Boulenger, G. A.; 1887. Catalogue of the Lizards in the British Museum (Natural History). Second edition. Vol. III. Lacertidae, Gerrosauridae, Scincidae, Anelytropidae, Dibamidae, Chamaeleonidae. London: published by order of the Trustees of the British Museum, 575 pp.
- Branner, J. C.; 1888. Notes on the fauna of the islands of Fernando de Noronha (subscription required). American Naturalist 22(262):861–871
- Burt, C. E.; and Burt, M. D.; 1931. South American lizards in the collection of the American Museum of Natural History. Bulletin of the American Museum of Natural History 61:227–395
- Carleton, M. D.; and Olson, S. L.; 1999. Amerigo Vespucci and the rat of Fernando de Noronha: a new genus and species of Rodentia (Muridae, Sigmodontinae) from a volcanic island off Brazil's continental shelf. American Museum Novitates 3256:1–59
- Carranza, S.; and Arnold, N. E.; 2003. Investigating the origin of transoceanic distributions: mtDNA shows Mabuya lizards (Reptilia, Scincidae) crossed the Atlantic twice (subscription required). Systematics and Biodiversity 1(2):275–282
- Dunn, E. R.; 1935. Notes on American Mabuyas (subscription required). Proceedings of the Academy of Natural Sciences of Philadelphia 87:533–557
- Finley, R. B., Jr.; 1945. Notes on lizards from Fernando Noronha (subscription required). Copeia 1945(3):162–164.
- Gasparini, J.L., Peloso, P.L. and Sazima, I. 2007. New opportunities and hazards brought by humans to the island habitat of the skink Euprepis atlanticus. Herpetological Bulletin 100:30–33
- Gray, J. E.; 1839. Catalogue of the slender-tongued saurians, with the description of many new genera and species. Annals and Magazine of Natural History (1)2:287–293
- Gray, J. E.; 1845. Catalogue of the specimens of lizards in the collection of the British Museum. London: published by order of the Trustees of the British Museum, 289 pp.
- Greer, A. E.; Arnold, C.; and Arnold, E. N.; 2000. The systematic significance of the number of presacral vertebrae in the scincid lizard genus Mabuya (subscription required). Amphibia-Reptilia 21:121–126
- Mausfeld, P.; and Vrcibradic, D.; 2002. On the nomenclature of the skink (Mabuya) endemic to the western Atlantic archipelago of Fernando de Noronha, Brazil (subscription required). Journal of Herpetology 36(2):292–295
- Mausfeld, P.; Schmitz, A.; Böhme, W.; Misof, B.; Vrcibradic, D.; and Duarte, C. F.; 2002. Phylogenetic affinities of Mabuya atlantica Schmidt, 1945, endemic to the Atlantic Ocean archipelago of Fernando de Noronha (Brazil): Necessity of partitioning the genus Mabuya Fitzinger, 1826 (Scincidae: Lygosominae) (subscription required). Zoologischer Anzeiger 241:281–293
- Miralles, A.; Chaparro, J. C.; and Harvey, M. B.; 2009. Three rare and enigmatic South American skinks (first page only). Zootaxa 2012:47–68
- O'Shaughnessy, A. M. E.; 1874. Descriptions of new species of Scincidae in the collection of the British Museum. Annals and Magazine of Natural History (4)13:298–301
- Ramalho, A. C. O.; da Silva, R. J.; Schwartz, H. O.; and Péres, A. K., Jr.; 2009. Helminths from an introduced species (Tupinambis merianae), and two endemic species (Trachylepis atlantica and Amphisbaena ridleyi) from Fernando de Noronha archipelago, Brazil. Journal of Parasitology 95(4):1026–1038
- Ridley, H. N.; 1888a. A visit to Fernando do Noronha. The Zoologist (3)12(134):41–49
- Ridley, H. N.; 1888b. Notes on the zoology of Fernando Noronha. Journal of the Linnean Society: Zoology 20:473–570
- Rocha, C. F. D.; Vrcibradic, D.; Menezes, V. A.; and Ariani, C. V.; 2009. Ecology and natural history of the easternmost native lizard species in South America, Trachylepis atlantica (Scincidae), from the Fernando de Noronha archipelago, Brazil (subscription required). Journal of Herpetology 43(3):450–459
- Sazima, I.; Sazima, C.; and Sazima, M.; 2005. Little dragons prefer flowers to maidens: A lizard that laps nectar and pollinates trees. Biota Neotropical 5(1):1–8
- Sazima, I.; Sazima, C.; and Sazima, M.; 2009. A catch-all leguminous tree: Erythrina velutina visited and pollinated by vertebrates at an oceanic island (subscription required). Australian Journal of Botany 57:26–30
- Schleich, H.-H.; Kästle, W.; and Kabisch, K.; 1996. Amphibians and reptiles of North Africa: biology, systematics, field guide. Koeltz Scientific Books, 630 pp. ISBN 978-3-87429-377-8
- Schmidt, K. P.; 1945. A new name for a Brazilian Mabuya. Copeia 1945(1):45
- Silva, J. M., Jr.; Péres, A. K., Jr.; and Sazima, I.; 2005. Euprepis atlanticus (Noronha Skink). Predation. Herpetological Review 36:62–63
- Travassos, H.; 1946. Estudo da variação de Mabuya punctata (Gray, 1839). Boletim do Museu Nacional (Zoologia) 60:1–56 (in Portuguese)
- Travassos, H.; 1948. Nota sobre a "Mabuya" da Ilha Fernando de Noronha (Squamata, Scincidae). Revista Brasileira de Biologia 8:201–208 (in Portuguese)
- Whiting, A. S.; Sites, J. W.; Pellegrino, K. C. M.; and Rodrigues, M. T.; 2006. Comparing alignment methods for inferring the history of the new world lizard genus Mabuya (Squamata: Scincidae) (subscription required). Molecular Phylogenetics and Evolution 38:719–730
