= Oochoristica leonregagnonae =

Scientific classification
- Kingdom: Animalia
- Phylum: Platyhelminthes
- Class: Cestoda
- Order: Cyclophyllidea
- Family: Linstowiidae
- Genus: Oochoristica
- Species: O. leonregagnonae

Binomial name
- Oochoristica leonregagnonae Arizmendi-Espinosa, García-Prieto & Guillén-Hernández, 2005

Species of flatworm

Oochoristica leonregagnonae is a species of cestodes found in the iguana Ctenosaura pectinata.

== Description ==
It has a large number of testes (78–112), and numerous ovarian lobes (31–79). Its testes are limited to the central region between the excretory canals.
