= Amphisbaena ridleyi =

Conservation status
- Least Concern (IUCN 3.1)

Scientific classification
- Kingdom: Animalia
- Phylum: Chordata
- Class: Reptilia
- Order: Squamata
- Clade: Amphisbaenia
- Family: Amphisbaenidae
- Genus: Amphisbaena
- Species: A. ridleyi

Binomial name
- Amphisbaena ridleyi Boulenger, 1890
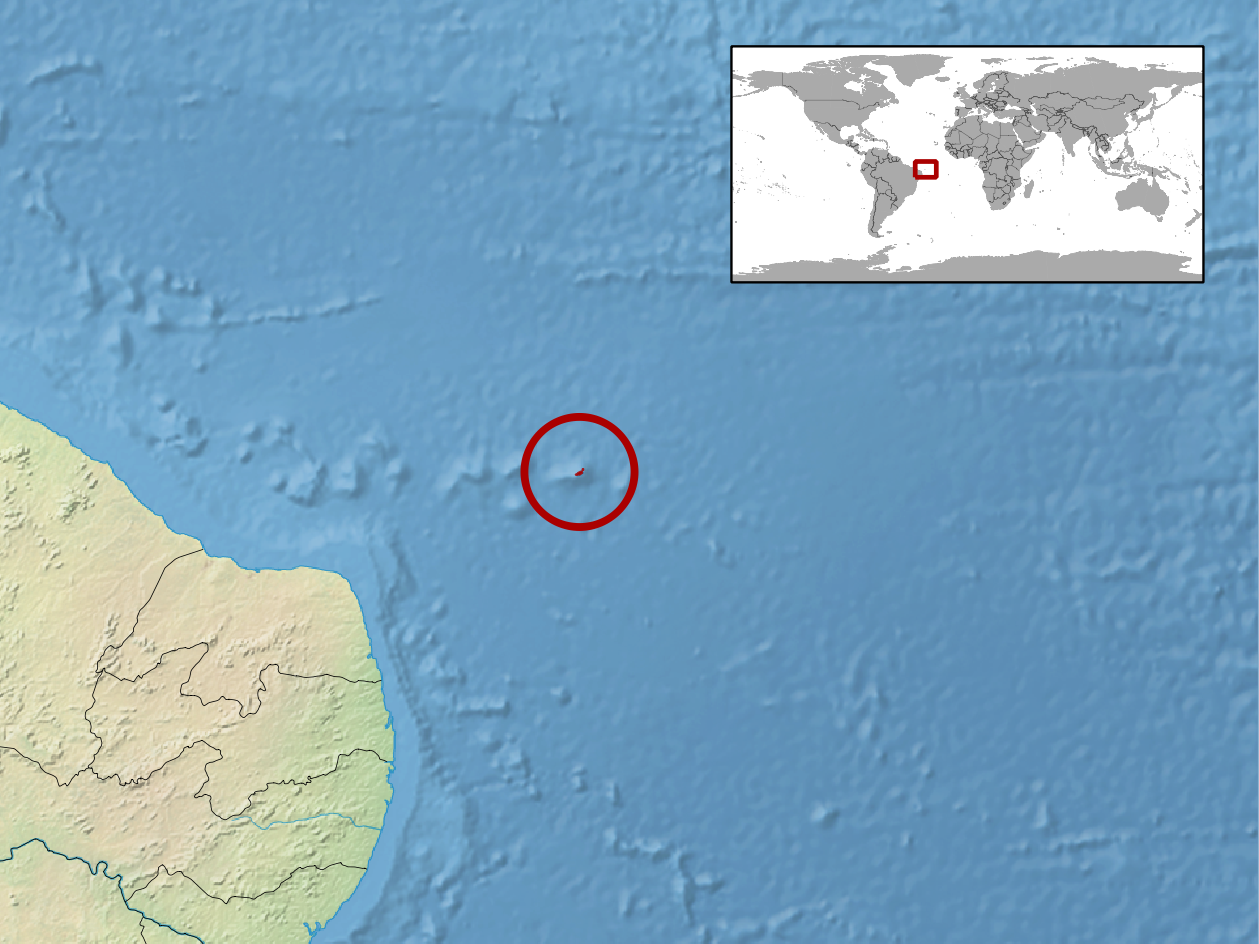

Species of lizard

Amphisbaena ridleyi, known by the common names Ridley's worm lizard or the Noronha worm lizard, is a species of amphisbaenian in the family Amphisbaenidae. The species is endemic to the island of Fernando de Noronha off the coast of Brazil. It is one of two indigenous reptiles on the island.

== Taxonomy ==
Italian explorer Amerigo Vespucci may have visited Fernando de Noronha in 1503. In an account of his voyage, the authenticity of which is doubtful, he records "some snakes" from the island. Although Amphisbaena ridleyi is not a snake, the difference would be clear only to a herpetologist, and it is likely that Vespucci's men actually saw A. ridleyi. He also recorded "lizards with two tails" and "very big rats", which can be identified with Trachylepis atlantica and Noronhomys vespuccii.

In 1887, botanist Henry Nicholas Ridley collected 16 specimens on Fernando de Noronha, which were deposited in the British Museum of Natural History, and in 1890, George Albert Boulenger officially described it as Amphisbaena ridleyi, naming it after Ridley. The generic name Amphisbaena is a compound of two Greek words: αμφις (amphis), meaning "both ways", and βαινειν (bainein), meaning "to go". This is in reference to the appearance of having a head on either end of its body, meaning the animal can "go either way". In 1945, a Lt. Finley acquired five individuals and in 1973, ornithologist Storrs L. Olson collected 12 additional examples, which are now in the United States National Museum.

== Distribution ==
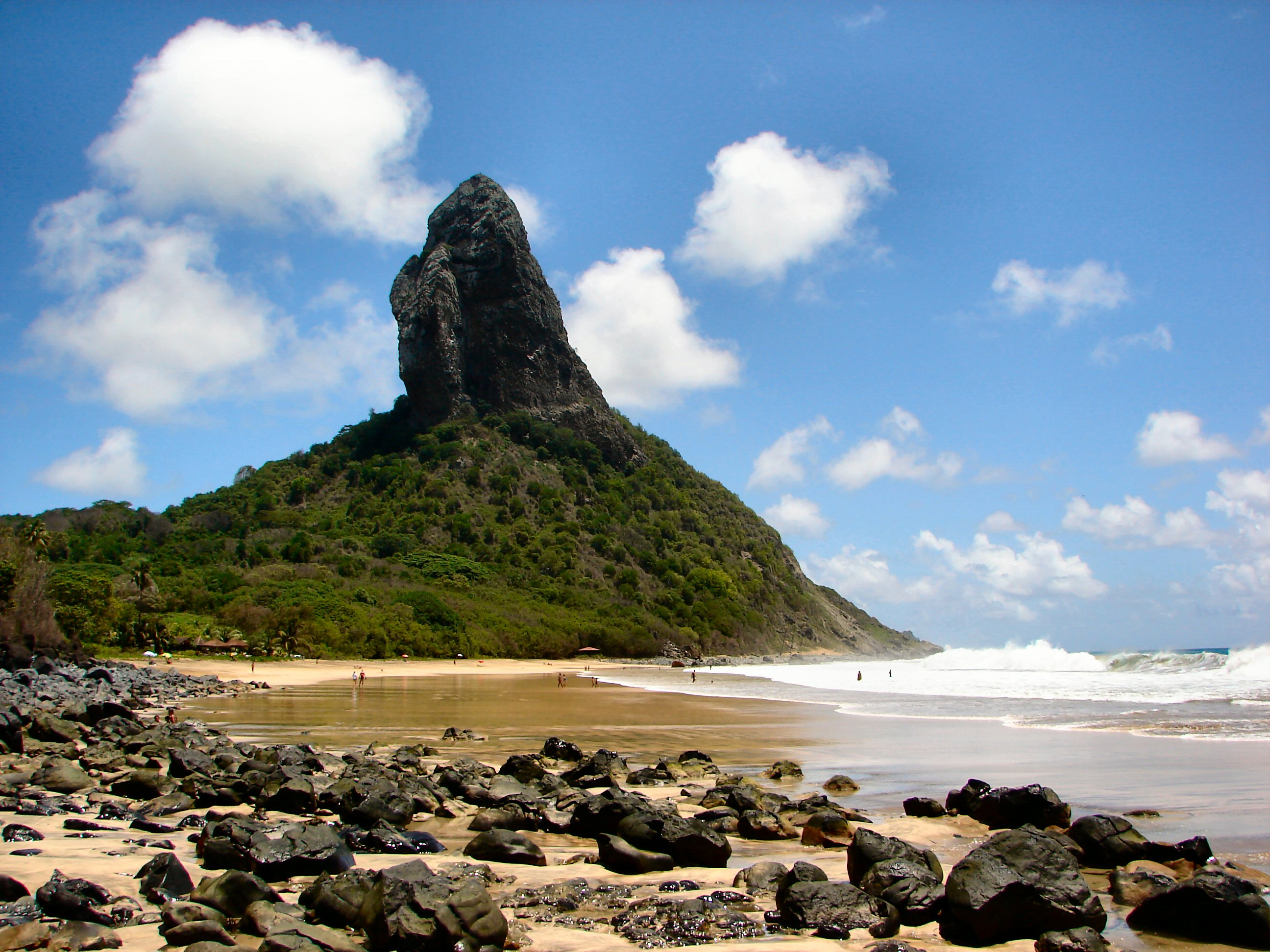
Morro de Pico

A. ridleyi is found on the island of Fernando de Noronha, a small volcanic archipelago in the equatorial South Atlantic 345 km off the northeastern Brazilian coast. It is common in suitable habitat; Olson reported that it could easily be found in forests by turning over stones. Malathronas mentions that it can be seen basking in the sun on Morro de Pico.

== Description ==
Despite a superficial resemblance to primitive snakes, amphisbaenians such as Amphisbaena ridleyi have features which distinguish them from other reptiles. Internally, the right lung is reduced in size to fit the narrow body, whereas in snakes, it is the left lung that is reduced in size. The typical length for this species is 250 millimetres (9.8 in).

Amphisbaena ridleyi has a stout head with a broad snout, not set off from the neck. Most of the skull is solid bone, and it has a distinctive single median tooth in the upper jaw. It has no outer ears, and the eyes are deeply recessed and covered with skin and scales. The body is elongated, and the tail truncates in a manner that vaguely resembles the head. It lacks legs but has remnants of the pelvic and pectoral girdles embedded within its body musculature. The tail is only loosely attached to the body. A. ridleyi moves using an accordion-like motion, in which the skin moves and the body seemingly just drags along behind it. It is also able to effectively perform this locomotion in reverse.

== Diet ==
Amphisbaena ridleyi is carnivorous, and has blunt, interlocking, teeth, meant for crushing its prey, primarily snails (Hyperaulax ridleyi), but its diet includes other invertebrates. It is the only amphisbaenian known to have specializations for eating hard food such as snails. In periods of drought Amphisbaena ridleyi climbs the trunks of Mulungu trees to obtain nectar from the flowers.

== Reproduction ==
A. ridleyi is oviparous.

== See also ==
- List of reptiles of Brazil
