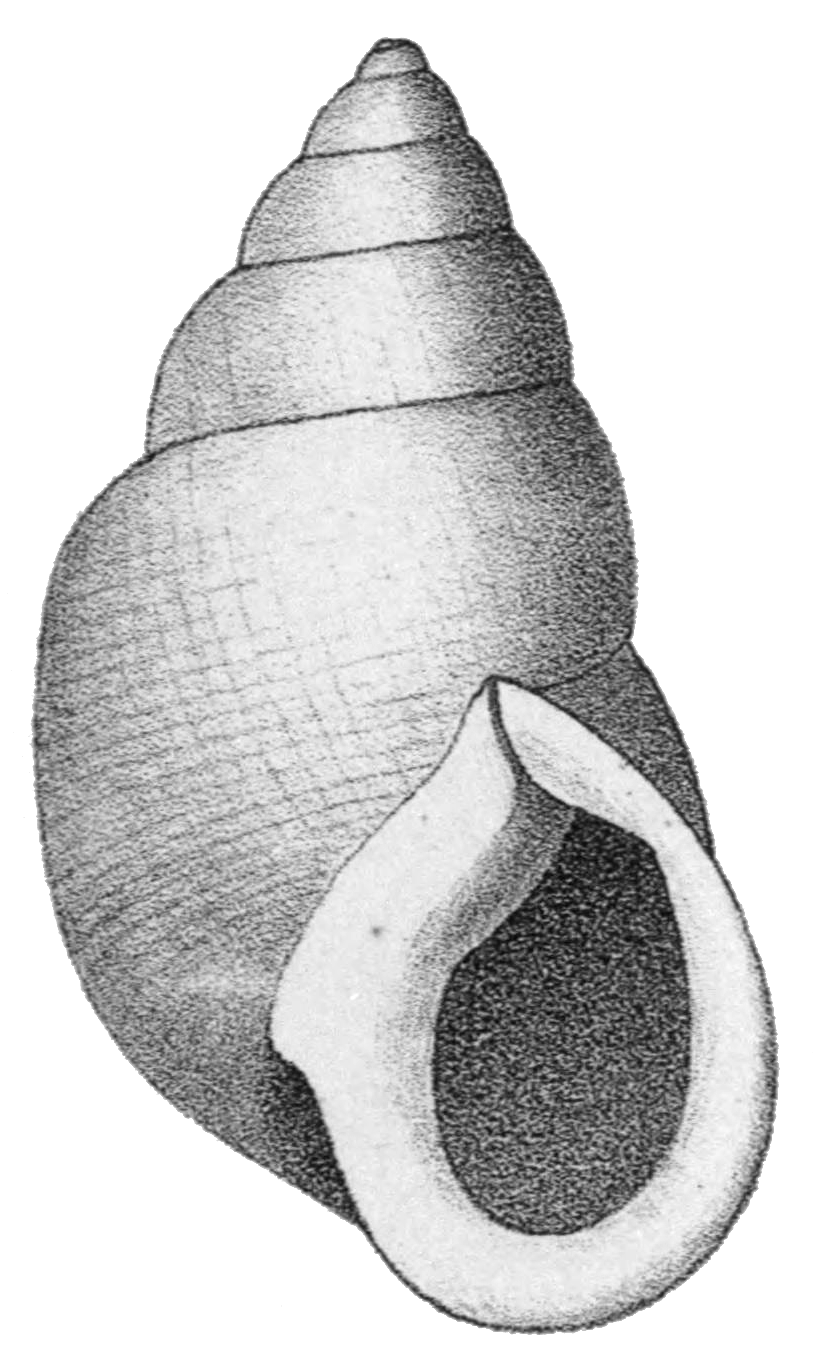
- Drawing of the apertural view of a shell of Hyperaulax ridleyi.

Scientific classification
- Kingdom: Animalia
- Phylum: Mollusca
- Class: Gastropoda
- Order: Stylommatophora
- Suborder: Helicina
- Superfamily: Orthalicoidea
- Family: Odontostomidae
- Genus: Hyperaulax; Pilsbry, 1897

Type species
- Bulimus ridleyi E. A. Smith, 1890

Synonyms
- Bonnanius Jousseaume, 1900 (junior synonym); Bulimulus (Hyperaulax) Pilsbry, 1897 (original rank)

= Hyperaulax =

Genus of gastropods

Hyperaulax is a genus of tropical air-breathing land snails, terrestrial pulmonate gastropod mollusks in the family Tomogeridae.

== Species ==
Species within the genus Hyperaulax include:

- Hyperaulax ramagei (E. A. Smith, 1890)
- Hyperaulax ridleyi (E. A. Smith, 1890) - type species

Species brought into synonymy

- † Hyperaulax americanus (Heilprin, 1886): synonym of † Tocobaga americanus (Heilprin, 1886)
- † Hyperaulax ballistae (Dall, 1915): synonym of † Tocobaga floridanus (Conrad, 1846)
- † Hyperaulax floridanus (Conrad, 1846): synonym of †Tocobaga floridanus (Conrad, 1846)
- † Hyperaulax heilprinianus (Dall, 1890): synonym of † Tocobaga floridanus (Conrad, 1846)
- † Hyperaulax limnaeiformis (Meek & Hayden, 1856): synonym of †Lioplacodes limneaformis (Meek & Hayden, 1856) (incorrect subsequent spelling; new combination)
- † Hyperaulax remolinus (Dall, 1915): synonym of † Tocobaga floridanus (Conrad, 1846) (junior synonym)
- † Hyperaulax stearnsii (Dall, 1890): synonym of † Tocobaga floridanus (Conrad, 1846) (junior synonym)
- † Hyperaulax tampae (Dall, 1915): synonym of †Tocobaga floridanus (Conrad, 1846) (junior synonym)
- † Hyperaulax tortilla (Dall, 1890): synonym of † Tocobaga floridanus (Conrad, 1846) (junior synonym)
