= Euprepis =

Scientific classification (obsolete)
- Kingdom: Animalia
- Phylum: Chordata
- Class: Reptilia
- Order: Squamata
- Suborder: Scinciformata
- Infraorder: Scincomorpha
- Family: Scincidae
- Subfamily: Lygosominae
- Genus: Euprepis; Wagler, 1830

Type species
- Scincus agilis Raddi, 1823 (Note: Not Lacerta punctata Linnaeus, 1758, as incorrectly listed by Mausfeld and others in 2002.)

Synonyms
- Euprepes Wiegmann, 1834 (Note: Incorrect subsequent spelling of Euprepes Wagler.)

Genus of lizards

Euprepis is an obsolete genus of skinks in the subfamily Lygosominae. It was named by Wagler in 1830 and frequently used in subsequent years, often misspelled as Euprepes, a misspelling introduced by Wiegmann in 1834. It was then subsumed under the large skink genus Mabuya, until Mausfeld and others resurrected it for a group of mainly African skinks they split from Mabuya. The following year, Bauer argued that this assignment had been in error and that this group should be called Trachylepis instead. Euprepis itself is a junior synonym of Mabuya.

== Type species ==
The identity of the type species, the name-bearing type which determines the application of a generic name, of Euprepis has been in some recent dispute. In 1830, Wagler included several species in Euprepis: Lacerta punctata Linnaeus, 1758 (=Lygosoma punctatum), Scincus multifasciatus Kuhl, 1820, Scincus trilineatus Schneider, 1801, Scincus quinquetaeniatus Lichtenstein, 1823, Scincus agilis Raddi, 1823 (=Mabuya agilis), Lacerta fasciata Linnaeus, 1758, Lacerta quinquelineata Linnaeus, 1758, Scincus tristatus Daudin, 1802, and Scincus Sloanei Daudin, 1802, but he did not select a type species. Subsequently, Fitzinger selected "Eumeces mabouia" (=Mabuya mabouya) as the type species, but his designation is invalid because Wagler did not include this species in his original concept of the genus. In 1957, Loveridge selected Scincus agilis (=Mabuya agilis) as the type species from among the species Wagler had included as the type species, and in 1970 Peters and Donoso-Barros listed, without comment, Lacerta punctata Linnaeus (=Lygosoma punctatum) as the type species. When Mausfeld and others split Mabuya in 2002, they resurrected Euprepis for the group including African and Malagasy species and the Noronha skink and also listed Lacerta punctata as the type species, considering all previous type designations invalid. In 2003, Bauer argued that the earliest type species designation is valid, so the type species of Euprepis is Scincus agilis, a member of Mabuya as restricted by Mausfeld and others in 2002 (including only American species), making Euprepis a junior synonym of Mabuya. Bauer also argued that Lacerta punctata did not apply to a species of the African Mabuya group, as Mausfeld and others had assumed, but rather to the Asian species Lygosoma punctatum.

== Species ==
Among the species previously included in Euprepis or Euprepes are the following:

- Euprepis atlanticus: Mausfeld et al., 2002 – currently Trachylepis atlantica
- Euprepes chaperi Vaillant, 1884 – currently Lygosoma sundevalli
- Euprepis punctatus: Gray, 1845 – currently Trachylepis atlantica

== Literature cited ==
- Bauer, A.M. 2003. On the identity of Lacerta punctata Linnaeus 1758, the type species of the genus Euprepis Wagler 1830, and the generic assignment of Afro-Malagasy skinks. African Journal of Herpetology 52:1–7.
- Boulenger, G.A. 1887. Catalogue of the Lizards in the British Museum (Natural History). Second edition. Vol. III. Lacertidae, Gerrosauridae, Scincidae, Anelytropidae, Dibamidae, Chamaeleonidae. London: published by order of the Trustees of the British Museum, 575 pp.
- Gray, J.E. 1845. Catalogue of the specimens of lizards in the collection of the British Museum. London: published by order of the Trustees of the British Museum, 289 pp.
- Mausfeld, Patrick; Schmitz, Andreas; Böhme, Wolfgang; Misof, Bernhard; Vrcibradic, Davor; Rocha, Carlos Frederico Duarte (2002). "Phylogenetic affinities of Mabuya atlantica Schmidt, 1945, endemic to the Atlantic Ocean archipelago of Fernando de Noronha (Brazil): Necessity of partitioning the genus Mabuya Fitzinger, 1826 (Scincidae: Lygosominae)". Zoologischer Anzeiger - A Journal of Comparative Zoology. 241 (3): 281–293. doi:10.1078/0044-5231-00081.
