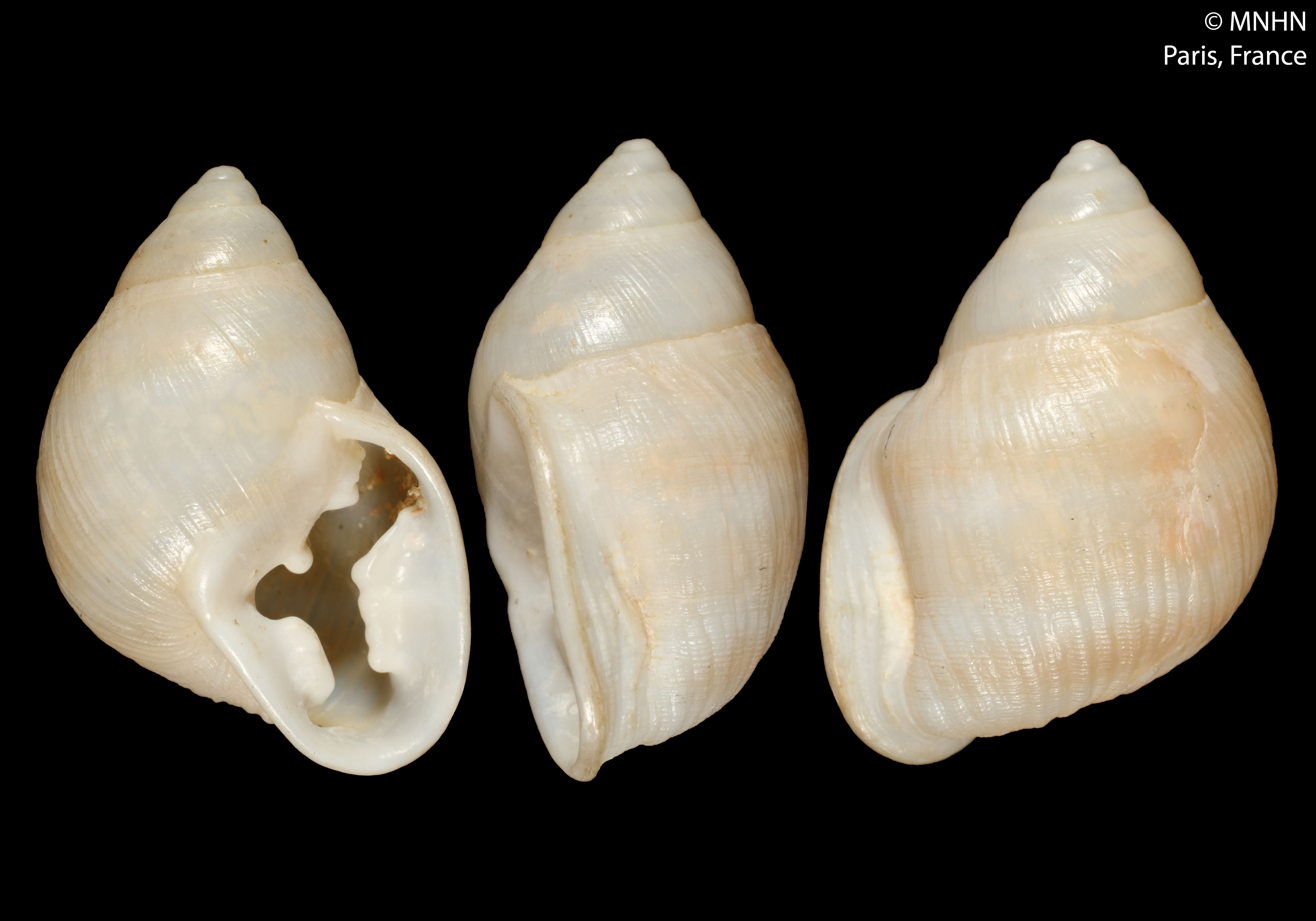
- Shell of Hyperaulax ramagei (syntype at MNHN, Paris)

Scientific classification
- Kingdom: Animalia
- Phylum: Mollusca
- Class: Gastropoda
- Order: Stylommatophora
- Family: Tomogeridae
- Genus: Hyperaulax
- Species: H. ramagei

Binomial name
- Hyperaulax ramagei (E. A. Smith, 1890)

Synonyms
- Bonnanius bouvieri Jousseaume, 1900 (junior synonym); Bonnanius ramagei (E.A. Smith, 1890) (superseded combination); Bulimus ramagei E. A. Smith, 1890 (original combination)

= Hyperaulax ramagei =

Species of gastropod

Hyperaulax ramagei is a species of tropical air-breathing land snail, a terrestrial pulmonate gastropod mollusk in the family Tomogeridae.

== Distribution ==
This terrestrial species is found on the islands Fernando de Noronha off Brazil.
