= Oochoristica =

Scientific classification
- Kingdom: Animalia
- Phylum: Platyhelminthes
- Class: Cestoda
- Order: Cyclophyllidea
- Family: Linstowiidae
- Genus: Oochoristica; Lühe, 1898

Type species
- Taenia tuberculata Rudolphi, 1819

Species
- See text

Synonyms
- Diochetos Harwood, 1932; Skrjabinochara Spasskii, 1948; Megacapsula Wahid, 1961; Sharpilia Spasskii, 1988; Semenochetos Palladwar & Kalyankar, 1989

Genus of flatworms

Oochoristica is a genus of tapeworms.

== Species ==
- Oochoristica acapulcoensis Brooks, Pérez-Ponce de León & García-Prieto, 1999
- Oochoristica aizawlensis Banerjee, Manna & Sanyal, 2016
- Oochoristica ameivae (Beddard, 1914)
- Oochoristica americana Harwood, 1932
- Oochoristica anniellae Stunkard & Lynch, 1944
- Oochoristica anolis Harwood, 1932
- Oochoristica aulicus Johri, 1961
- Oochorsitica australiensis Spasskii, 1951
- Oochoristica bailea Singal, 1961
- Oochorsitica beveridgei Masova et al., 2010
- Oochoristica bezyi Bursey & Goldberg, 1992
- Oochoristica bivitellobata Loewen, 1940
- Oochoristica bivitellobatoides Bursey & Goldberg, 2011
- Oochoristica brachysoma Dupouy & Kechemir, 1973
- Oochoristica bresslaui Fuhrmann, 1927
- Oochoristica calotes Nama & Khichi, 1974
- Oochoristica celebensis Yamaguti, 1954
- Oochoristica chabaudi Dollfus, 1954
- Oochoristica chalcidesi Schuster, 2011
- Oochoristica chavenoni Capron, Brygoo, & Broussert, 1962
- Oochoristica chinensis Jensen, Schmidt & Kuntz, 1983
- Oochoristica courduieri Capron, Brygoo, & Broussert, 1962
- Oochoristica crassiceps Baylis, 1920
- Oochoristica crotalicola Alexander & Alexander, 1957
- Oochoristica crotaphyti McAllister & Trauth, 1985
- Oochoristica cryptobothrium Linstow, 1906
- Oochoristica danielae Capron, Brygoo, & Broussert, 1962
- Oochoristica darensis Dollfus, 1957
- Oochoristica elaphis Harwood, 1932
- Oochoristica elongata Dupouy & Kechemir, 1973
- Oochoristica eremophila Beveridge, 1977
- Oochoristica eumecis Harwood, 1932
- Oochoristica feliui Foronda, Nbreu-Acosta, Casanova, Ribas & Valladares, 2009
- Oochoristica freitasi Rêgo & Ibáñez, 1965
- Oochoristica gallica Dollfus, 1954
- Oochoristica gracewileyae Loewen, 1940
- Oochoristica guanacastensis Brooks, Pérez-Ponce de León & García-Prieto, 1999
- Oochoristica gymnophthalmicola Bursey, Goldberg & Telford, 2007
- Oochoristica hainanensis Hsu, 1935
- Oochoristica harschi McAllister & Bursey, 2017
- Oochoristica hemidactyli Johri, 1955
- Oochoristica iguanae Bursey & Goldberg, 1996
- Oochoristica indica Misra, 1945
- Oochoristica insulamargaritae López-Neyra & Diaz-Ungría, 1957
- Oochoristica islandensis Bursey & Goldberg, 1992
- Oochoristica japonensis Kugi, 1993
- Oochoristica javaensis Kennedy, Killick, & Beverley-Burton, 1982
- Oochoristica jodhpurensis Nama, 1987
- Oochoristica jonnesi Bursey, McAllister & Freed, 1997
- Oochoristica junkea Johri, 1950
- Oochoristica khalili Hamid, 1932
- Oochoristica koubeki Mašová, Tenora & Baruš, 2012
- Oochoristica langrangei Joyeux & Houdemer, 1927
- Oochoristica leiperi (Wahid, 1961)
- Oochoristica leonregagnonae Arizmendi-Espinosa, García-Prieto & Guillén-Hernández, 2005
- Oochoristica lizardi Misra, Capoor & Singh, 1989
- Oochoristica longicirrata Dupouy & Kechemir, 1973
- Oochoristica lygosomae Burt, 1933
- Oochoristica lygosomatis Skinker, 1935
- Oochoristica macallisteri Bursey & Goldberg, 1996
- Oochoristica maccoyi Bursey & Goldberg, 1996
- Oochoristica mandapamensis Johri, 1958
- Oochoristica microscolex Della Santa, 1956
- Oochoristica najdei Magzoub et al., 1980
- Oochoristica natricis Harwood, 1932
- Oochoristica noronhae Bursey, Rocha, Menezes, Ariani & Vrcibradic, 2010
- Oochoristica novaezealandae Schmidt & Allison, 1985
- Oochoristica nupta Kugi & Mohammad, 1988
- Oochoristica okinawensis Kugi, 1993
- Oochoristica ophia Capoor, Srivastava, & Chahuan, 1974
- Oochoristica osheroffi Meggitt, 1934
- Oochoristica parvogenitalis Dupouy & Kechemir, 1973
- Oochoristica parvovaria Steelman, 1939
- Oochoristica parvula (Stunkard, 1938)
- Oochoristica pauriensis Malhotra & Capoor, 1984
- Oochoristica phrynocephali Schuster, 2012
- Oochoristica phrynosomatis (Harwood, 1932)
- Oochoristica piankai Bursey & Woolery, 1996
- Oochoristica pleionorches Dollfus, 1954
- Oochoristica pseudocotylea Dollfus, 1957
- Oochoristica rostellata Zschokke, 1905
- Oochoristica salensis Dollfus, 1954
- Oochoristica scelopori Voge & Fox, 1950
- Oochoristica sindensis Farooq et al.,1983
- Oochoristica sobolevi Spasskii, 1948
- Oochoristica tandani Singh, 1957
- Oochoristica thapari Johri, 1934
- Oochoristica theileri Fuhrmann, 1924
- Oochoristica trachysauri (Mac Callum, 1921)
- Oochoristica travassosi Rêgo & Ibáñez, 1965
- Oochoristica truncata (Krabbe, 1879)
- Oochoristica tuberculata (Rudolphi, 1819)
- Oochoristica ubelakeri Bursey et al., 1994
- Oochoristica vacuolata Hickman, 1954
- Oochoristica vanzolinii Rêgo & Oliveira-Rodrigues, 1965
- Oochoristica varani Nama & Khichi, 1972
- Oochoristica whitentoni Steelman, 1939
- Oochoristica whitfieldi Guillén-Hernández, García-Prieto & Arizmendi-Espinosa, 2007
- Oochoristica zonuri Baylis, 1919
