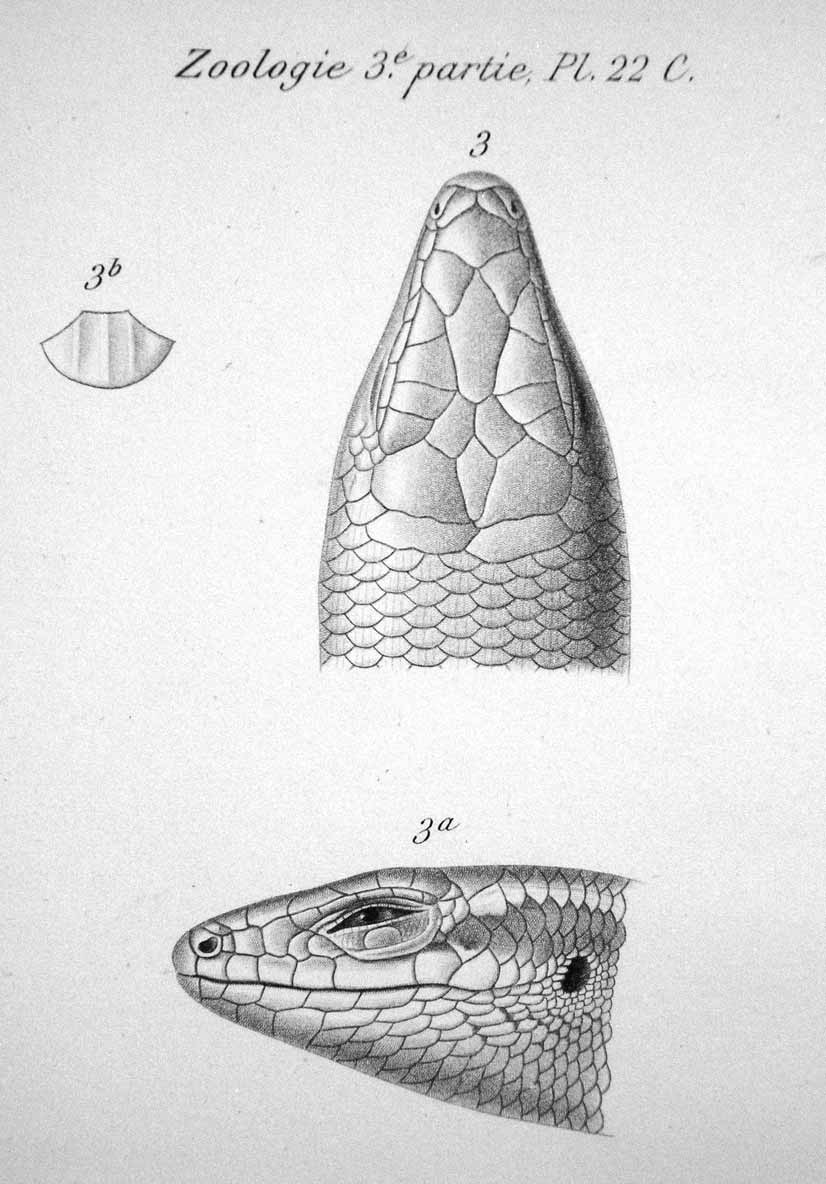

Scientific classification
- Domain: Eukaryota
- Kingdom: Animalia
- Phylum: Chordata
- Class: Reptilia
- Order: Squamata
- Family: Scincidae
- Genus: Trachylepis
- Species: T. maculata

Binomial name
- Trachylepis maculata (Gray, 1839)

Synonyms
- Tiliqua maculata Gray, 1839; Mabuya maculata: Anderson, 1900; Trachylepis maculata: Miralles et al., 2009

= Trachylepis maculata =

Species of lizard

Trachylepis maculata, the spotted mabuya, is a species of skink in the genus Trachylepis recorded from Demerara in Guyana, northern South America. It is placed in the genus Trachylepis, which is otherwise mostly restricted to Africa, and its type locality may be in error. It is an unstriped, olive-brown, grayish animal, with dark spots all over the body. Its taxonomic history is complex due to confusion with Trachylepis atlantica from the Atlantic Ocean island of Fernando de Noronha and doubts regarding its type locality.

== Taxonomy ==
T. maculata was first described, as Tiliqua maculata, by Gray in 1839 on the basis of three specimens said to be from Demerara, Guyana. On the same page, Gray described Tiliqua punctata from the island of Fernando de Noronha off Brazil. In 1887, the two names were considered by Boulenger to pertain to the same species, which was initially named Mabuya punctata but renamed Mabuya maculata by Anderson in 1900, because the latter name was preoccupied by an older name. In 1935, Dunn disputed that the two were identical, reinstated Mabuya punctata as the name for the Noronha species, apparently unaware that the name is preoccupied, and considered maculata to be the same as Mabuya mabouya. In 1946, Travassos again synonymized the two, naming the Noronha skink as Mabuya maculata. In the early 2000s, the matter was revisited by Mausfeld and Vrcibradic, who examined the type specimens of punctata and maculata. They noted that punctata differs from maculata in having five instead of three keels on the dorsal scales; generally fewer scales; parietal scales separated, not in contact as in punctata; and fewer subdigital lamellae below the fourth finger and toe. Consequently, they regarded the two as representing distinct species and recommended that the Fernando de Noronha species be named Mabuya atlantica and the Guyana one Mabuya maculata. In 2002, it was realized that the genus Mabuya was not a natural grouping and a mainly African group of species which also includes the Fernando de Noronha skink was transferred to a separate genus, first named Euprepis and later Trachylepis. Since then, this species has been known as Trachylepis atlantica. In 2009, Miralles and coworkers again considered the taxonomy of maculata, referring it to Trachylepis instead of Mabuya because the third supraocular and frontal are in contact, as in other species of Trachylepis. It also has auricular lobules and heavy keels on the dorsal scales. They were the first to use the current name combination, Trachylepis maculata.

The origin and nature of T. maculata are still unclear. The collection from Demerara which included T. maculata included various species that have not been found in Guyana again, including some restricted to Caribbean islands or to other parts of South America. Consequently, Mausfeld and Vrcibradic suggested that T. maculata may be the same as similarly colored Caribbean Mabuya species or the Venezuelan Mabuya falconensis, but these differ from T. maculata in a number of characters, indicating their membership in Mabuya instead of Trachylepis. T. maculata may in fact have come from Guyana, perhaps inadvertently introduced into Guyana from Africa, and subsequently become extinct; alternatively, the three known specimens may have been collected in Africa. Among African Trachylepis, Trachylepis perrotettii is regarded as most similar to T. maculata.

== Literature cited ==
- Miralles, A., Chaparro, J.C. and Harvey, M.B. 2009. Three rare and enigmatic South American skinks. Zootaxa 2012:47–68.
- Mausfeld, P. and Vrcibradic, D. 2002. On the nomenclature of the skink (Mabuya) endemic to the western Atlantic archipelago of Fernando de Noronha, Brazil. Journal of Herpetology 36(2):292–295.
