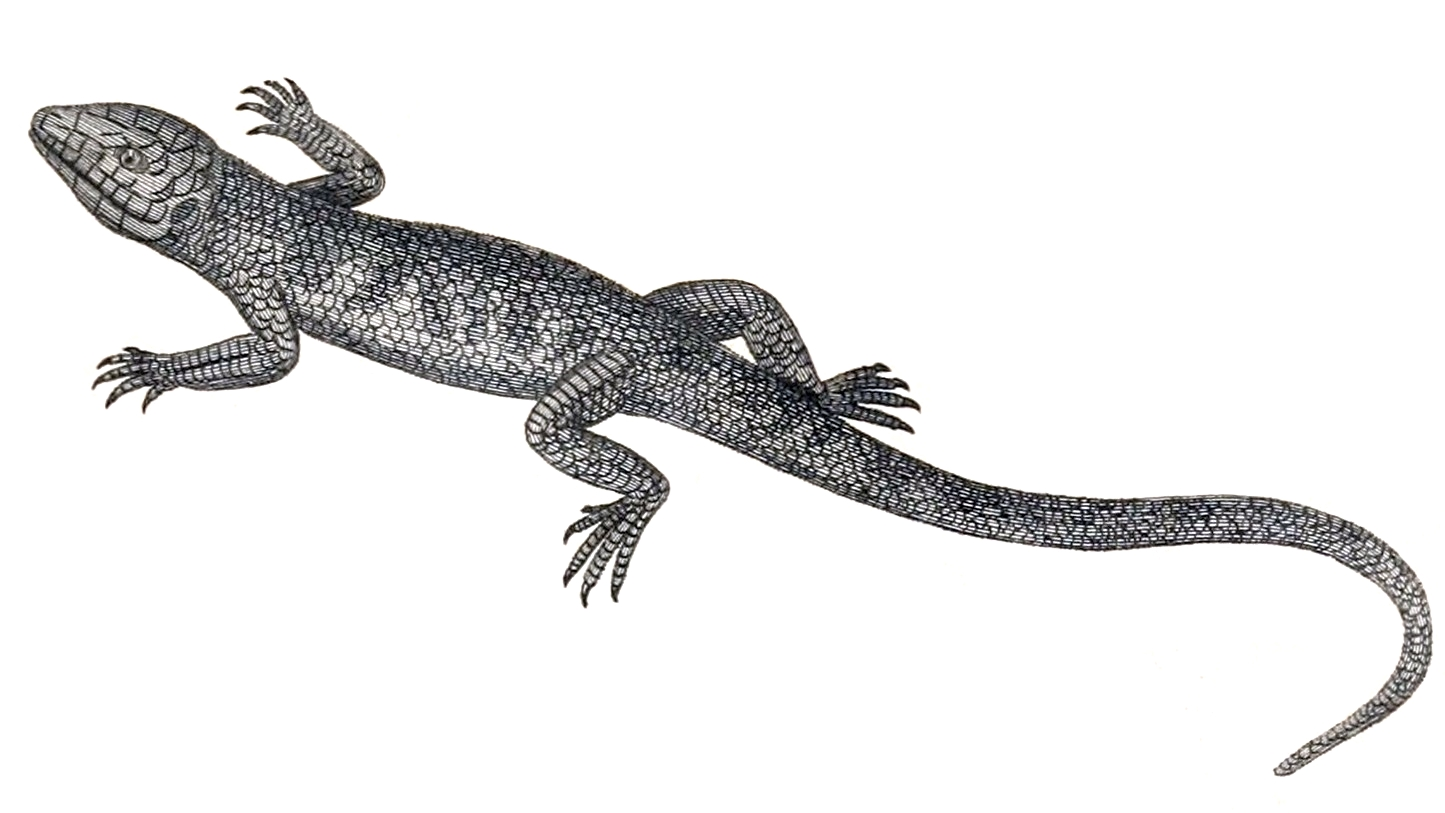

Conservation status
- Critically endangered, possibly extinct (IUCN 3.1)

Scientific classification
- Kingdom: Animalia
- Phylum: Chordata
- Class: Reptilia
- Order: Squamata
- Suborder: Scinciformata
- Infraorder: Scincomorpha
- Family: Mabuyidae
- Genus: Mabuya
- Species: M. mabouya

Binomial name
- Mabuya mabouya (Bonnaterre, 1789)

Synonyms
- Lacertus mabouya Lacerta mabouya Scincus mabouya Mabuya dominicensis Tiliqua cepedi Eumeces mabouia Mabuia cepedii Mabuia alliacea Mabuia luciae Mabuia agilis Mabuia agilis var. luciae Mabuya mabouia Mabuia dominicana Mabuya deserticola Mabuya mabuya Mabuya pergravis

= Mabuya mabouya =

Species of lizard

Mabuya mabouya, the Greater Martinique skink, is a species of skink found on Martinique. It has shiny, bronze-colored skin, with a pair of light stripes that run along its upper flanks.

It was previously thought to be widespread throughout the Neotropics, but a taxonomic revision in 2005 established it as endemic to Martinique. With its new, restricted distribution, it is feared to be possibly extinct.
